= Athletics at the 2015 Palarong Pambansa =

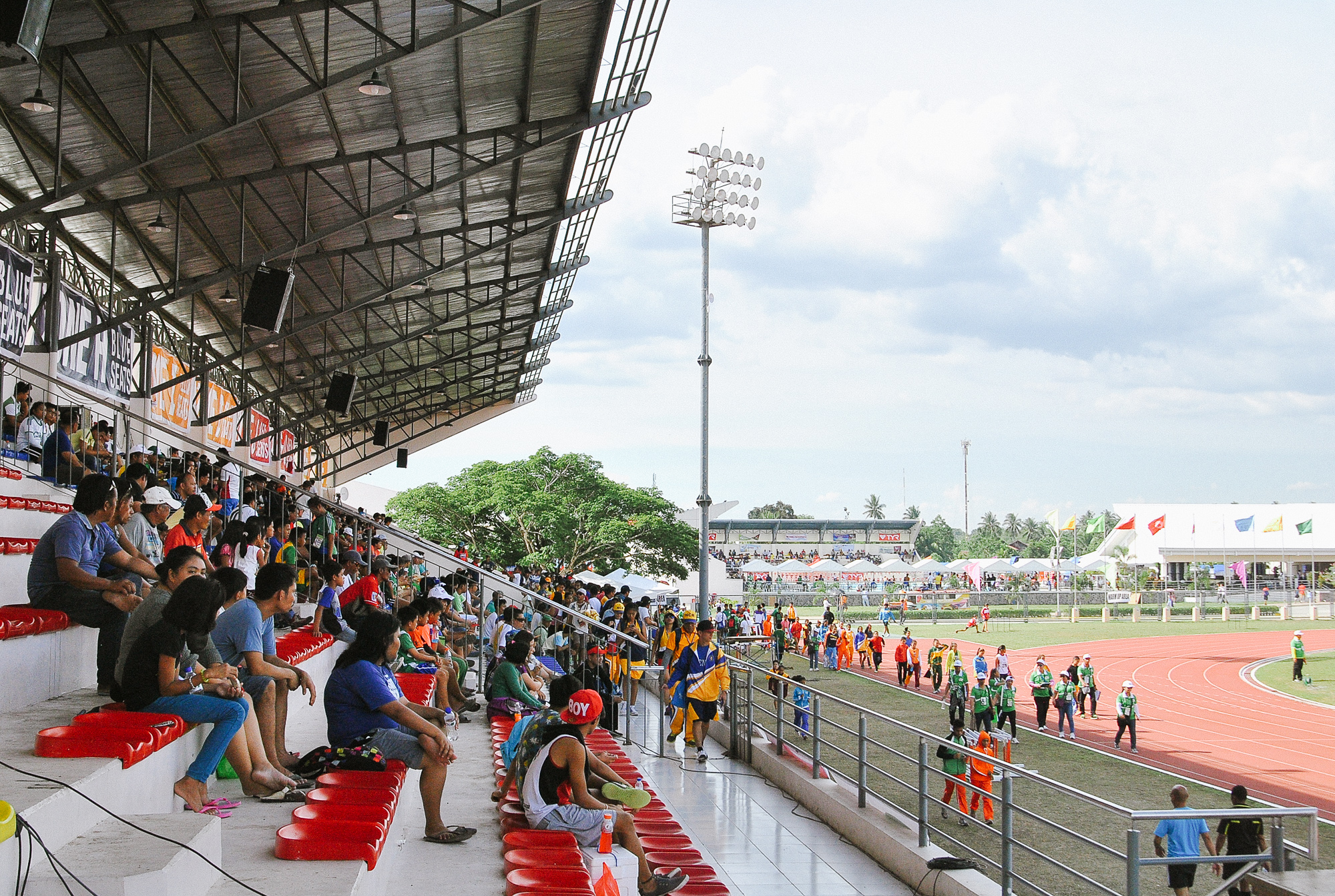
Davao del Norte Sports Complex the main venue of Athletics at the 2015 Palarong Pambansa

The athletics competitions at the 2015 Palarong Pambansa in Tagum were held at the Davao del Norte Sports Complex from 3–8 May 2015.

== Medal summary ==
(PR = Palarong Pambansa Record)

=== Highschool ===
==== Boys ====
Event	Gold		Silver		Bronze	
Javelin Throw	Joseph Vincent Patalud (NCRAA)	57.96	Ronald Lacson (WVRAA)	54.69	Mark Concrad Manipon (RIAA)	50.56
High Jump	Alexis Soqueño (WVRAA)	1.95 (PR)	Vince Jericho Velasco (CLRAA)	1.85 (2/2)	Fernando Jison Jr. (DAVRAA)	1.85 (2/6)
Discus Throw	John Christian Capasao (WVRAA)	40.60	John Edric Manalang (NCRAA)	38.77	Gideon Arellano (STCAA)	38.42
Triple Jump	Martin James Esteban (CLRAA)	15.01 (PR)	Kirk Cire Bacas (NMRAA)	14.26	John Marvin Rafols (CVIRAA)	14.23
1500 meters	Gilbert Rutaquiao (STCAA)	4:10.22	Rodnie Antiqueña (WVRAA)	4:10.38	Lloyd Prado (DAVRAA)	4:10.45
Pole Vault	Mark Matthew Operario (NCRAA)	3.6	Francis Edward Obiena (NCRAA)	3.6	Janple Bismonte (BRAA)	3.2
Long Jump	Jose Jerry Belibestre Jr. (WVRAA)	7.15	Martin James Esteban (CLRAA)	6.96	Cesar Fernandez (WVRAA)	6.75
Shot put - 6 kilograms	Kenneth Paul Rafanan (STCAA)	14.68	John Edric Manalang (NCRAA)	14.18	Tyrone Exequiel Flores (STCAA)	13.4
110 meter hurdles	Alvin John Vergel (NCRAA)	14.68	Alexis Soqueño (WVRAA)	14.74	Ludivico Dela Cruz Jr. (RIAA)	15.41
100 meter dash	Ivan Jeffrey Manjares (MRAA)	11.44	Ervin Carter (WVRAA)	11.46	Ezra Gonzales (STCAA)	11.55
400 meter run	John Kenneth Nodos (SRAA)	49.66	Russel Galleon (ZPRAA)	49.97	Jestony Magarzo (STCAA)	50.93
3000 meter steeple chase	Gilbert Rutaquiao (STCAA)	9:50.0	Mc Lord Cabalonga (ZPRAA)	9:58.2	Rodnie Antiqueña (WVRAA)	10:02.2
200 meter dash	Ivan Jeffrey Manjares (MRAA)	22.45	Rowil Christian Derecho (WVRAA)	22.59	John Kenneth Nodos (SRAA)	22.67
400 meter hurdles	Alexis Soqueño (WVRAA)	54.9	Marjun Sulleza (SRAA)	56.3	Rabbi Keith Gamay (NMRAA)	57.1
5000 meter run	Mc Lord Cabalonga (ZPRAA)	15:45.69	Earl Casinabe (NMRAA)	15:45.86	Lloyd Prado (DAVRAA)	15:55.29
4 × 100 meter relay	Western Visayas (WVRAA); Rogil Pablo; Rowil Christian Derecho; Alexis Soqueño; Ervin Carter	43.83	Calabarzon (STCAA); Angelito Felisilda; Joviane Calixto; Rick Martin Lilam; Ezra Gonzales	43.83	Northern Mindanao (NMRAA); Richard Roselim; Kirk Cire Bacas; Rabbi Keith Gamay; Elthon Ratilla	44.03
800 meter run	Maverick Christian Matchino (STCAA	1:56.98	Russel Galleon (ZPRAA)	1:57.01	Norman Asuncion (BRAA)	1:57.73
4 × 400 meter relay	Soccsksargen (SRAA); Kasi Feberoy; Marjun Sulleza; Charlie Dela Cruz Jr. John Kenneth Nodos	43.83	Northern Mindanao (NMRAA); Ronjon Redoble; Nico Japay; Rabbi Keith Gamay; Elthon Ratilla	43.83	Davao Region (DAVRAA); Peter Raul Malaran; Jestony Magarzo; Jerome Lintua; Lloyd Prado	44.03

==== Girls ====
Event	Gold		Silver		Bronze	
Javelin Throw	Efelyn Democer (NMRAA)	42.34 (PR)	Jovelyn Notario (CAVRAA)	40.91	Leanie Rose Asi (STCAA)	38.51
High Jump	Kay Lene Mosqueda (WVRAA)	1.6	Princess Danieli Desepeda (STCAA)	1.55	Sheila Mae Tacay (WVRAA)	1.55
High Jump	Kay Lene Mosqueda (WVRAA)	1.6	Princess Danieli Desepeda (STCAA)	1.55	Cherry Mae Banatao (CAVRAA)	1.55
3000 meter run	Jie Anne Calis (NMRAA)	10:10.16	Mea Gey Adialiaan Niñura (DAVRAA)	10:11.13	Joneza Mie Sustituedo (WVRAA)	10:56.07
Discus Throw	Daniella Daynata (NCRAA)	32.07	Kayla Bugatti (CARAA)	30.70	Precious Arteda (NCRAA)	30.41
Triple Jump	Gianell Gatinga (NCRAA)	11.79	Elvy Villagoniza (WVRAA)	11.79	Rosnani Pamaybay (NMRAA)	11.44
1500 meters	Jie Anne Calis (NMRAA)	4:42.20	Mea Gey Adialiaan Niñura (DAVRAA)	4:44.62	Anjelica De Josef (WVRAA)	4:50.13
Long Jump	Rosemarie Olorvida (EVRAA)	5.46	Elvy Villagoniza (WVRAA)	5.24	Marlyn Godoy (STCAA)	5.24
Shot put	Shanelle Demilys Siasoyco (CVIRAA)	10.35	Dianne Grace Zayco (WVRAA)	10.19	Daniella Daynata (NCRAA)	10.16
100 meter hurdles	Karen Janario (EVRAA)	15.24	Pamela Marquillero (WVRAA)	15.64	Ezel Divinagracia (WVRAA)	15.85
100 meter dash	Karen Janario (EVRAA)	12.75	Elrica Anne Guro (WVRAA)	12.99	Rosemarie Olorvida (EVRAA)	13.02
400 meter dash	Feiza Jane Lenton (EVRAA)	58.66	Anjelica De Josef (WVRAA)	58.71	Jessel Lumapas (STCAA)	59.69
200 meter dash	Karen Janario (EVRAA)	25.76	Elrica Anne Guro (WVRAA)	26.08	Briceline Soriano (RIAA)	26.47
400 meter hurdles	Ezel Divinagracia (WVRAA)	1:04.83	Ellah Therese Sirilan (NCRAA)	1:05.82	Bernalyn Bejoy (WVRAA)	1:06.05
4 × 100 meter relay	Western Visayas (WVRAA); Ezel Divinagracia; Elrica Anne Guro; Pamela Marquillero; Lejany Safraña	49.65	Eastern Visayas (EVRAA); Janario Karen; Feiza Jane Lenton; Rosemarie Olorvida; Gemmalyn Pino	49.67	National Capital Region (NCRAA); Celestina De Castro; Maria Lorenzana Esguerra; Gianell Gatinga; Ellah Therese Sirilan	49.92
800 meter run	Jie Anne Calis (NMRAA)	2:12.27	Feiza Jane Lenton (EVRAA)	2:14.47	Anjelica De Josef (WVRAA)	2:14.49
4 × 400 meter relay	Eastern Visayas (EVRAA); Janario Karen; Feiza Jane Lenton; Gemmalyn Pino; Lealyn Sanita	4:00.09 (PR)	Western Visayas (WVRAA); Bernalyn Bejoy; Anjelica De Josef; Ezel Divinagracia; Lejany Safraña	4:00.45 (PR)	National Capital Region (NCRAA); Mariso Amarga; Maria Lorenzana Esguerra; Caezalyn Cae Jupio; Ellah Therese Sirilan	4:01.81
