= Tagum National Trade School =

Public high school in Davao del Norte, Philippines

Location
- Apokon, Tagum City, Davao del Norte; Philippines
- 7°25′11″N 125°49′35″E

Information
- Type: Technical Vocational School (2007 STVEP, 1989 BTVE)
- Established: August 1972
- Principal: Roger E. Martinez, MITE
- Faculty: 109 (SY 2014-2015)
- Enrollment: 2,040 (SY 2014-2015)
- Campus: Urban, 35,000 square meters
- Color: Navy Blue
- Nickname: Trade School
- Website: Official website of Tagum National Trade School

Tagum National Trade School (TNTS) is the only vocational of the five main public high schools in Tagum City, under the jurisdiction of the DepEd Division of Tagum City and Technical Education and Skills Development Authority. It was founded on August 1, 1972. The institution cater students from Tagum City and the province of Davao del Norte.

Being a technical-vocational public high school, the school is noted for its various offerings in the field of Trade and Arts.

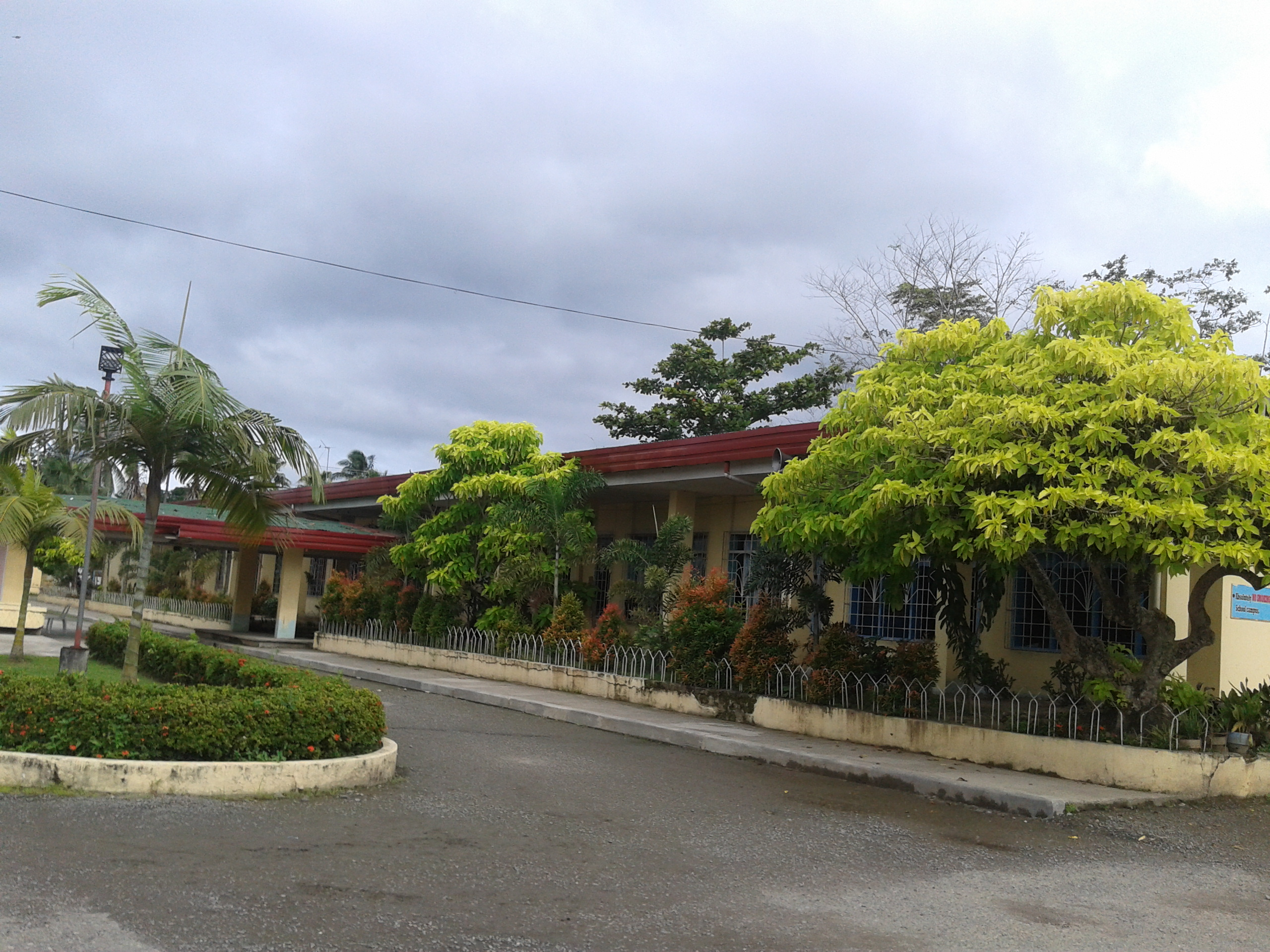
TNTS The Related Subject Department Building

== History ==
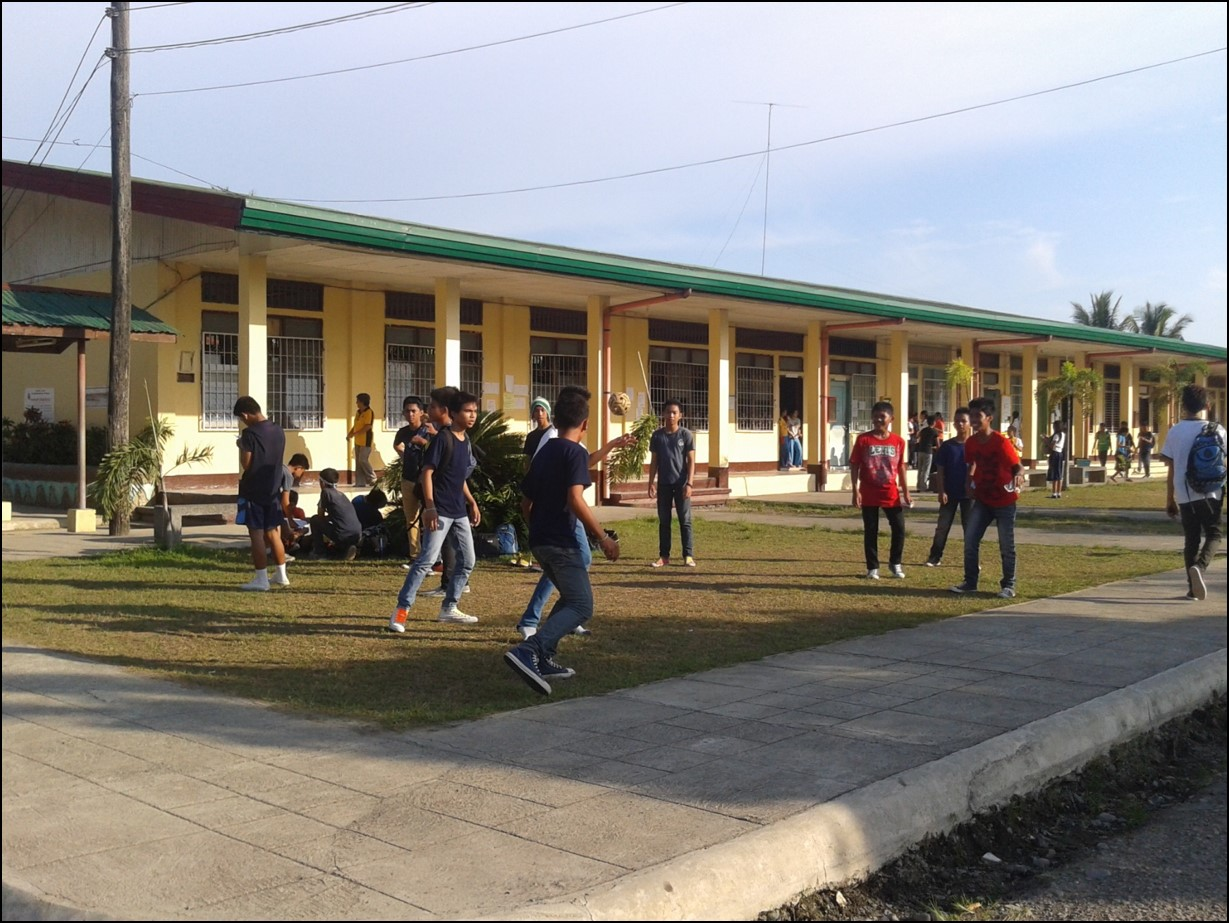
TNTS ground and the right side view of Tech-Voc Building

Tagum National Trade School began its emergence when Hon. Lorenzo P. Sarmiento, 1972 congressman of Davao del Norte framed a bill. He thought the need of the province particularly in the municipality of Tagum, now Tagum City, to have a vocational school to resolve the poor enrollment to formal education of the less fortunate group. In 1972, the bill to establish the school was passed as Republic Act (R.A.) 5986.

Tagum National Trade School began operating on August 1, 1972, with its temporary classroom the Tagum Community gym situated beside the Southern Philippines Medical Center, now Davao Regional Hospital, at Apokon, Tagum City. The seventy-eight (78) first year high school excess enrollees of Tagum Municipal High School and two teachers served as the pioneering batch.

As approved by DECS Order No. 28 as mandated by Batas Pambansa of 1975, the inaugural of the Post-Secondary Vocational Courses as the Two-Year Trade Technical Education curriculum started in 1976.

In 1989, the institution adopted the technical-vocational program under the Bureau of Technical-Vocational Education (BTVE). The school also was considered priority 1 in all vocational public schools based on the DECS Order 56, 59 and 62. Automotive Technology became the leading course followed by, electronics technology, electrical technology, civil technology, refrigeration and air-conditioning technology, etc. The secondary level eventually followed New Secondary Education Curriculum.

The implementation of R.A. 7796 in 1995, creating the Technical Education and Skills Development Authority (TESDA) prepared Tagum National Trade School as one of its superior Technical Vocational Training (TVI's) in Region XI. Teachers were sent to train at the National Training Center. Thus, technology courses were offered and more enrollees in college rolled in.

In 2007, the Department of Education (DepEd) implemented the “Strengthen Technical-Vocational Education Program (STVEP)” and Tagum National Trade School was identified one of tech-voc secondary public schools out of 282 across the country to implement the Competency-Based Curriculum and offered different areas of specialization in both Arts and Trade.

All through years, the school has gained admiration, pride and integrity from the constituent of Davao Region. Since 1996 the school became the first school offering computer literacy to its clients in the secondary level by including computer subjects in their curriculum.

== Curricula ==
In 1989, the school uses Bureau of Technical-Vocational Education (BTVE). While in 2007 the institution implemented Strengthen Technical-Vocational Education Program (STVEP) and RBEC Curriculum, STVEP uses performance-based grading system and RBEC uses zero-based grading system, both are used for each grading period.

=== Old STVEP Curriculum ===
In school year (SY) 2007–2008, the Department of Education (DepEd) has implemented the “Strengthened Technical-Vocational Education Program (STVEP). The said curriculum was launched to strengthen the technical-vocation education (TVE) in public secondary schools. It envisions to promote and support the interest of skilled learners at young age.

According to the Secretary of Education Armin Luistro, the implementation of STVEP was initiated by the Tech-Voc Task Force (TVTF) in connection with the aims of Education For All (EFA) global movement. This has also been a dream of Philippines Millennium Development Goals (PMDG), the Medium Term Philippine Development Plan (MTPDP), and the 10-point agenda of the Philippine Government. The curriculum is currently on for modification for the needed adjustments in the K–12 Program.

The table below lists the subjects taken by the STVEP students.

Subjects	First Year	Second Year	Third Year	Fourth Year
Science	General Science	Biology	Chemistry	Advanced Physics
Mathematics	Elementary Algebra	Geometry	Advanced Algebra	Trigonometry, Precalculus & Calculus
English	Grammar and Philippine Literature	Grammar and Afro-Asian Literature	Grammar and American Literature	Grammar and World Literature
Filipino	Pag-unawa	Gramatika	Panitikang Pilipino	Panitikang Asyano
Social Studies (AP)	Philippine History and Government	Asian History	World History	Economics
Music, Arts, Physical Education & Health (MAPEH)	Music, Arts, Physical Education & Health I	Music, Arts, Physical Education & Health II	Music, Arts, Physical Education & Health III	Music, Arts, Physical Education & Health IV
Values (EP)	Values Education (Sarili)	Values Education (Kapwa)	Values Education (Lipunan)	Values Education (Diyos)
Technical Vocational Majors	Exploration Stage: Cosmetics Technology; Garments Trade; Foods Trade; Electronics Technology; Electrical Technology; Refrigeration and Air-conditioning Technology; Wood Working; Building Construction; Computer Graphics and Animation; Computer Hardware Servicing; Computer Networking; Automotive Technology; Trade Drawing I	Garments Trade; Foods Trade; Electronics Technology; Electrical Technology; Refrigeration and Air-conditioning Technology; Wood Working; Building Construction; Computer Graphics and Animation; Computer Hardware Servicing; Computer Networking; Automotive Technology; Technical Drafting; Trade Drawing II	Garments Trade; Foods Trade; Consumers Electronics; Electrical Installation and Maintenance Technology; Refrigeration and Air-conditioning Technology; Building Construction; Computer Graphics and Animation; Computer Hardware Servicing; Computer Networking; Automotive Technology; Technical Drafting	Garments Trade; Foods Trade; Consumers Electronics; Electrical Installation and Maintenance Technology; Refrigeration and Air-conditioning Technology; Building Construction; Computer Graphics and Animation; Computer Hardware Servicing; Computer Networking; Automotive Technology; Technical Drafting

=== RBEC and K–12 Program Curriculum ===
The following are the subjects to be taken by Grades 7 to Grade 10 under K–12 Program this school year 2015-2016

=== Junior high school ===
Subjects	Grade 7	Grade 8	Grade 9	Grade 10
Science	Chemistry; Biology; Physics; Earth Science	Physics; Earth Science; Chemistry; Biology	Biology; Chemistry; Earth Science; Physics	Earth Science; Physics; Biology; Chemistry
Mathematics	Elementary Algebra	Geometry	Advanced Algebra	Trigonometry, Precalculus & Calculus
English	Grammar and Philippine Literature	Grammar and Afro-Asian Literature	Grammar and American Literature	Grammar and World Literature
Filipino	Pag-unawa	Gramatika	Panitikang Pilipino	Panitikang Asyano
Social Studies (AP)	Philippine History and Government	Asian History	World History	Economics
Music, Arts, Physical Education & Health (MAPEH)	Music, Arts, Physical Education & Health 7	Music, Arts, Physical Education & Health 8	Music, Arts, Physical Education & Health 9	Music, Arts, Physical Education & Health 10
Values (EP)	Values Education (Sarili)	Values Education (Kapwa)	Values Education (Lipunan)	Values Education (Diyos)
Technical Vocational Majors	Exploration Stage: Cosmetics Technology; Garments Trade; Foods Trade; Electronics Technology; Electrical Technology; Refrigeration and Air-conditioning Technology; Wood Working; Building Construction; Computer Graphics and Animation; Computer Hardware Servicing; Computer Networking; Automotive Technology; Trade Drawing I	Garments Trade; Foods Trade; Electronics Technology; Electrical Technology; Refrigeration and Air-conditioning Technology; Wood Working; Building Construction; Computer Graphics and Animation; Computer Hardware Servicing; Computer Networking; Automotive Technology; Technical Drafting; Trade Drawing II	Garments Trade; Foods Trade; Consumers Electronics; Electrical Installation and Maintenance Technology; Refrigeration and Air-conditioning Technology; Building Construction; Computer Graphics and Animation; Computer Hardware Servicing; Computer Networking; Automotive Technology; Technical Drafting	Garments Trade; Foods Trade; Consumers Electronics; Electrical Installation and Maintenance Technology; Refrigeration and Air-conditioning Technology; Building Construction; Computer Graphics and Animation; Computer Hardware Servicing; Computer Networking; Automotive Technology; Technical Drafting

=== Senior High School Modelling Program ===
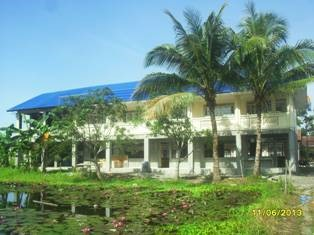
Senior High School Building as part of K–12 Modelling Program

Under the DepEd Order No. 62, s. 2012, Tagum National Trade School was chosen among the schools in the Philippines to operate and start Senior High School (SHS) Modelling Program under the K to 12 Basic Education Program. The schools were provided with technical assistance as means of support. The institution will be offering Industrial and Arts under Technical-Vocational-Livelihood Track, instead of offering Academic Tracts or Arts and Sports Track. On School Year (SY) 2012–2013, thirty-nine (39) fourth year graduate students enrolled and become part of the K–12 Modeling Program. March 2014, all of these students made a significant history, as the first Senior High School graduate of Region XI.

Senior High School Modelling Program were also offered in the selected provinces throughout the Philippines. Here are some of the schools that planned and started the SHS Modelling Program Assumption Antipolo, Ateneo de Naga University, Claret School of Quezon City, Colegio San Agustin Makati, Immaculate Conception Academy, Manila Central University, MGC New Life Christian Academy, Miriam College High School, Our Lady of Fatima University, Philippine Women's University, San Pedro Relocation Center National High School, St. Jude Catholic School, St. Paul College Pasig, Tagum City National Trade School, University of Makati, Xavier School, and schools belonging to the National Network of Normal Schools (3NS).

	Grade 11		Grade 12
Subject	First Semester	Second Semester	First Semester	Second Semester
English	English 1: Study and Thinking Skills	English 2: Writing in the Discipline
Filipino	Filipino 1: Komunikasyon sa Akademikong Filipino	Filipino 2: Pagbasa at Pagsulat Tungo saPananaliksik
Math	Math 1: College Algebra	Math 2: Plane and Spherical Trigonometry
Science	Science 1: General Chemistry	Science 2: General Biology
Social Science	Soc Sci 1: General Psychology	Soc Sci 2: Society and Culture with Family Planning	Soc Sci 3: Basic Economics (with Taxation and Agrarian Reform); Soc Sci 4: Life and Works of Rizal; Soc Sci 5: Philippine History
P.E.	P.E. 1: Physical Fitness Activities	P.E. 2: Fundamental Rhythmic Activities and Dances
Entrep			Entrepreneurship
Computer		Introduction to Information Technology
T.V.E.	Consumer Electronics; Foods Trade; Automotive Technology; Technical Drafting	Consumer Electronics; Foods Trade; Automotive Technology; Technical Drafting	Consumer Electronics; Foods Trade; Automotive Technology; Technical Drafting	On the Job Training

=== Senior High School Early Implementation ===
After the school has offered two batches of SHS Modelling Program, (SY 2012–2013) and (SY 2013–2014) two (2) more batches were produced but this time it is the Senior High School (SHS) Early Implementation. School Year (SY 2014–2015) has produced forty-six (46) while (SY 2014–2015) has twenty six (26) students respectively.

=== Senior High School Full Blast Implementation ===
The School has again made another history for having the most number of enrolees among public schools in Tagum City Division with over nine-hundred students from all over the region both coming from public and private schools.

== TESDA Assessment Center ==
At present Tagum National Trade School is an accredited Assessment Center of the following programs:

- Automotive Servicing NC I
- Automotive Servicing NC II
- Bookkeeping NC III
- Carpentry NC II
- Cookery NC II
- Computer Hardware Servicing NC II
- Consumer Electronics Servicing NC II
- Dressmaking NC II
- Electrical Installation & Maintenance NC II
- Food & Beverage Services NC II
- Food Processing NC II
- Housekeeping NC II
- Masonry NC II
- Plumbing NC II
- RAC (PACU/CRE) Servicing NC II
- RAC Servicing (Window-type AC/Domestic Ref) NC I
- Slaughtering Operations NC II
- Technical Drafting NC II
- Tile Setting NC II

== Facility ==
=== Food Technology Building ===
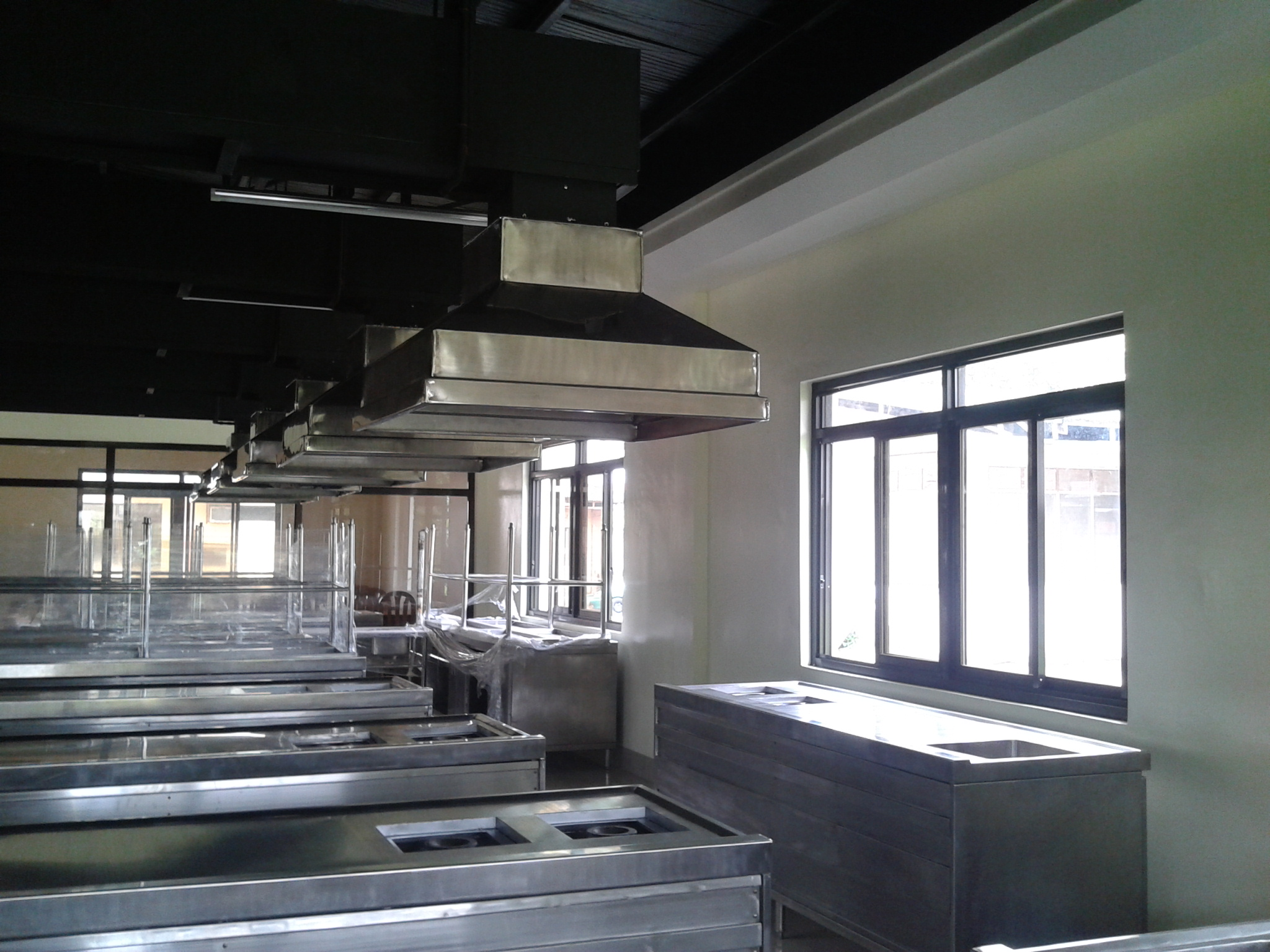
Cookery NC II

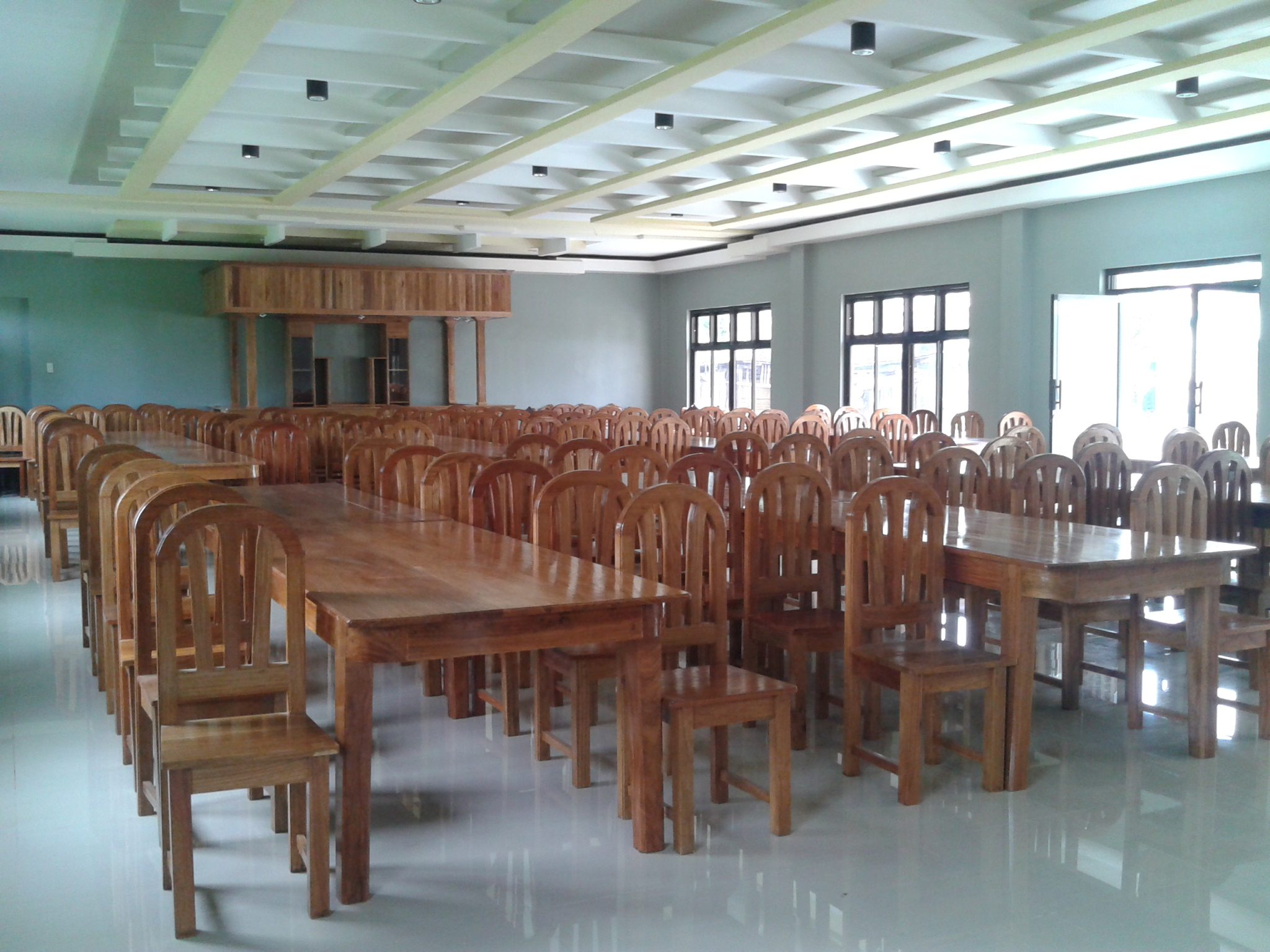
Food and Beverage Services NC II

The Department of Education and the Tagum City Government prepares for a strengthened technical-vocational education under the K–12 senior high school program. A food technology building will soon accommodate students of Tagum National Trade School.

On November 7, 2013, local officials led by Hon. Allan L. Rellon, Tagum City Mayor joined by Dr. Milagros Valles, the Tech-voc chair of the Department of Education's Bureau of Secondary Education based in Manila and DepEd personalities had a ground-breaking ceremony for the said construction.

The first phase of the SOTA food technology building was financed by DepEd Central Office worth 4, 544, 771.51 pesos. While the second phase, worth 4 million pesos was assured by the local government of Tagum City. Additional budget was allocated by the DepEd for the procurement of facility worth 2.5 million. The said infrastructure began its operation last October 20, 2014

== Student publications ==
The school's official publications are The Tradean Blue and Ang Manlilikha

== Gallery ==
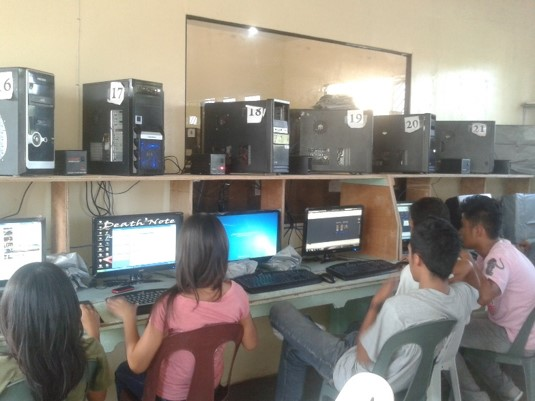
The Technical Drafting NC II

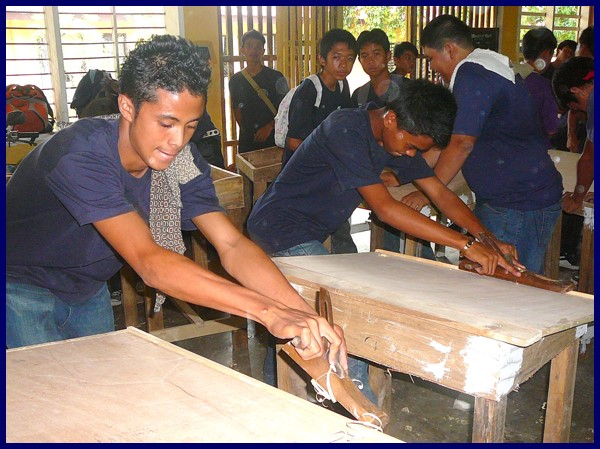
Civil Technology NC II

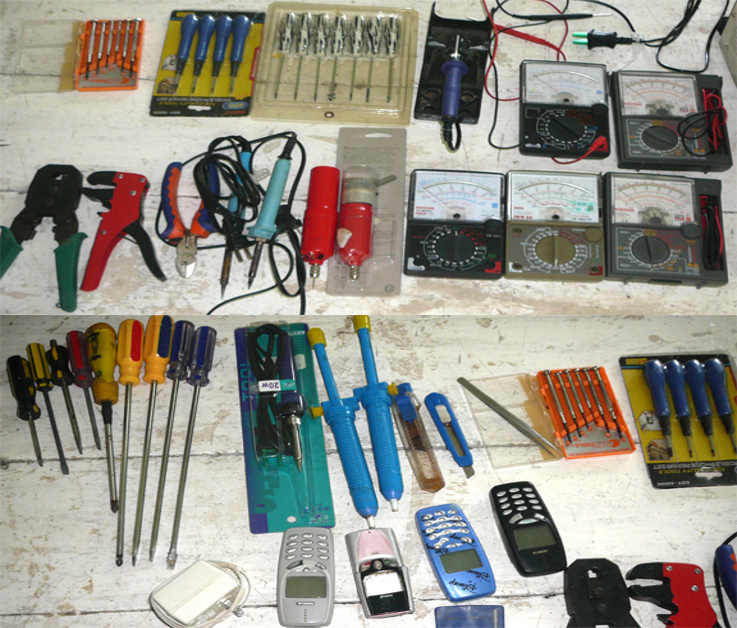
Tools of Electrical Installation and Maintenance Technology

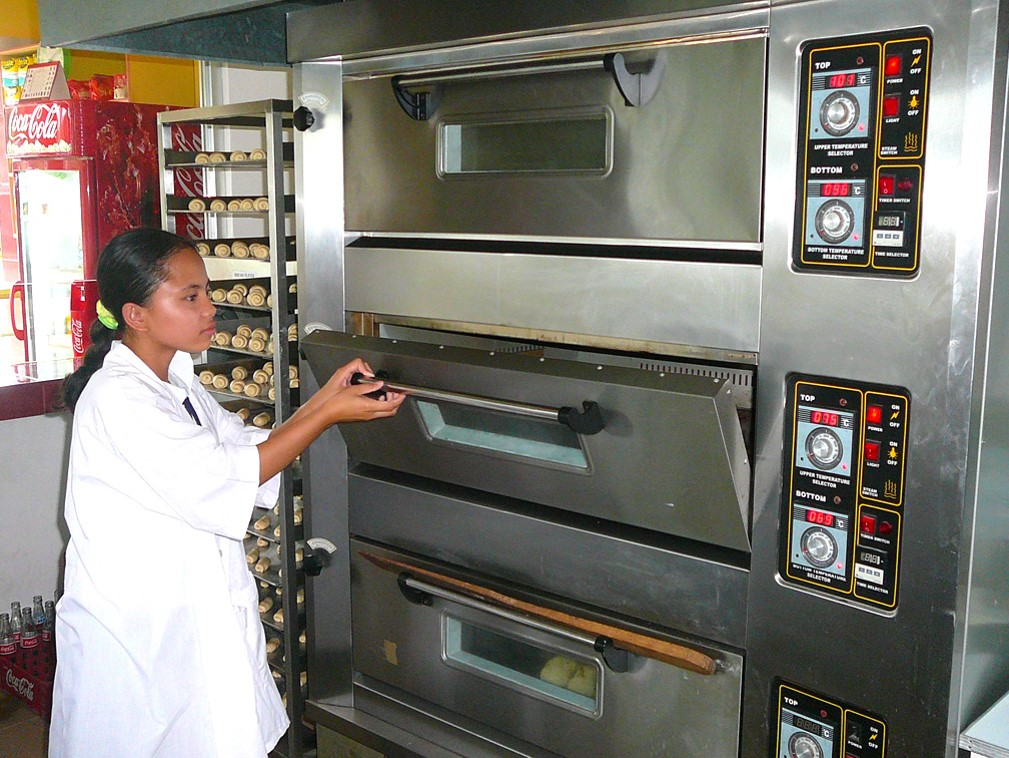
Bread and Pastries NC II

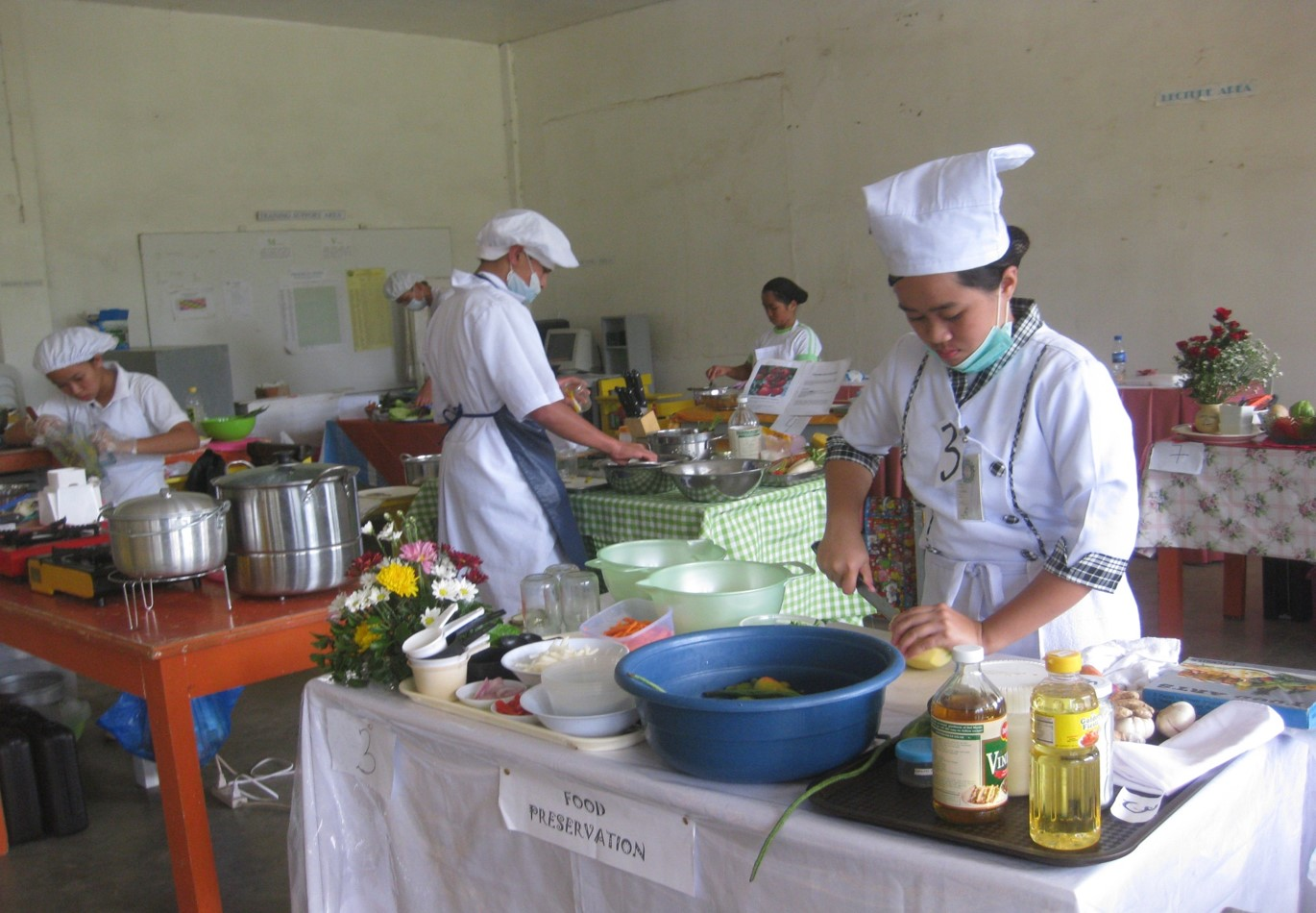
Cookery NC II

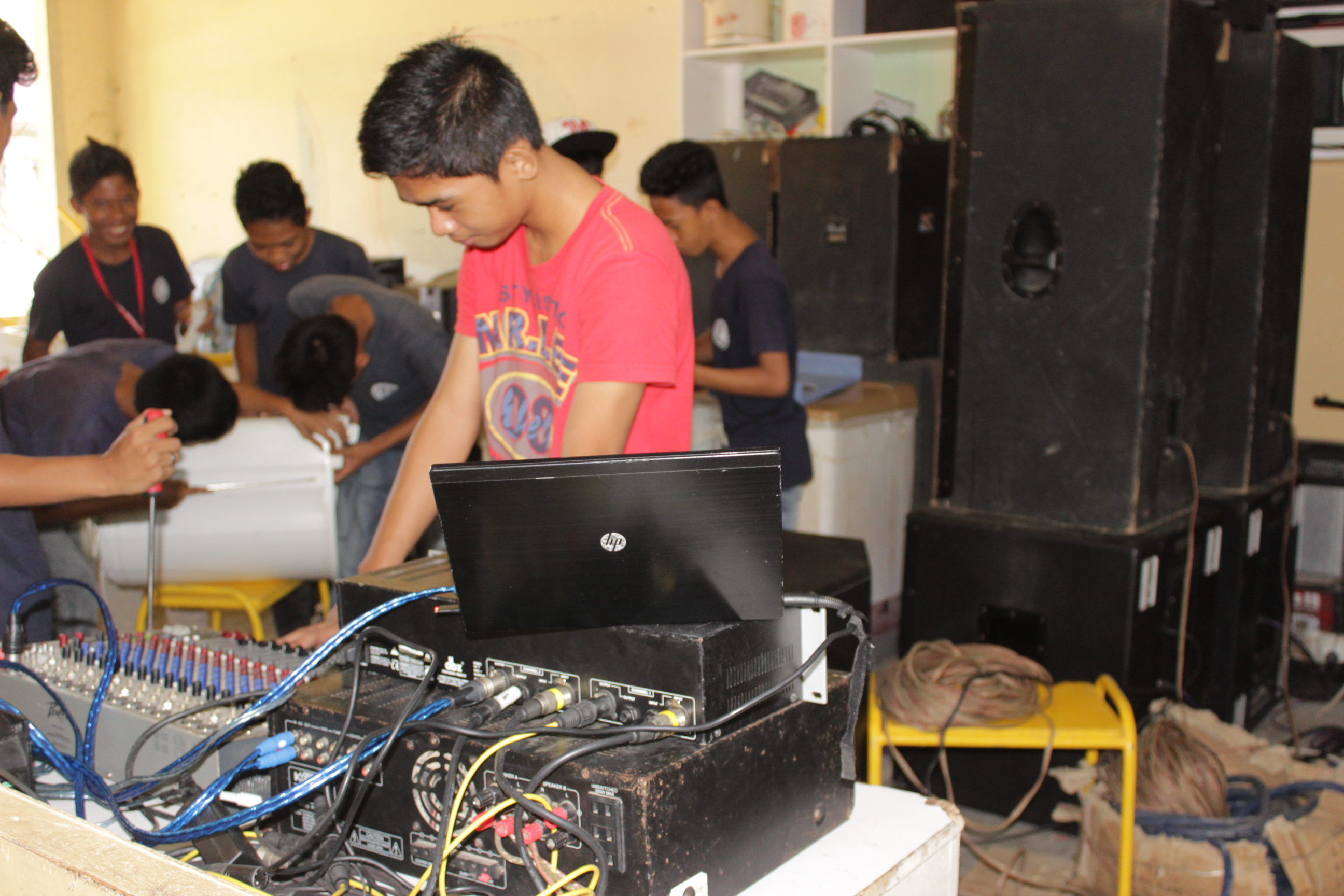
Consumer Electronics NC II

== See also ==
- Tagum City
- Davao del Norte
- Department of Education (Philippines)
- Technical Education and Skills Development Authority
