= Tagum City National High School =

Public high school in Davao del Norte, Philippines

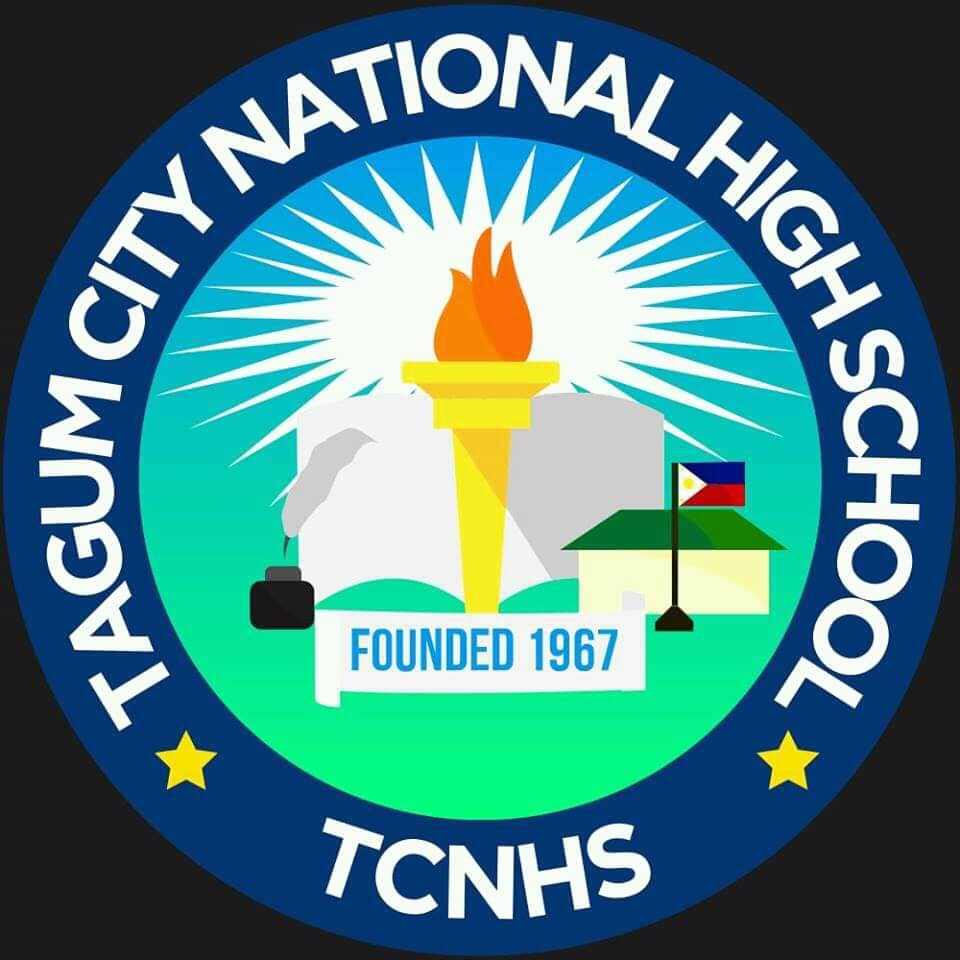

Location
- Mangga, Visayan Village, Tagum City, Davao del Norte; Philippines; 7°26′13″N 125°48′44″E

Information
- Type: Public high school
- Established: February 14, 1967 (by Barrio Charter)
- Principal: Dionisio B.Siglos, PhD (School Principal IV)
- Faculty: 238 (SY 2024-2025)
- Grades: 7 to 12
- Enrollment: 7000+ (SY 2020 - 2021)
- Campus: Urban, 20,003 square meters
- Colors: Blue and white
- Nickname: City High, Mangga
- Website: tagumcitynhs.ph

Tagum City National High School (TCNHS), formerly known as Tagum Community High School, is a public high school in Tagum, Davao del Norte, Philippines. It was founded on February 14, 1967 to cater to students from Tagum City and the province of Davao del Norte.

== History ==
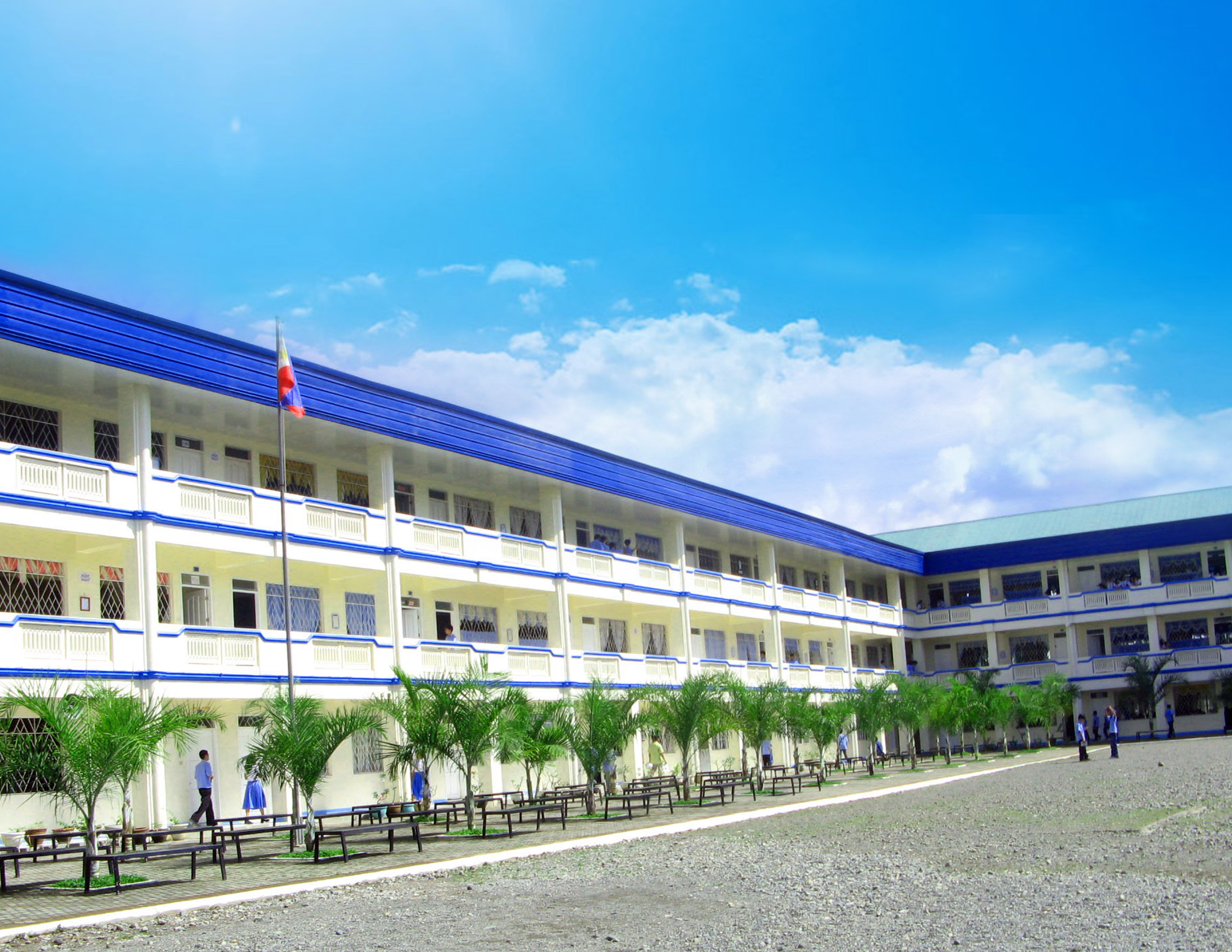
TCNHS new building (LGU building)

Tagum Community High School was founded in June 1967, enrolling 68 first-year and 54 second-year students. The first graduation ceremony took place in March 1970.

The conversion of Tagum Community High School into Tagum Municipal High School was accomplished through a resolution, which was accepted by the Municipal Council on February 14, 1972. The increasing student population led to the construction of classrooms at the old Municipal Gym, presently known as Freedom Park.

In the 1976-1977 school year, A 20,003 square meter lot was donated and Tagum Municipal High School relocated to its present location on October 4, 1982.

On February 14, 2006, on its 39th anniversary Tagum National High School was converted into Tagum City National High School, becoming a secondary education institution in the province of Davao del Norte.

== Curricula ==
The school uses two curricula, the RBEC Curriculum (for RBEC students) and the SPSTEM (Special Program for Science, Technology, Engineering, and Math) Curriculum, both using the zero-based grading system for each period. In June 2010, the school shifted academic focus to the newly implemented 2010 Secondary Education Curriculum (2010 SEC), to be implemented in SY 2011–2012.

== Student organizations ==
The student body is governed by the Supreme Student Government (SSG), with elected officials administering on a student-level system; elections are annually held before the current school year ends. The SSG is under the supervision of the school administration through an appointed SSG adviser.

Tagum City National High School has many clubs in support of its curriculum program, most notably the TCNHS Dance Theater Guild (DTG), Philippine Society of Youth Science Clubs in the Philippines (PSYSC-YISC), Visual Arts Guild (VAG), TCNHS Conexus Harmonia Chorale, TCNHS Rondalla, Press Corps, and the Boy Scouts of the Philippines and Girl Scouts of the Philippines – TCNHS Chapter.
