= Seal of Tagum =

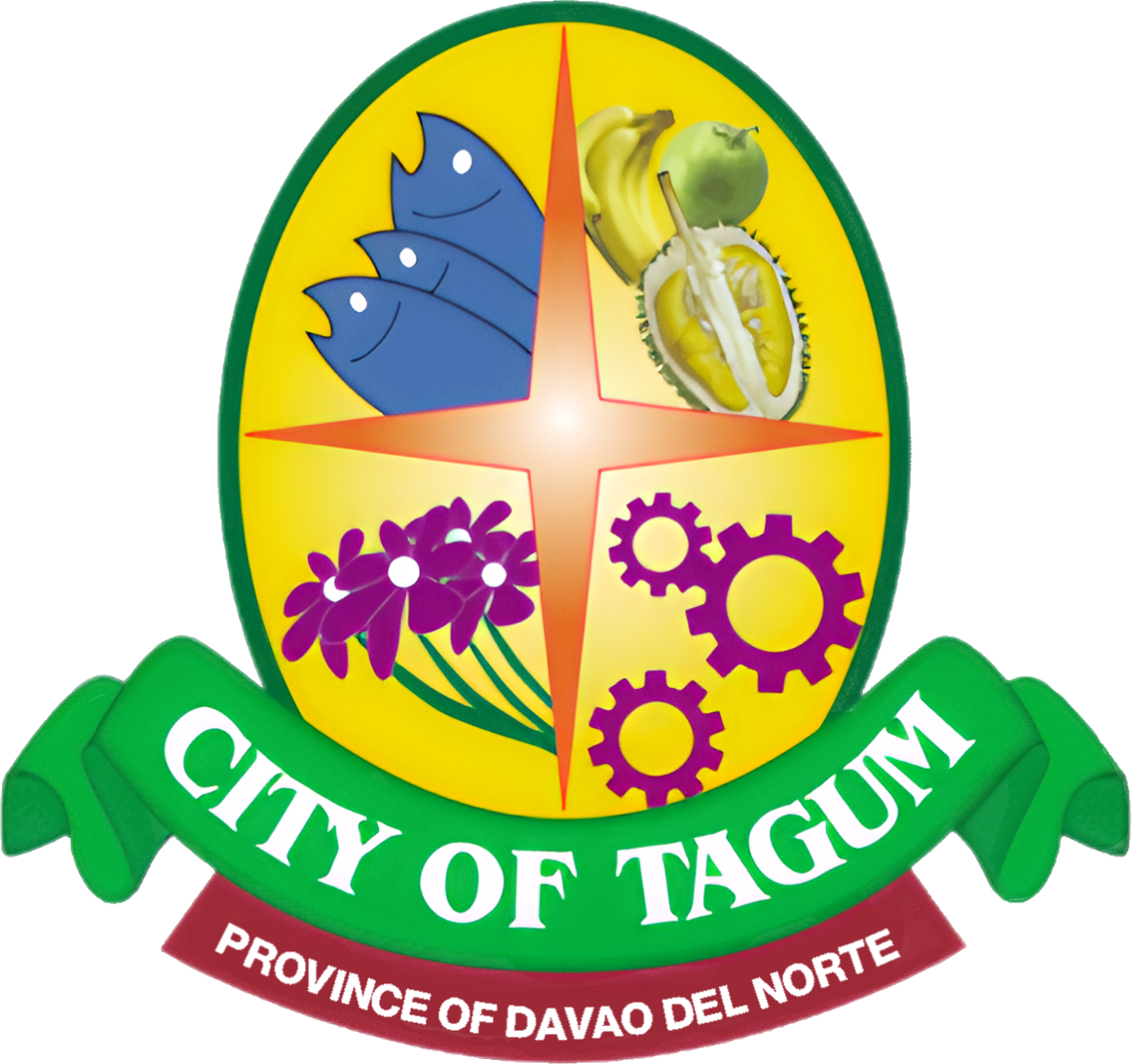
- Armiger: Tagum
- Shield: Or, A four-pointed mullet Tenné; on the dexter, upper portion of the mullet, fishes proper, on the lower portion flowers purpure; on the sinister, upper portion of the mullet, a durian, bunch of bananas and young coconut proper, on the lower portion gears purpure.
- Compartment: Beneath shall be the scroll vert with the inscription "CITY OF TAGUM" and beneath the scroll the inscription "PROVINCE OF DAVAO DEL NORTE" in a band tenné.
- Motto: City of Tagum

The Seal of Tagum is one of the official symbols of the city of Tagum.

== Historical seals ==
(1980s–1998) Municipality of Tagum Seal we're most likely used in the late 1980s. Tagum Seal does have a pointed mullet before Cityhood of Tagum changed its new seal in 1998.

(1998–2010) Most likely one of the first and earliest Tagum City seal designs ever, this variant seal was used until the Internet-era redesign to the same symbol which is now the current Tagum City Seal. The closest evidence is where Members of the Tagum City Band's T-shirt with a familiar of this seal with Councilor Idol Boyet, ca. 2000 to 2007.

Before Tagum converted into a City in 1998, the Municipality of Tagum has its own seal described as Plain and simple Outline Yellow Circle. On under of its design of its Old Tagum seal, it utilized a white shield with a 19-pointed triangle or mullet yellow which is very familiar to the 19 barangays of Tagum before Barangay Magugpo separated four new Barangays in 1995 when it became 23 barangays of Tagum. a Shield with the background on the Shield was a red and green color scheme with a central white architectural or structural element.

The Former Old Municipality Seal of Tagum was thought to be lost. But the reality was obscure. On March, 31, 2025. The Facebook user Old Tagum in Photographs posted about Tang Catañares' Mom (Maria C. Pono) sharing the old municipal hall with old colleagues. On the other hand, in the background of its old municipal hall of Tagum the Municipal Seal of Tagum was also discovered and believed to be lost and obscure. On March, 7, 1998, the Municipality of Tagum converted into a city. Tagum City has changed its seal and not the outline yellow circle.

== Description ==
The seal has the following description and symbolisms:

1. The seal is described to be of a classic "crest and ribbon" style which is used to convey nobility and tradition. The crest or circular shield is of gold color which symbolizes the "golden image" of the city, the gold, precious metal and jewelry trade, which is one of the primary industries of the city as a trading center. It also symbolizes the rich ethnic and cultural heritage of the city's inhabitants.
2. The crest is emblazoned with symbols representing the aquaculture and agriculture of the city, including the flower cutting industry. The agriculture industry of the city is represented by historical and present high-value crops of the city —- the durian, banana, and coconut.
3. The interlocking gears symbolize the modernization of the city — the development of the city's infrastructure and trade and commercial industry.
4. The agriculture and aquaculture symbols and the gears, are separated by brown lines, which resemble points of a compass. It symbolizes the city's "dynamism in developing many different industries"
5. Below the crest are ribbons in green and brown bearing the inscriptions "CITY OF TAGUM on the green ribbon, PROVINCE OF DAVAO DEL NORTE” on the brown ribbon. These seek to proclaim the city's pride in its inhabitants and its rich land, which yields high-value produce and precious metals.
