= Allan L. Rellon =

Allan Rellon
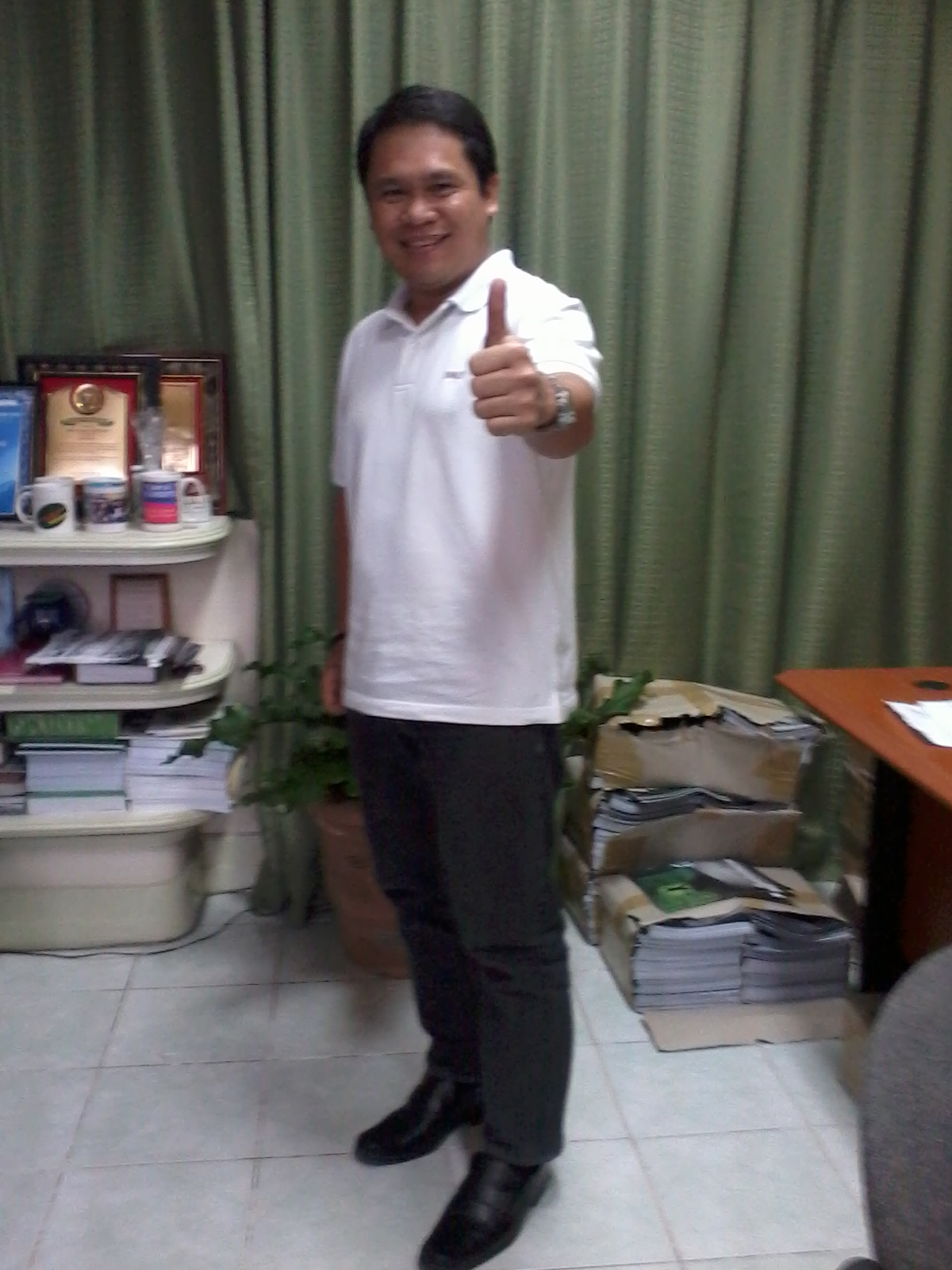
- Rellon in 2012

Vice Mayor of Tagum
- In office June 30, 2022 – June 30, 2025
- Succeeded by: Eva Lorraine Estabillo
- In office June 30, 2004 – June 30, 2013
- Succeeded by: Geterito T. Gementiza

Mayor of Tagum
- In office June 30, 2013 – June 30, 2022
- Preceded by: Rey T. Uy
- Succeeded by: Rey T. Uy

Member of the Tagum City Council
- In office June 30, 1998 – June 30, 2004

Personal details
- Born: May 5, 1969 (age 57) Samal, Davao del Norte, Philippines
- Party: Liberal (2009–2012); PDP–Laban (2012–2021); Reporma (2021–present)
- Education: Southwestern University (B.S., M.P.A. Ph.D.); University of Mindanao (M.A.)
- Profession: Teacher, politician

Allan Lopez Rellon (born May 5, 1969) is a Filipino teacher and politician who served as the vice mayor of Tagum from 2022 to 2025. He previously served as the mayor of Tagum from 2013 to 2022. And previously served as vice mayor of Tagum from 2004 to 2013. He was also the Secretary-General of the Vice Mayor's League of the Philippines. Rellon was named the Best Reserve Officer of the Philippine Army Reserve Command in 2009 and is currently on the board of directors of the University of Mindanao Tagum College.

== Scouting life ==
During his younger years, Rellon was an active boy scout and was awarded the rank of Eagle Scout (Boy Scouts of the Philippines), the highest rank awarded to a Senior Scout in the Boy Scouts of the Philippines (BSP) and a member of the Eagle Scout Association of the Philippines. Currently, he is the 1st Vice-Council Chairman of the BSP Tagum City Associate Council and the Regional Scout Commissioner of the BSP Eastern Mindanao Region. He is a Wood Badge graduate and currently a 4 beads holder and Leader Trainer. He is also a member of the Association of Top Achiever Scouts of Asia Pacific Region (Asia-Pacific Scout Region), now known as ATAS World, which is a member (BP Fellow) of the World Scout Foundation.

== Public life ==
His parents are Mr. Nicanor Tampipi Rellon, a retired Tagum Municipal agriculturist and Mrs. Lucia Antalan Lopez-Rellon, a retired master teacher. He has a Bachelor of Science in education (magna cum laude), Master of Arts in education (Academic), Master in Public Administration with a major in Government Administration, and Doctor of Philosophy in Development Studies (Academic). He finished his Doctor of Public Administration (DPA) at Southwestern University (Philippines) in Cebu City. His career has progressed from a humble beginning as a sales boy to utility worker, teacher and college administrator. Rellon entered government service in 1993 where he became the Administrator of Tagum. He is known for his good and dynamic leadership as an Administrator thus Tagum people supported him when he sought for public office as City Councilor in 1998.

== Political life ==
For six years as a city councilor, Rellon introduced ordinances and resolutions for the city. Including the implementation and expansion of the "Education For All" program like the Sulong-Dunong, City Educational Scholarship Program-now known as CIVOTESPRO Special Program for Employment of Students (SPES) Day Care Program, NFE, Cultural Communities for Muslims and Lumad peoples, Skills Trainings, A&E-Balik Paaralan para sa Out of School Adults. Rellon undertook international studies, training and exposures on governance and leadership in other countries including Germany, Japan, China, Thailand, Singapore and Switzerland. He has been a resource speaker in governance, and provided teaching, lectures and workshops on leadership, parliamentary procedure, team building and legislative processes to the youth and adult leaders of the city.

== See also ==
- Isko Moreno

Preceded by Gerardo R. Racho, Jr.	Tagum; 2005–present	Succeeded by Incumbent
