= Tagum =

Capital city of Davao del Norte, Philippines

- Component city
- City of Tagum
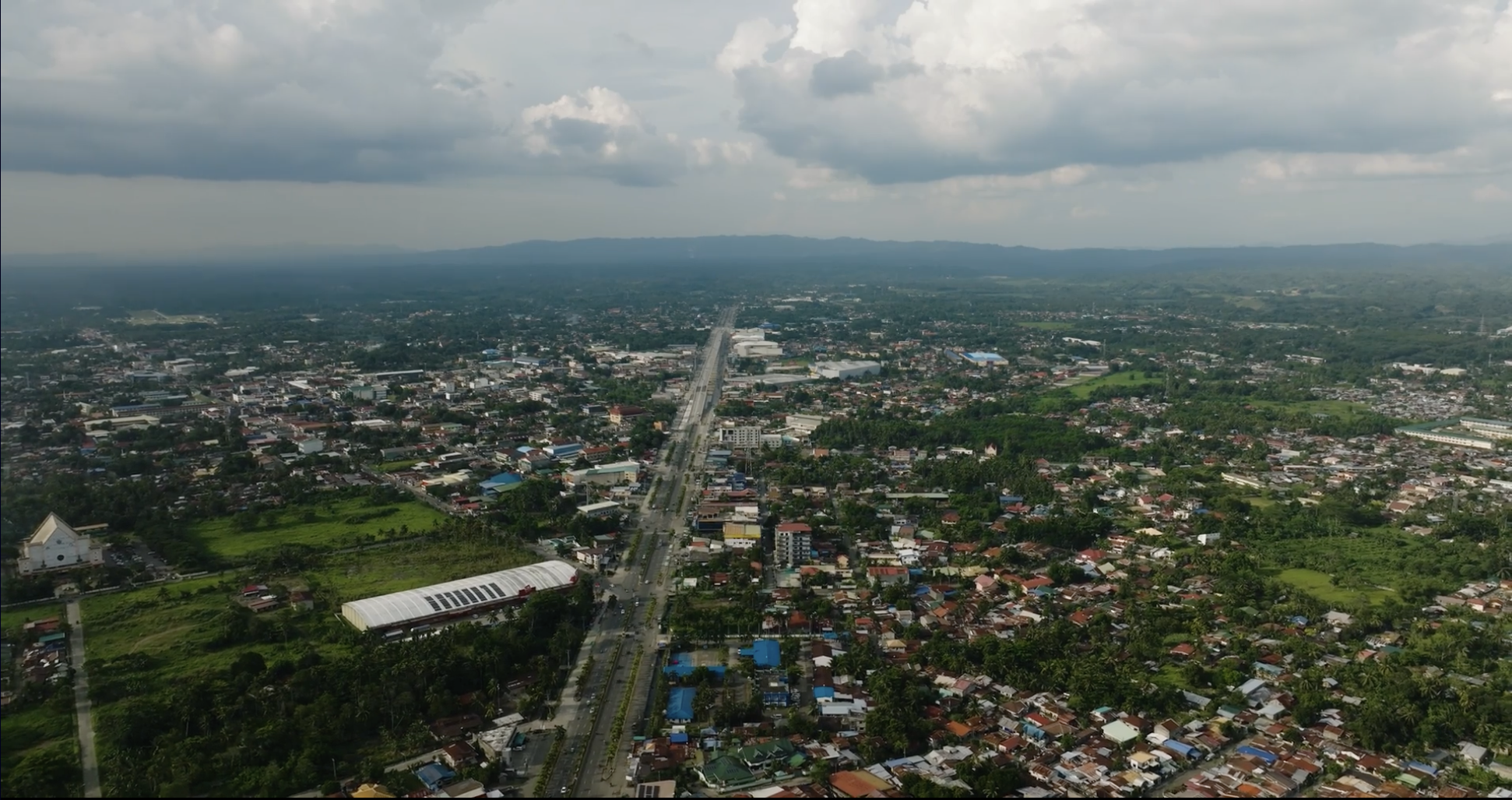
- Aerial view

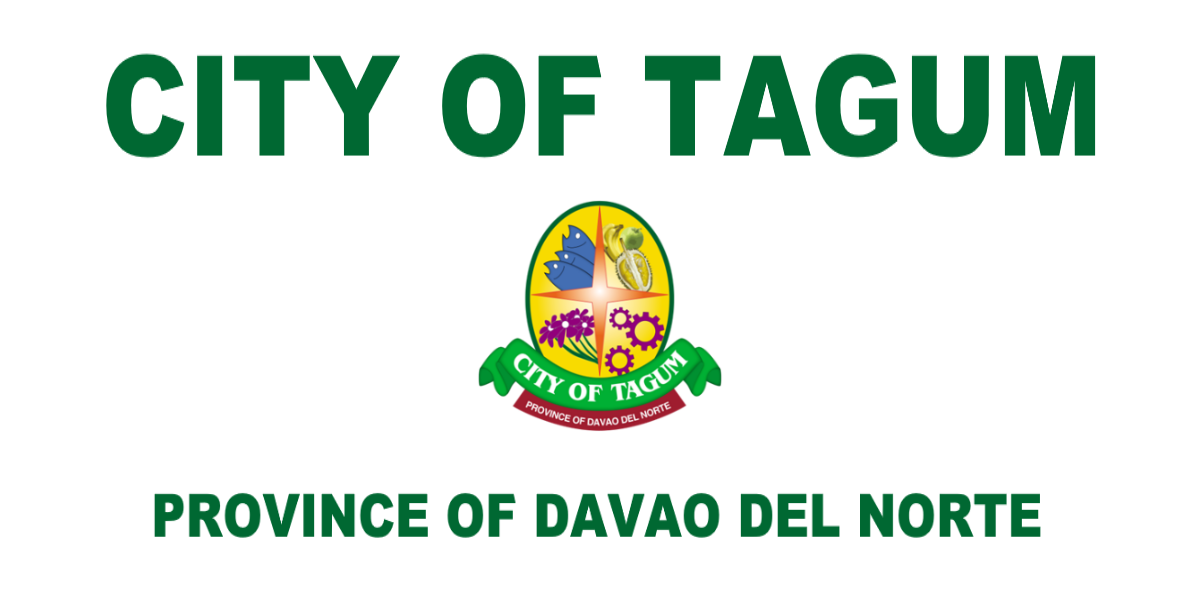
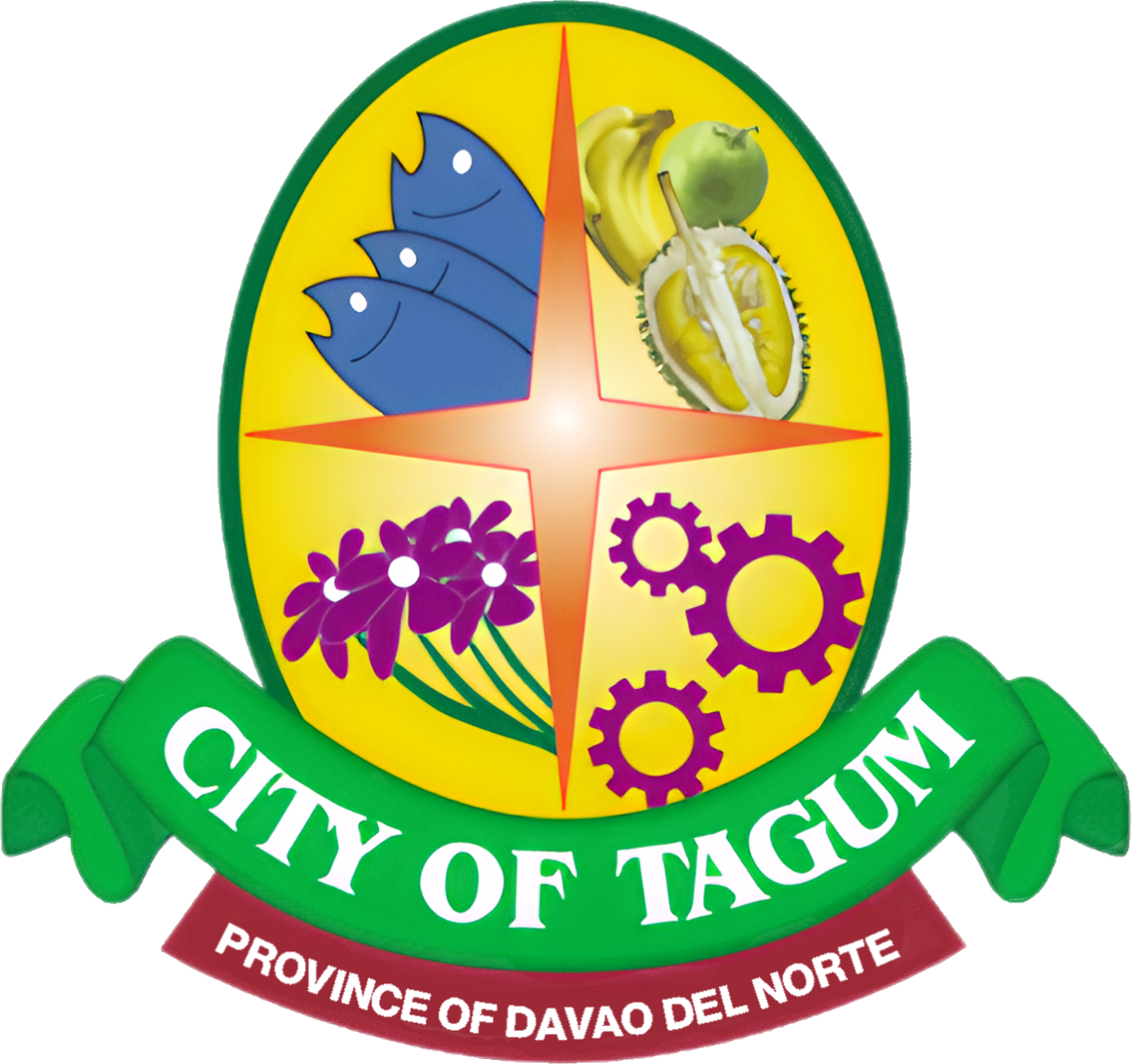
- Flag Seal
- Etymology: Cebuano: Tagum (indigo)
- Nicknames: Palm City of the Philippines; City of Festivals; Music Capital of the South; Marching Show Band Capital of the Philippines; City of Golden Opportunities; City of Perfect Harmony; City of Harmony
- Anthem: Tagum, Mabuhay Ka! (Long May You Live, Tagum!)
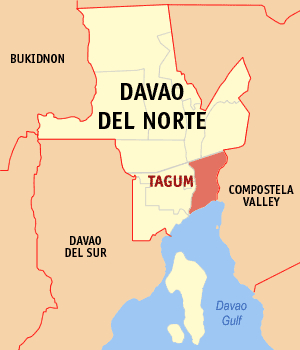
- Map of Davao del Norte with Tagum highlighted
- Interactive map of Tagum
- Location within the Philippines
- Coordinates: 7°26′52″N 125°48′28″E
- Country: Philippines
- Region: Davao Region
- Province: Davao del Norte
- District: 1st district
- Founded: June 23, 1941
- Cityhood: March 7, 1998
- Barangays: 23 (see Barangays)

Government
  - Type: Sangguniang Panlungsod
  - Mayor: Rey "Chiong" T. Uy (Lakas)
  - Vice Mayor: Atty. Eva Lorraine Estabillo (Reporma)
  - Representative: De Carlo "Oyo" Uy (Lakas)
  - City Council: Members: Leo Revita; Atty. Boy Lemos; Ciara Uy-Salazar; Wes Caasi; Engr. Jun Coquilla; Rex Jasper Aala; Romeo Catayas; Cathy Eliot; Edd Mark Wakan; Uloy Ong
  - Electorate: 177,351 voters (2025)

Area
  - Total: 195.8 km^{2} (75.6 sq mi)
- Elevation: 117 m (384 ft)
- Highest elevation: 1,167 m (3,829 ft)
- Lowest elevation: 0 m (0 ft)

Population (2024 census)
  - Total: 300,042
  - Density: 1,532/km^{2} (3,969/sq mi)
  - Households: 71,377
- Demonym(s): Tagumeño, Tagumenyo

Economy
  - Income class: 1st city income class
  - Poverty incidence: 8.52% (2023)
  - Revenue: ₱ 2,602 million (2024)
  - Assets: ₱ 8,380 million (2024)
  - Expenditure: ₱ 2,995 million (2024)
  - Liabilities: ₱ 3,731 million (2024)

Service provider
  - Electricity: Davao Light and Power Company (DLPC)
  - Water: Tagum Water District (all areas); Visayan Village Tagum Rural Waterworks and Multi-Services Cooperative (VITRUWASCO; Visayan Village only)
  - Telecommunications: Converge ICT; Dito Telecommunity; Globe Telecom; PLDT
  - Cable TV: Royal Cable; Wise Cable
- Time zone: UTC+8 (PST)
- ZIP code: 8100
- PSGC: 112319000
- IDD : area code: +63 (0)84
- Native languages: Ata Manobo; Davawenyo; Cebuano; Kalagan; Tagalog
- Numbered highways: AH26 (Maharlika Highway); N74 (Apokon Road); N909
- Major religions: Christianity; Islam
- Catholic diocese: Diocese of Tagum
- Website: tagumcity.gov.ph

Tagum, officially the City of Tagum (Cebuano: Dakbayan sa Tagum; Filipino: Lungsod ng Tagum), is a component city and capital of the Davao del Norte, Philippines. According to the 2024 census, it has a population of 300,042, making it the most populous component city in Mindanao and in Davao del Norte, as well as the second most populous in Davao Region after Davao City.

It is one of the topmost livable cities in the Philippines, and was one of the finalists in the most child-friendly city in the Philippines – component category along with Laoag, and Talisay, Cebu. In the 2021 Cities and Municipalities Competitiveness Index, the city of Tagum ranked third on the overall competitive component cities in the Philippines, fourth on infrastructure, second in resiliency, thirteenth on economic dynamism and first on government efficiency.

== Etymology ==
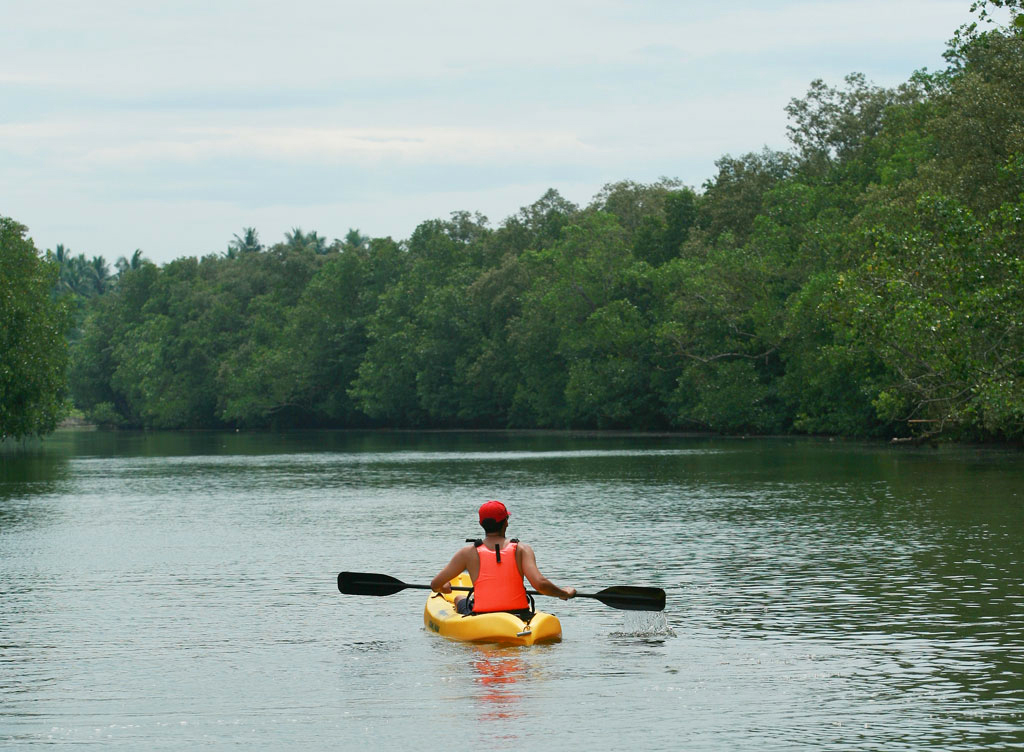
Nabintad River, part of the original river system that flowed around Magugpo and is currently a protected marine sanctuary due to its natural abundance of mangrove trees.

Tagum is a color word from Cebuano that means Indigo. There's also a theory although it's not a supported, that in Kalagans tagyum (or variants tayum, tagung-tagung) refers to the indigo plant (Indigofera tinctoria Linn.). On the one hand, a legend explains how the name Magugpo, the city's former name, came about. At the beginning, Magugpo was nothing but a vast wilderness, inhabited by the Mansakas, Manguangans, Mandayas and the Kalagans in the coastal barangays. The name Magugpo was derived from the native word mago, a name of a certain tree, and ugpo means very high. According to legend, the natives were occupying a river basin inside the thickly covered forest where they could not even see the sun. The creek where the natives dwelt still exists, but the once abundant freshwater is now dead due to pollution.

== History ==
The area of Tagum was inhabited by Mandaya, Maguindanaon and Kagan. By the mid-1800s it was a part and serves as a vassal of Sultanate of Maguindanao and was ruled by the Maguindanaon Datu Bago, which spanned the entire Davao Gulf region and had its capital in what is now Davao City known as Pinagurasan. When the Spanish arrived with soldiers and settlers led by Don Jose Cruz de Uyanguren to take the settlement in 1848, Datu Bago and his warriors resisted for three months until he finally saw the hopelessness of his cause and abandoned the settlement, which the Spanish took soon thereafter and established a town out of it giving it the name Nueva Vergara, which was renamed Davao in 1867. Datu Bago then gathered his followers and reestablished his residence and base at Hijo, present-day Barangay Madaum, in which his wife's Kalagan relatives have a stronghold. From there he continued resisting the Spaniards until his death in 1850. He was buried in present-day Barangay Pagsabangan where his descendants continue to pay respects to the present day.

The Muslim tribes in the area led by their datus continued the anti-Spanish struggle years and decades after Dato Bago's death in 1850. Meanwhile, the district governor of Davao, Don Jose Pinzon y Purga, wanted to establish numerous reductions at the Hijo River to permanently settle the nomadic Mandayans. This particularly earned the anger of the Moro tribes even more, as it meant that such a setup would mean the permanent loss of their lands to the Spaniards. So the datus of Hijo River planned a conspiracy to kill the Spanish governor, and in 1861 they executed their plan, inviting him to a home of another datu where they eventually killed him and his 8 other colleagues. Despite the death of the Spanish governor Pinzon, however, the succeeding governors of Davao went along with the plan of creating reductions for the Mandayas, eventually leading to the creation of reducciones of Hijo, Bincungan and Pagsabangan in 1885. The Moro Kalagans responded with attacks on Mandayan settlements in which many Mandayans were killed, which they did for several years onward until the arrival of the Americans in 1899.

=== Rise to townhood ===
The Spanish authorities left the district of Davao at the aftermath of the Philippine Revolution, and the Americans took over. American prospectors then arrived and set up several plantations at Busaon, Bincungan and Hijo in 1906 and onwards. Tagum became a municipal district of Davao in March 10, 1917, with the passage of Act No. 2711 approved by Governor-General Francis Burton Harrison, with its seat of government located at Hijo in what is now Barangay Madaum. By then only the areas of Bincungan and settlements along the Hijo River were populated, while the rest is still virgin forest and grasslands. It would only be more than twelve years later in October 1929 when the first real transformation of Tagum occurred when the first Christian immigrant, a certain Sulpicio Quirante from Moalboal, Cebu, came and settled in what is now Magugpo Poblacion. He was then followed by other Cebuano pioneers as well as individuals from Luzon and other parts of Visayas who then established their own plots in the area. Physical land developments started to emerge when the migrants organized themselves into the Magugpo Homesteaders' Association and bought the homestead of Lolo Mandaya, a native. They subdivided the land into residential lots of 750 square meters each and sold these lots at ₱1.50 each to newcomers. The amount paid by the buyer also served as a membership fee to the association.

In 1932, Engineers Ignacio and Alib, both from Davao City, together with 15 laborers surveyed the trail for the National Highway. At this time and prior to the creation of the highway, the only means of transportation from Davao City to Tagum was by boat using the Hijo and Tagum Rivers as its points of entry. The first physical landmarks of Magugpo were a school building, a teacher's cottage, a rest house, and a chapel, all of which were constructed by the Homesteaders' Association in the early 1930s.

In 1941, a bill was sponsored by Assemblyman Cesar Sotto, Davao's representative to the National Assembly, that stipulates the incorporation of Tagum from a municipal district of Davao into a full-fledged municipality. Tagum finally became a town with the signing of Executive Order No. 352, issued by then Commonwealth President Manuel L. Quezon on June 23, 1941, establishing the Municipality of Tagum with its seat of government still at Hijo as was before. It had its first local civil government under the leadership of Manuel Baura Suaybaguio, Sr. and Sulpicio Quirante. Both were appointed as the first Mayor and Vice Mayor, respectively. But while the town was still at its infancy as an incorporated settlement, the Second World War broke out in December 1941. The war badly damaged the Magugpo settlement that only five houses were left standing at Magugpo after the liberation. From the rubble, Suaybaguio and Quirante spearheaded the construction of houses, drugstores, stores and a church (which remains on the same site even today). The national government's infrastructure projects such as the Davao-Agusan National Highway and provincial roads going to Kapalong and Saug paved the way to the influx of more migrants from Luzon and Visayas and foreign immigrants to the municipality.

=== Contemporary history ===
The local government of Magugpo was formalized with the holding of the first local election in 1947. Suaybaguio retained his position, gaining a new Vice Mayor in the person of Lucio Berdida.

Significant changes were made such as the renaming of Magugpo to Tagum by virtue of a municipal council resolution. In 1948, Mayor Suaybaguio transferred the seat of government from Hijo to Magugpo Poblacion. The following year the new municipality of Panabo was born. Vice Mayor Berdida who really hailed from the said place was appointed as Panabo's Mayor. This paved the way for Macario Bermudez to become Tagum's Vice Mayor.

Throughout the 1950s onward, Tagum experienced significant changes in both political arena and its physical landscape. Under the administrations of Mayor Eliseo Villanueva Wakan and Mayor Hermigildo Baluyo, in 1951 and 1955 respectively, the people of Tagum witnessed physical transformations in the town. There was massive construction of roads. The Municipal Hall was constructed and moved to its present site. The Municipal Health Center along Bonifacio St. was also put up. A public market site was donated by the Ilocano Pereyras family.

In 1954, the boundary between Tagum, Mabini (formerly Doña Alicia), and Compostela was formalized by Republic Act No. 1102, approved June 15. The boundary line between the municipality of Tagum and Doña Alicia is the Dumlan River from the Gulf of Davao to the source of the river and a straight line from said source running northwestward to the concrete monument in the sitio of Libaybay. The Hijo River was considered the boundary between the municipalities of Tagum and Compostela.

Economically, Tagum was slowly becoming a convenient place for traders to exchange products with neighboring municipalities. The booming abaca and coconut industries in the early 1950s contributed significantly to the growth of the local economy. Alongside the economic development, came the establishment of two schools/colleges, Holy Cross College (now St. Mary's College) and Mindanao Colleges (now the University of Mindanao) which were then the only providers of tertiary education in the province outside Davao City. The presence of these two schools slowly contributed to making Tagum another possible educational center for Davao.

Tagum's role as an important center for various activities made it the capital town of the newly-established province of Davao del Norte in 1967, when the whole of Davao was finally divided into three provinces: del Norte, del Sur, and Oriental. Having become the provincial seat of Davao del Norte, it continued its transformation. In the 1971 local elections Baloyo, after 16 years in office, was replaced by Gelacio "Yayong" Gementiza. Fortunately for Gementiza's administration, the economic losses of the dying abaca sector and the receding importance of the coconut industry were more than offset by the gains of the emerging banana plantations. Indeed, the banana impetus propelled the total development of Tagum into a bustling metropolis. The once sleepy town became the beehive of business activities in Southeastern Mindanao.

The progressive economy then made it easier for Gementiza's administration to undertake infrastructure development projects such as the expansion of the municipal hall, concreting of the public market (through loans from the Development Bank of the Philippines), the asphalting of more municipal roads, and opening of more barangay roads. In the process, various offices were created: Municipal Engineering Office, Municipal Planning and Development Office, Municipal Assessor's Office, and the Fire Station.

The 1980s were turbulent years for Tagum, politically speaking. There was a heavy turnover of local officials for various reasons. Tolentino's administration which started in 1980, was rocked by anomalies, thus forcing him to resign from office 16 months after taking his oath. Tolentino's resignation led to the appointment of Prospero Estabillo as Mayor and Victorio Suaybaguio, Jr. as Vice Mayor. As a result, there were major changes in the positions of the Council Members. Like the rest of the nation, Tagum suffered political instability and serious peace and order problems during the first five years of the decade. The EDSA Revolution in 1986 practically changed the political climate. Baltazar Sator who was appointed OIC-Mayor then was elected as Congressman in 1987. Victorio Suaybaguio, Jr., eventually assumed the leadership of the town after the 1988 election.

In spite of the prevailing political unrest of the early eighties, Tagum continuously enjoyed an expanding economy, though at a slower pace. There might have been a slight slump in the banana industry, but the discovery of abundant mineral resources, specifically gold, in various areas of Davao Province triggered the mini-local economies, not just in Tagum but in the neighboring municipalities as well. Thus, in the later part of the decade, the construction sector grew at an unprecedented pace. Towards the 1990s and onwards, Tagum has been undoubtedly turning itself into a strategic and important growth center in Southeastern Mindanao.

=== Cityhood ===
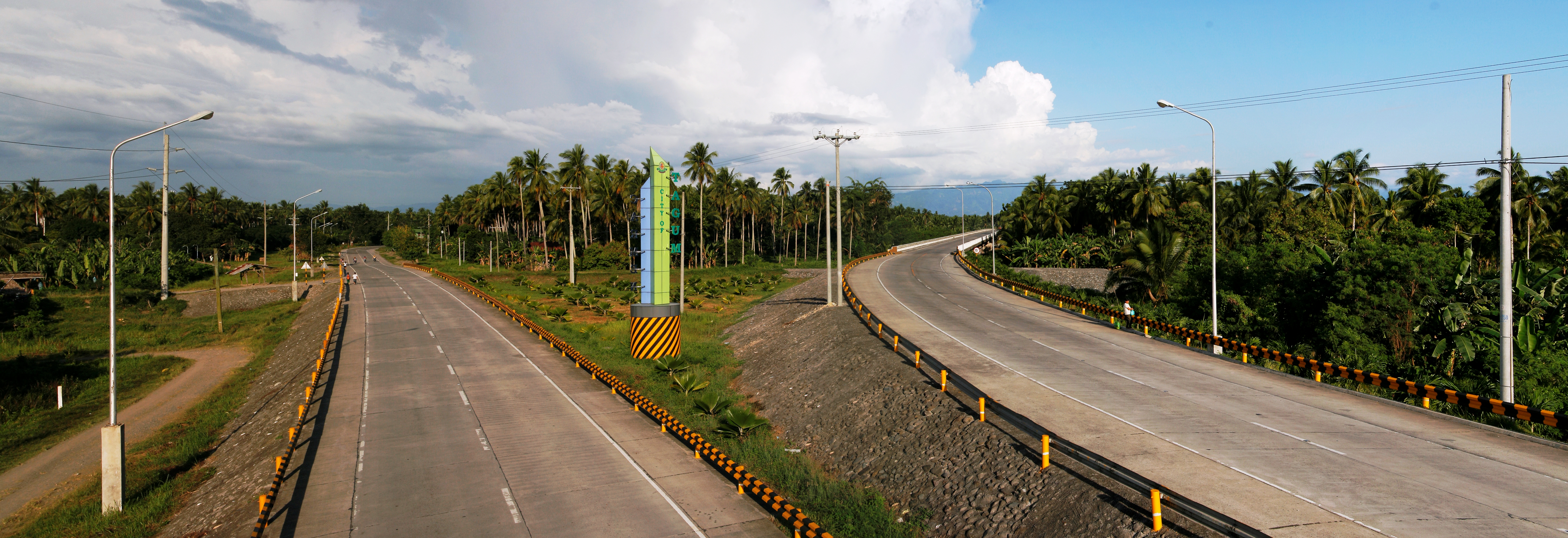
Maharlika Highway - Gov. Generoso Bridge Junction to Tagum (right) and to Carmen (left)

The 1990s have been significant years not only for Tagum, but for the entire Philippine Government bureaucracy. There was a radical change in the system of government through the passage of Republic Act 7160 otherwise known as the Local Government Code of 1991. By virtue of the said Republic Act, decentralization had taken off. The former centralized form of government became decentralized through devolution. As an effect, local government units (LGUs) were given additional functions, powers, authorities and responsibilities.

Although, the decentralization policy of the state was very relevant and vital for local and national development, however, there were also problems and issues that were encountered along the process of its implementation. For Tagum, financial and organizational problems were felt by the local officialdom. This was because the former municipality has broader areas of services with only limited financial and manpower resources. But this situation had been gradually resolved through various revenue-raising strategies and grants/aids from the national and foreign funding institutions.

One of the significant accomplishments of the officialdom of Tagum during the 1990s was its elevation from a second to the first-class municipality. This opened a gateway to increase its financial resources through the Internal Revenue Allocation (IRA) from the national government and local revenues. This was under the leadership of Hon Victorio R. Suaybaguio, Jr. who sat as mayor Tagum for three consecutive terms (1988–1998). As a matter of fact, during the 1995 election, all incumbent elected officials of Tagum, from Mayor down to the municipal councilors, were unopposed, making a significant event in the political history of Tagum.

The fast urbanization of Tagum from the late '80s to 1990 which was attributed to the mushrooming of business establishments and other commercial activities, increasing population and services, and other factors, has caused various problems and needs, like roads, drainage, the increasing numbers of squatters, upscaling trend of traffic congestion in major streets, garbage and sanitation, land use and others. Confronted by this situation, the local government of Tagum engaged in the revision of its Municipal Comprehensive Development Plan (MCDP). This was spearheaded by the Municipal Planning and Development Office (MPDO) with assistance from the University of the Philippines College of Architecture Foundation, Inc. (UP ARKI), Manila and the Housing and Land Use Regulatory Board (HLRB), Region XI.

The MCDP was approved in December 1993. And during that year, Tagum was the second municipality in Region XI which had an approved Municipal Comprehensive Development Plan.

Tagum had increased the number of its barangays when the division of Barangay Poblacion which is an urbanized barangay of Tagum occurred in 1995. This resulted to the creation of four new barangays, namely, Barangay Magugpo North, Barangay Magugpo South, Barangay Magugpo East, and Barangay Magugpo West.

Another important event that happened particularly in 1997 was the transfer of the public market to the new ₱60 million public market which is more than a kilometer away from the old market. The new market was constructed in a seven hectare donated land by the Pereyras family. The said area is also the site of the new Tagum Overland Transport Integrated Terminal (TOTIT) worth ₱60 million and the Livestock Auction Center worth ₱2.5 million.

Foremost of the development of Tagum in the 1990s was its conversion into a component city of Davao del Norte. Congressman Baltazar Sator sponsored House Bill No.7509 in the House of Congress. Prior to its approval, a public hearing was conducted in Tagum by the Committee on Local Government of the House of Congress, chaired by Congressman Ciriaco Alfelor. The said law passed all the requisites in the House of Congress, resulting in its approval. Then, the Republic Act 8472 “An Act Converting the Municipality of Tagum into a City, to be known as the City of Tagum” was passed to the House of Senate through the sponsorship of Senator Vicente Sotto III. The incumbent Municipal Mayor, Victorio R. Suaybaguio, Jr., who served his last term in the office, became the first City Mayor of Tagum. His incumbency as the first city mayor was only for a short period, however, because he resigned from the office to seek for a higher political position. In the May 1998 election, Suaybaguio run as Vice Governor in Davao del Norte. By virtue of the law, Arrel R. Olaño, the incumbent City Vice Mayor took over the position as the City Mayor. However, he only served in his capacity as the mayor for a short period because he also resigned and sought for a higher political position as board member in the provincial government.

==== As City of Tagum ====
Then Mayor Rey T. Uy signing the contract for the construction of the new City Hall of Tagum.

The next higher in rank in the officialdom was the first city councilor in the person of Octavio R. Valle. By this capacity, he took over the position as the Vice Mayor and became the Acting City Mayor of Tagum while running as Vice Mayor in the May 1998 election. The first elected City Officials of Tagum assumed office on July 1, 1998, under the leadership of Mayor Rey T. Uy and Vice Mayor Gerardo R. Racho. In 2001, Uy failed in his reelection bid to Gelacio P. Gementiza, but regained the mayoralty seat in the 2004 elections as Gementiza became provincial governor of Davao del Norte.

The 2007 local elections saw the reelectionists-tandem Uy and Allan L. Rellon pitted against the opposition candidates Meliton D. Lemos and running-mate, Geterito T. Gementiza, with the Uy-Rellon tandem winning by a big margin of votes.

At present, the incumbent local chief executives, with the support of the City Legislative Council and various LGU organizations, initiated political will to forge a new brand of public administration. Mayor Rey T. Uy then replicated some of his management principles and strategies in the corporate world to his local office, with rapid urbanization, improvement of transportation, infrastructure, and public facilities, the rise of more businesses, and improvement of lives amongst Tagumeños. In 2008, due to these improvements, Tagum became the second First-Class city in Davao Region (next to Davao City) with a combined income of PhP463,476,022.99 as recognized by the Department of Finance and Department of the Interior and Local Government.

The 2010 general elections saw again the Uy-Rellon tandem against First District congressman Arrel Olaño and the tandem of Gementiza-Aventurado. Uy and Rellon won by a landslide and were proclaimed days after the said election.

In 2006, Tagum became the Palm Tree City of the Philippines. It also holds an unofficial record for having the tallest Christmas tree in the Philippines. At 153 feet tall, the stunning structure erected at the Freedom Park at the back of the City Hall rivaled Puerto Princesa City's 100 feet tall Christmas tree. Tagum is also the home of the world's biggest wooden rosary, made out of ironwood, located at the Christ The King Cathedral, also one of the region's biggest Catholic churches.

Since 1999, Tagum annually hosts the Musikahan Festival aimed at showcasing the musical talents of Tagumeños, Mindanaoans, and Filipinos in general, draws thousands of visitors both locally and internationally. Currently, the city is the only one in the Philippines to have a direct joint agreement with Venezuela for cultural exchange, in line with the 11th Musikahan sa Tagum in 2011, thus supporting the city's claim as The Cultural Center of Mindanao, and as affirmed by the University of the Philippines Diliman College of Music and College of Arts and Letters.

Tagum hosted three major national competitions in 2010, to wit, the National English Jazz Chants Festival, the National Schools Press Conference and the 9th Musikahan Festival. The 3rd International Rondalla Festival, the first international competition Tagum hosted in 2011, implanted the city into the roster of cultural hubs in Southeast Asia.

In recognition for the city's efforts in strengthening literacy in the region, the United Nations Educational, Scientific and Cultural Organization (UNESCO) will confer the Honourable Mention for the King Sejong International Literacy Prize to the City Literacy Coordinating Council of Tagum for its “Peace Management Literacy and Continuing Education through Night Market” programme.

Vice Mayor Allan L. Rellon succeeded Uy as the City Mayor during the 2013 Midterm elections, with Geterito "Boyet" T. Gemetiza succeeding Rellon's earlier post.

== Geography ==
Tagum has a total land area of 19,580 hectares (48,400 acres), which is predominantly agricultural, and produces various kinds of crops like coconut, rice, Cavendish banana, fruit trees like durian, lanzones and other agricultural crops for non-commercial use.

The city is strategically located at the northern portion of Southern Mindanao and lies in the intersection of three major road network systems namely: the Phil-Japan Friendship Highway, the Davao-Mati-Agusan road, and the soon to be completed Davao-Bukidnon road that connects the city to other major destinations in the region and in the rest of Mindanao. With this, the city serves as a vital economic crossroad not only for the province but for the entire Davao Region as well, linking Davao City to the northern city of Butuan (in Agusan del Norte), to Mati (in Davao Oriental) and the Surigao provinces.

The city is located 55 kilometers north of Davao City, the main economic and administrative center of Region XI. It takes about 1 hour and 30 minutes travel to Davao City. The city lies between 7°26′ N latitude and 125°48' E Longitude. It is bounded by the Municipalities of Asuncion, New Corella, and Mawab on the north, Maco on the east, and Braulio E. Dujali on the west. Carmen lies on its southwestern borders, while it faces Davao Gulf directly to the south.

=== Climate ===
Climate data for Tagum
Month	Jan	Feb	Mar	Apr	May	Jun	Jul	Aug	Sep	Oct	Nov	Dec	Year
Mean daily maximum °C (°F)	29 (84)	29 (84)	30 (86)	31 (88)	30 (86)	30 (86)	30 (86)	30 (86)	30 (86)	30 (86)	30 (86)	30 (86)	30 (86)
Mean daily minimum °C (°F)	22 (72)	22 (72)	22 (72)	23 (73)	24 (75)	24 (75)	24 (75)	24 (75)	24 (75)	24 (75)	23 (73)	22 (72)	23 (74)
Average precipitation mm (inches)	98 (3.9)	86 (3.4)	91 (3.6)	83 (3.3)	133 (5.2)	158 (6.2)	111 (4.4)	101 (4.0)	94 (3.7)	117 (4.6)	131 (5.2)	94 (3.7)	1,297 (51.2)
Average rainy days	16.4	14.3	16.3	18.5	25.3	25.0	23.8	21.9	20.8	24.4	24.3	18.7	249.7
Source: Meteoblue

Tagum has a tropical rainforest climate (type Af) under the Köppen climate classification system. The city enjoys weather that remains balmy all year round. It is characterized by a uniform distribution of rainfall, temperature, humidity, and air pressure. It has no pronounced wet or dry season. Weather predictability makes it highly conducive to agricultural production. Temperature ranges from 20 to 32 °C and average rainfall is up to 1,300 mm yearly.

=== Barangays ===
Tagum is politically subdivided into 23 barangays. Each barangay consists of puroks while some have sitios.

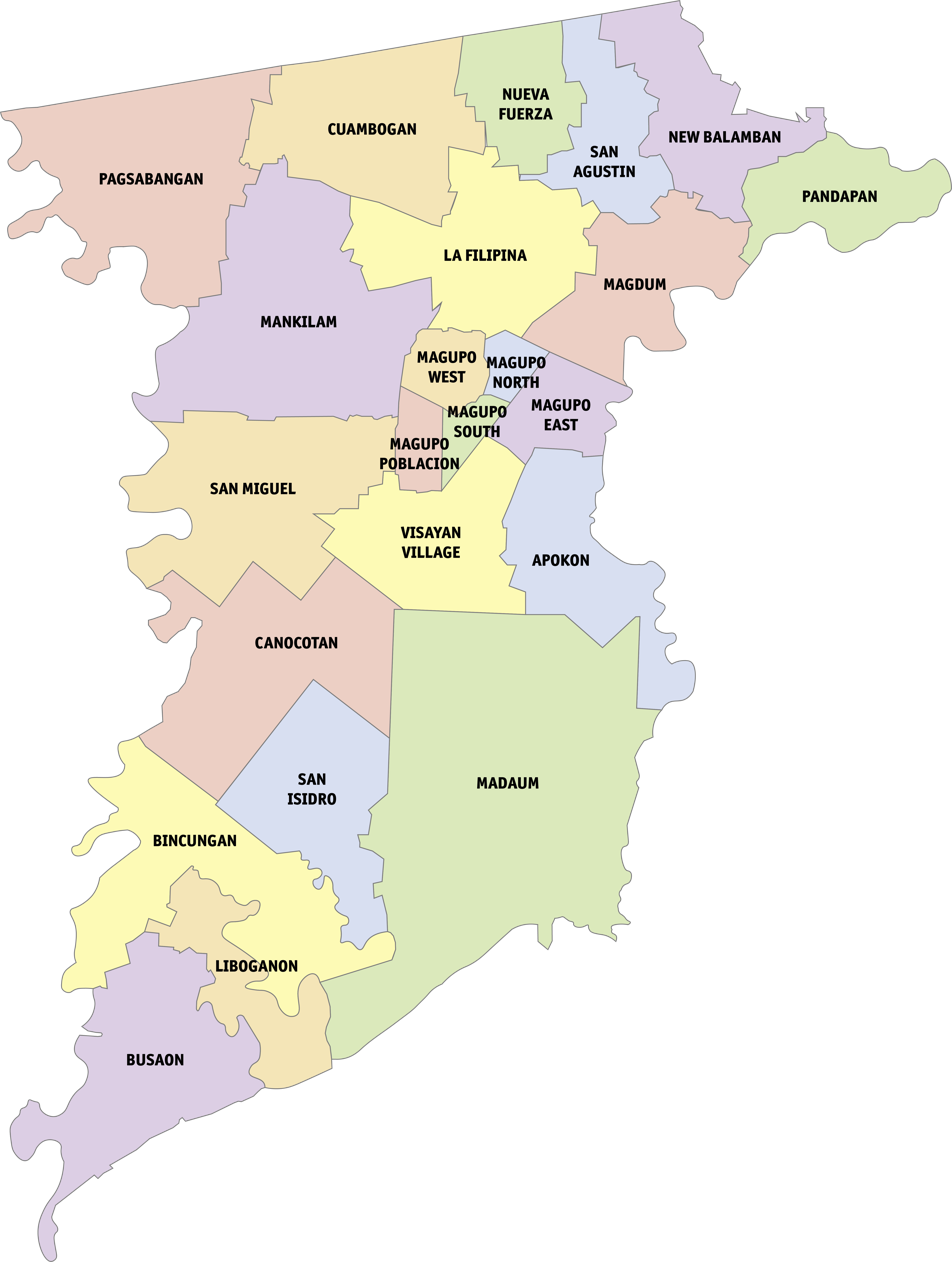
Political map of Tagum, Davao del Norte

Barangay	Population (according to 2024 census)	Area (in hectares)
Apokon	40,500	2,630
Bincungan	4,113	1,485
Busaon	3,450	1,056
Canocotan	9,510	2,655
Cuambogan	13,416	880
La Filipina	23,556	550
Liboganon	3,035	612
Madaum	15,454	2,665
Magdum	13,331	2,655
Magugpo Poblacion	2,081	980.55
Magugpo East	15,065	255.51
Magugpo North	8,530	73.48
Magugpo South	10,182	134.03
Magugpo West	12,710	216.43
Mankilam	42,540	1,176
New Balamban	1,654	520
Nueva Fuerza	2,709	616
Pagsabangan	5,332	1,350
Pandapan	2,471	530
San Agustin	1,628	522
San Isidro	4,832	802
San Miguel (Camp 4)	23,022	609
Visayan Village	40,921	1,520

== Demographics ==
Population census of Tagum
Year	Pop.	±% p.a.
1918	6,371	—
1939	19,808	+5.55%
1948	29,678	+4.59%
1960	28,982	−0.20%
1970	47,324	+5.02%
1975	64,225	+6.32%
1980	86,201	+6.06%
1990	135,440	+4.62%
1995	156,588	+2.76%
2000	179,531	+2.97%
2007	215,967	+2.58%
2010	242,801	+4.35%
2015	259,444	+1.27%
2020	296,202	+2.83%
2024	300,042	+0.31%
Source: Philippine Statistics Authority

== Economy ==
Poverty incidence of Tagum (%)

Source: Philippine Statistics Authority

Tagum, from being a predominantly agricultural area, has become Mindanao's fastest-growing urban city due to its strategic location, being in the crossroads between the rural areas of Davao del Norte and Davao de Oro and the urban Metro Davao. Blessed with a developed infrastructure, the city manages to export goods like wood chips, veneer plywood, and wood lumber. Fresh bananas, however, remain as the chief export product.

Thanks to the influx of people from the countryside of Davao del Norte and Davao de Oro the rise of human resources has helped a lot in the revenue generation of the city.

Tourism has also become of the city's main economic powerhouse lately. With fifteen festivals in the city's calendar, small and medium entrepreneurs, or SMEs, and the transportation sector have benefited from the rapid influx of domestic and international visitors visiting the various festivals in the city.

== Transportation ==
Tagum City is the second busiest city in Davao Region and 8th in Mindanao, making the city accessible by land transportation to different parts of Mindanao. The existing land transportation in the city consists of jeepneys from nearby municipalities and barangays, single motorcycles, and tricycles (e.g. pedicabs), which is the primary mode of transportation in this city. Public utility vehicles in Tagum City Overland Transport Integrated Terminal bound to following municipalities and cities: Santo Tomas, Kapalong, Asuncion, Talaingod, Panabo City, Carmen, Braulio Dujali, New Corella, San Isidro, Laak, Maco, Mabini, Pantukan, Mawab, Nabunturan, Banaybanay, Lupon and Governor Generoso.

Bus companies like Davao Metro Shuttle, Del Norte Fighters and Land Car Inc. ply route from Tagum City to Davao City, New Bataan and Panabo City. Buses from Butuan, Surigao City, Ormoc City, Tacloban City, Manila, Mati City and Davao City are housed in Tagum City Overland Transport Integrated Terminal to cater their passenger needs.

Tagum is bisected by N1 (Maharlika Highway), which serves as a principal arterial for the city, as well as a major route between Davao City and areas to the north. Other major highways include N909 (Tagum City Diversion Road), which serves the adjacent municipalities to the west, and N74 (Apokon Road), which runs to Davao Oriental. Due to the worsening traffic condition in the city, the local government unit and DPWH had agreed on the construction of a 1.6 kilometer flyover along Daang Maharlika. This flyover will stretch from CAP Building (Visayan Village) to Kar Asia (Magugpo East). The project costs ₱3 billion and construction has started in September 2017.

Aside from the reconstruction of Hijo Port to Tagum International Container Port (the second biggest port in the Philippines upon completion), Tagum City is also eyed to be the site of the newest airport in the region. This new gateway is planned ahead to decongest the nearby Francisco Bangoy International Airport in Davao City.

== Health Care ==
Some of the medical centers in Tagum are the following:

- Aquino Specialists Medical Hospital
- Christ The King Hospital (formerly Bishop Regan Memorial Hospital)
- Davao Regional Medical Center - one of the best public hospitals in the Philippines
- Medical Mission Group Hospital and Health Services Cooperative of Tagum
- Midpark Medical Center [U/C]
- Palm City Medical Center [U/C]
- St. Genevieve Hospital
- Tagum Medical City
- Tagum Global Medical Center (owned by ACE Medical Group of Companies)
- Tagum Doctors' Hospital
- United Doctors' Hospital

== Education ==
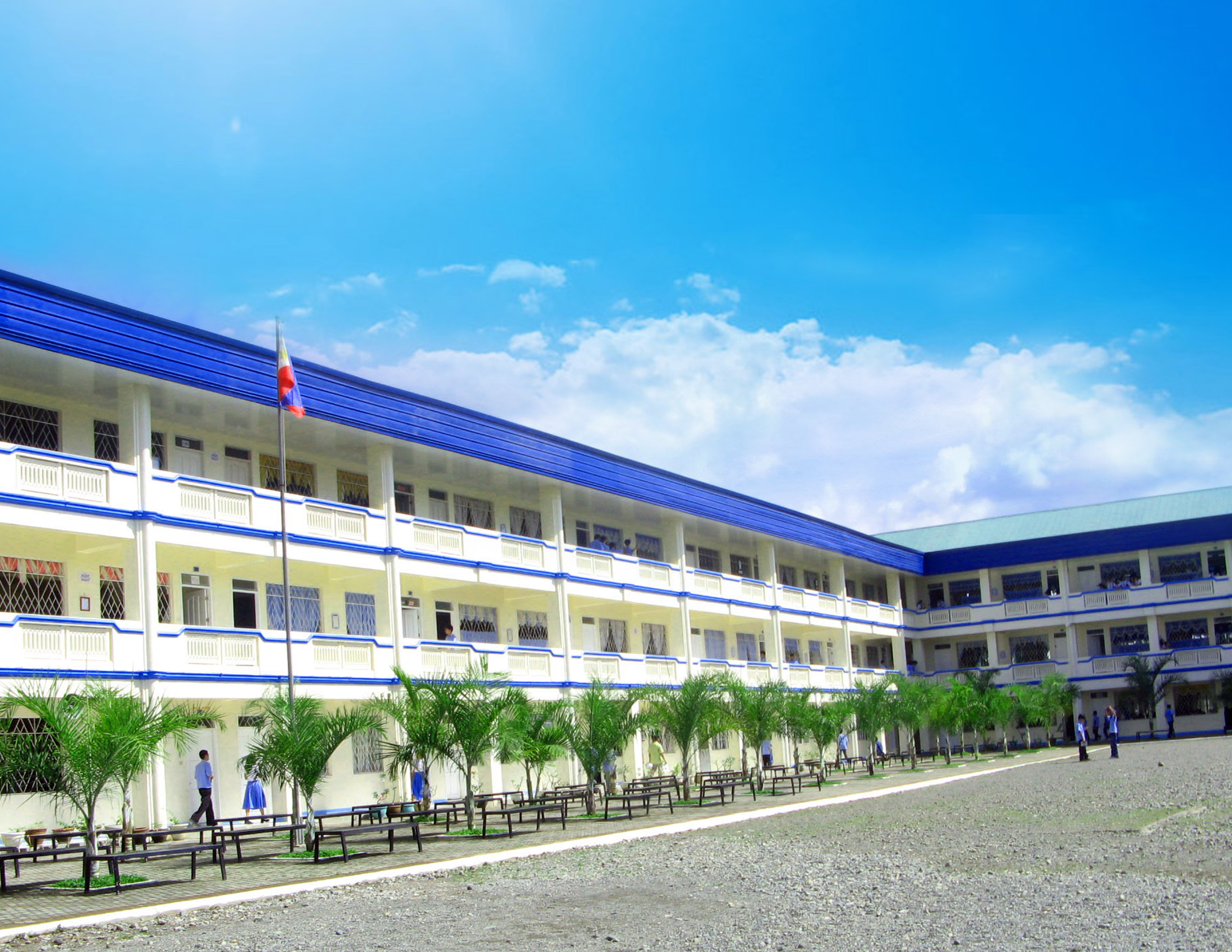
Tagum City National High School

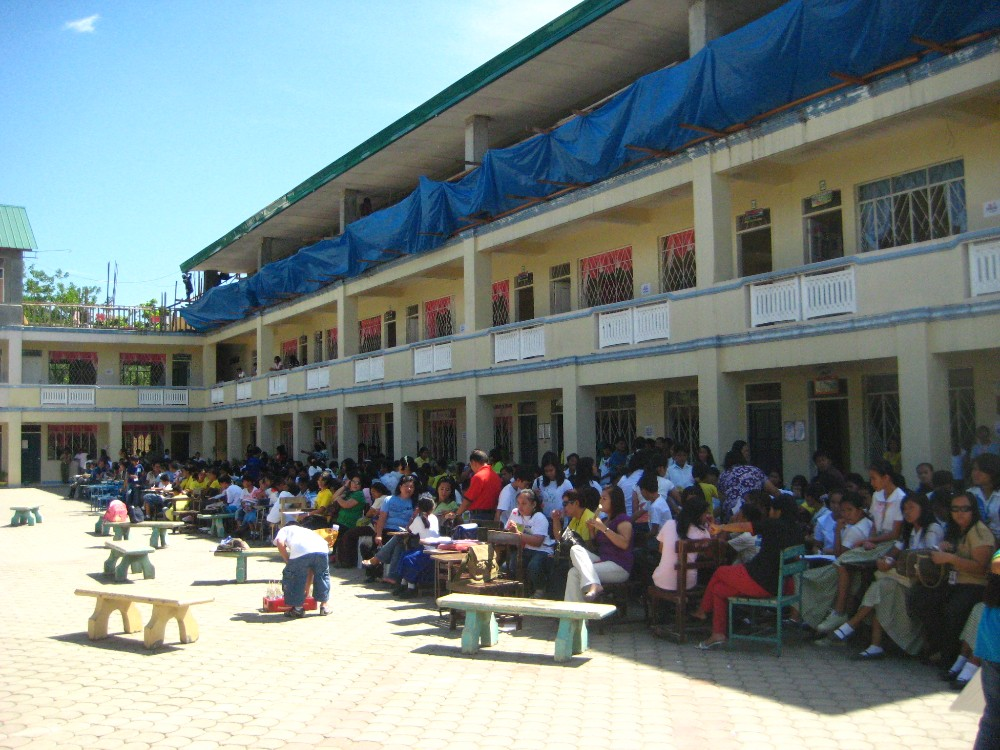
Tagum City National Comprehensive High School

La Filipina National High School

Tagum is known for its successful literacy program in schools spearheaded by the Project REY (Reading Empowers Youth) Project and the leadership of the LGU in education-related activities. The City Government is also known for its school construction projects, known as "LGU Type" buildings, built to improve the school facilities in Tagum, in general. The most notable schools with these construction projects are Tagum City National High School, Davao del Norte Pilot Central School, and Tagum City National Comprehensive High School.

With these, Tagum City won as National Champion (Component City Category) in the Search for the Most Outstanding LGU in the Implementation of the National Literacy Program in the year 2001. In addition, in the years 2004 and 2005, Tagum City ended as 2nd Place Winner in the National Level (Component City Category) Search for the Most Outstanding LGU in the Implementation of the National Literacy Program.

Tagum has been chosen by the Department of Education as the host for the National Schools Press Conference in February 2010, with all public schools housing all participants while two private schools are commissioned as contest areas for writing, layout, and scriptwriting events.

Tagum has 22 colleges, 12 high schools, and 35 primary institutions offering elementary education.

=== Tertiary education ===
Universities

- University of Mindanao (Central and Visayan Village Campus) Tagum College (UMTC)
- University of Southeastern Philippines (USeP) - Tagum-Mabini Campus (Tagum Unit)

Colleges

- Academia de Davao (Davao Academy)
- ACES Tagum College (ATC) - (Main Campus)
- AMA Computer Learning Center Tagum Campus (ACLC)
- Arriesgado College Foundation Inc.(ACFI)
- CARD-MRI Development Institute, Inc. (CMDI)
- Colegio de Capitolio
- Computer Innovation Center (CIC)
- Liceo de Davao - Tagum City (LDD)
- Narisma Computer Literacy
- North Davao College Tagum Foundation (NDC Tagum City)
- Philippine Institute of Technical Education (PITE)
- Queen of Apostles College Seminary (QACS)
- Sandugo Institute of Technology (SIT)
- St.John Learning Center of Tagum City
- St. Mary's College of Tagum, Inc. (SMC)
- St. Michael Technical School
- St. Therese Driving School
- St. Thomas More School of Law and Business;
- STI Tagum
- Tagum Longford College (TLC)
- Tagum City College of Science and Technology Foundation Inc.
- Tagum City Institute of Technology
- Tagum Doctors College, Inc. (TDCI)
- Tagum National Trade School
- Philippine Nippon Technical College (the first Japanese College in Mindanao)
- Rizal Memorial Colleges (Tagum City Campus)

=== Secondary education ===
Public high schools

- Busaon Integrated School (BIS)
- Canocotan National High School (CNHS)
- La Filipina National High School (LFNHS)
- Laureta National High School (LNHS)
- Liboganon Integrated School (LIS)
- Magdum National High School (MNHS)
- Pagsabangan National High School (PNHS)
- Pandapan Integrated School (PIS)
- Jose Tuason Jr. Memorial National High School (JTJMNHS)
- Pipisan Maug National High School (PMNHS)
- Tagum City National Comprehensive High School (TCNCHS)
- Tagum City National High School (TCNHS)
- Tagum National Trade School (TNTS) / Tagum City Trade School (TCTS)

Private high schools

- University of Mindanao Tagum College (UMTC)
- Arriesgado College Foundation Inc. (ACFI)
- Assumpta School of Tagum (AST)
- CARD-MRI Development Institute, Inc. (CMDI)
- Liceo de Davao (LDD)
- Letran de Davao, Inc. (LDDI)
- Max Mirafuentes Academy (MMA)
- San Lorenzo Ruiz Academy of Tagum (SLRAT)
- Santo Nino College of Science and Technology
- St. Mary's College of Tagum (SMC)
- Tagum Longford College (TLC)

== Media ==
Tagum, being in the broadcast range from television and cable stations based in Davao City, had no indigenous media industry until 2005, when Manila Broadcasting Company now MBC Media Group started airing as 107.9 Radyo Natin Tagum (DXWG). Four radio stations started airing after the local media explosion in 2007. Another radio station, 100.7 Radio Caritas FM, started airing in the waves by January 2010. And in November 2014, the first Christian Contemporary radio and TV station, 93.5 Care Radio & Care tv9 (CARE TELERADIO), started airing purely Christian music.

Aside from the nine radio stations, Tagum has four AM Stations, several local tabloids and newspapers and two local cable channels. PTV DavNor TV 48 is the first local TV station to operate in Tagum in 2017, and is currently owned by the government.

The LGU also supports in the information campaign through the City Information Office, publishing annual magazines and managing the City Government's web portal, where news, visuals, photos, videos and forums are posted.

== Tourism ==
Due to improvements of infrastructure, 49 cities and municipalities all over the country from as far north as the town of Aguinaldo in Ifugao province and farther south, the town of Bongao in Tawi-Tawi province, had sent Lakbay Aral tour officials to Tagum.

Also, students from different schools and universities in the region have conducted study tours and field trips to the city, due to the diversity of its tourist spots, accessibility to transport, and high security standards.

The fourteen festivals held around the year also bring tourists, both locally and internationally, to the city, most notably during the Musikahan season (the 2010 celebrations coincided with the city's hosting of the National Schools Press Conference), Durian Festival, Christmas celebrations and the New Year celebrations, where people from nearby Davao City witness the 30-minute fireworks show, as their City Government prohibit the firing of any form of fireworks so as to avoid casualties; the 30-minute fireworks are held in Briz District and can be clearly seen at Poblacion, Magdum, Visayan Village and Canocotan.

Aside from that, people from neighboring municipalities and provinces visit Tagum for commercial, business, civil and personal purposes, as the city now hosts major amenities and services that ease up congestion in Davao City. This rate will increase toward the end of this year as more commercial establishments are being constructed in the city, notably malls, hotels, restaurants and public facilities.

== Sister cities ==
National cities/towns
- Makati
- Mandaluyong
- Manila
- Parañaque
- Calamba, Laguna
- Cebu City
- Cagayan de Oro
- Mati, Davao Oriental
- Butuan
- Malaybalay, Bukidnon
- Ozamiz, Misamis Occidental
- Ormoc, Leyte
- Cotabato City, Maguindanao
- Valencia, Bukidnon
- Carmen, Bohol
- General Trias, Cavite

Twin cities
- Davao City
- Panabo, Davao del Norte

Friendship cities/towns
- Digos, Davao del Sur
- Lapu-Lapu
- Angeles City
- Malita, Davao Occidental

== Notable people ==
- Pantaleon Alvarez, politician, the former Speaker of the House of Representatives of the Philippines and a Congressman from the First District of Davao del Norte
- Jay Durias, singer
- Iwa Moto, actress, model and runner up of StarStruck (season 3)
- Arrel Olaño, politician
- Maris Racal, actress and runner-up of Pinoy Big Brother: All In
- Allan L. Rellon, politician former mayor of Tagum 2013–2022

== Gallery ==
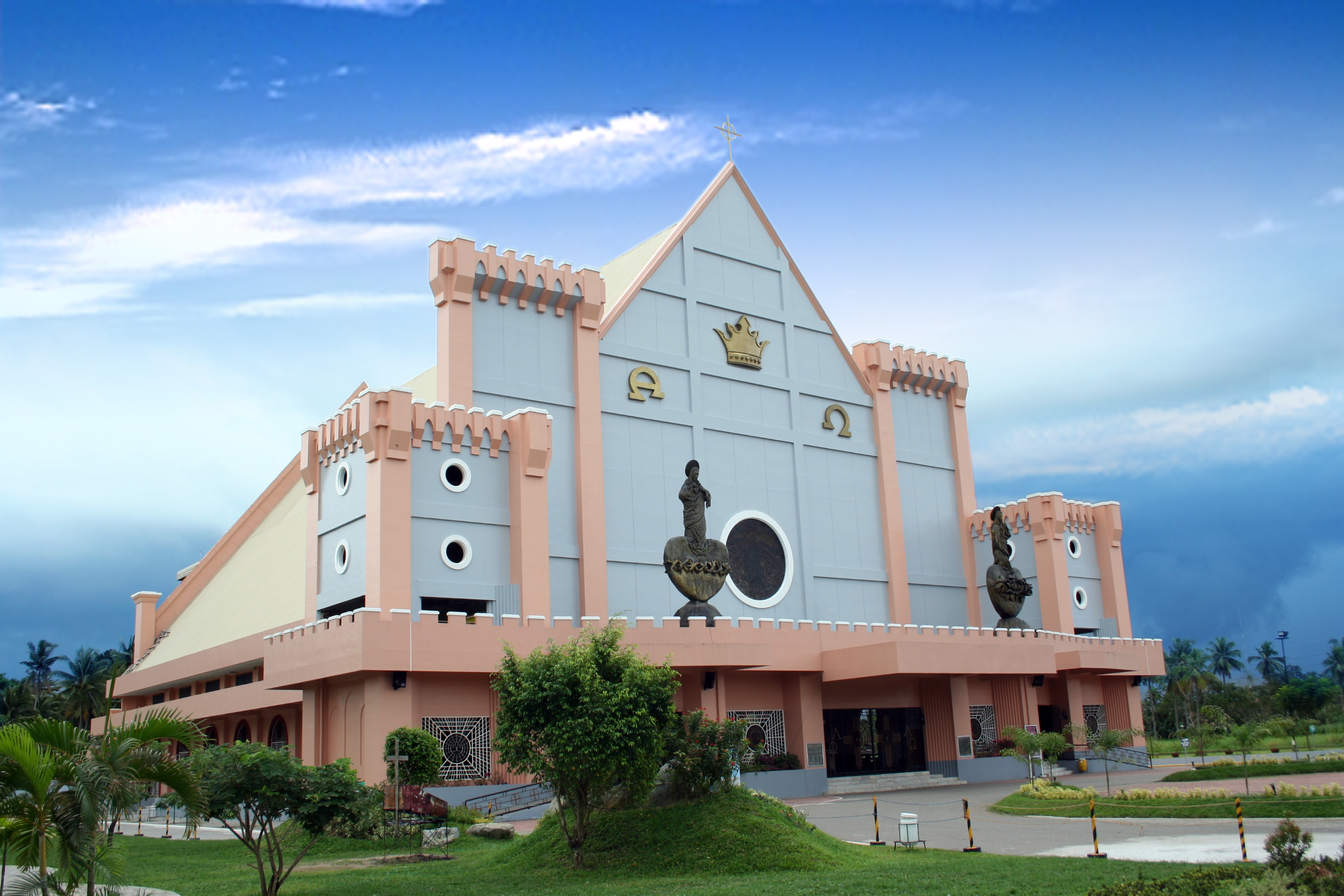
Christ The King Cathedral, the biggest Catholic cathedral in Mindanao

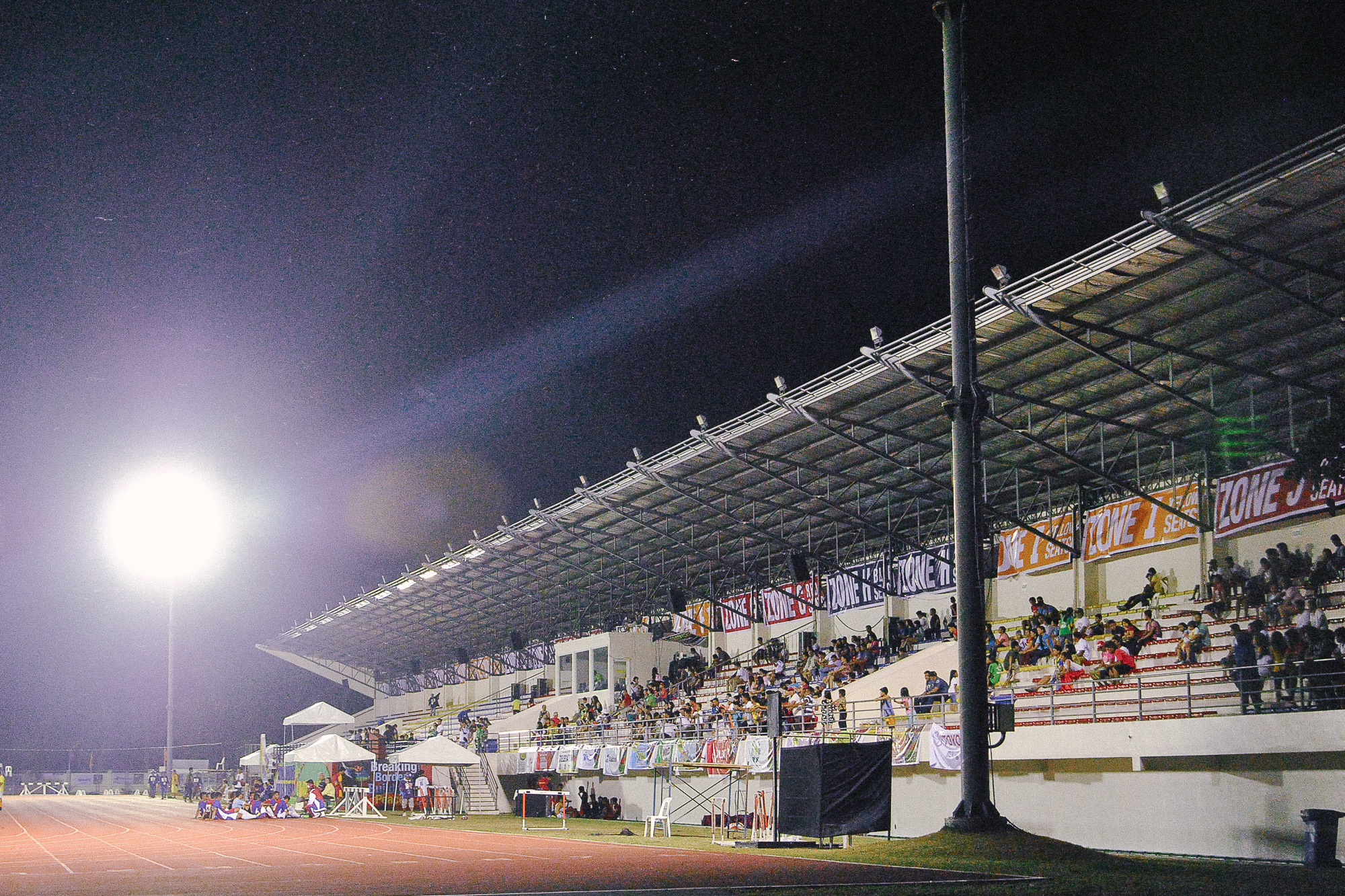
Davao del Norte Sports and Tourism Complex (DNSTC) main grandstand

The Resurrected Christ and the world's largest wooden rosary

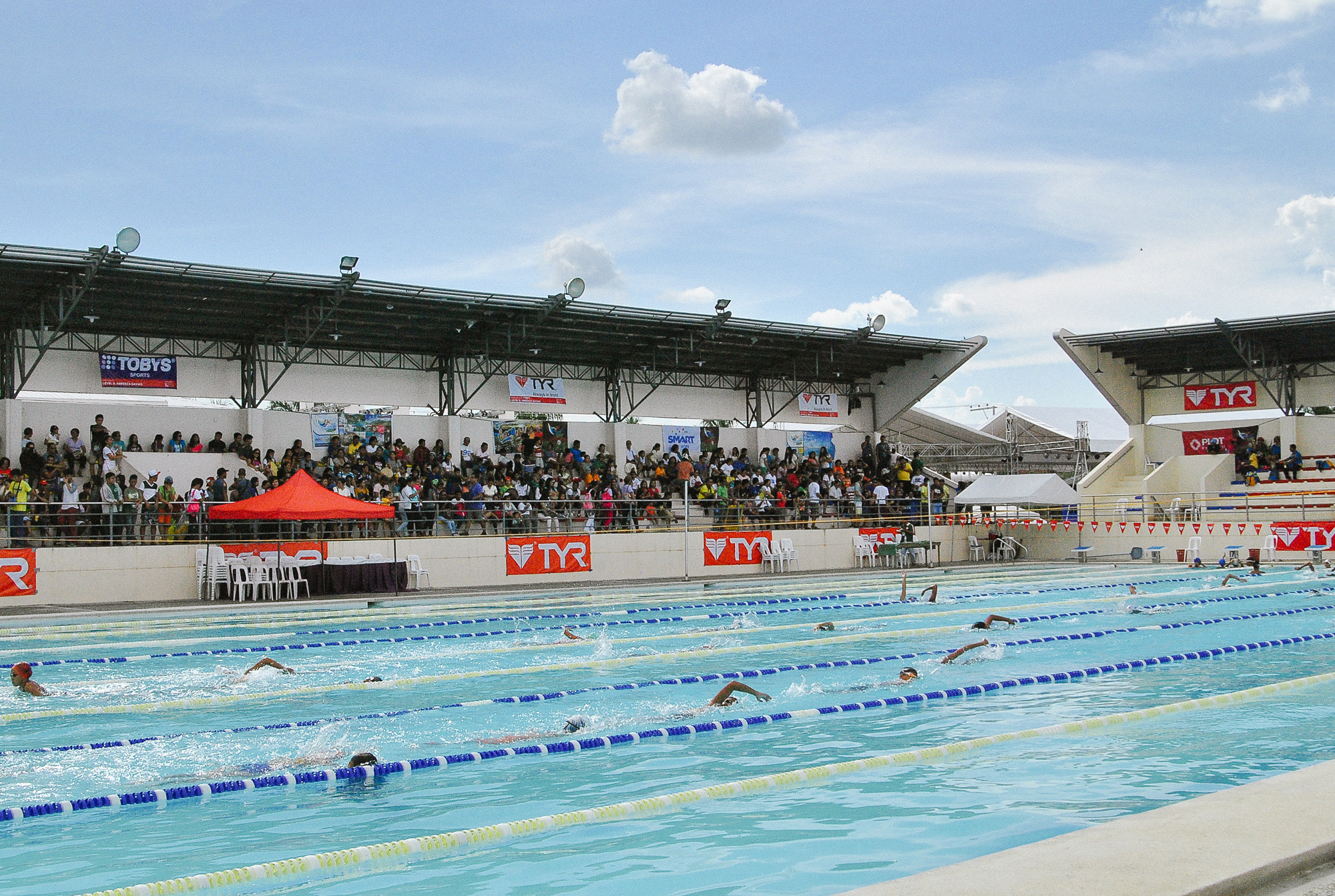
DNSTC Aquatic Center

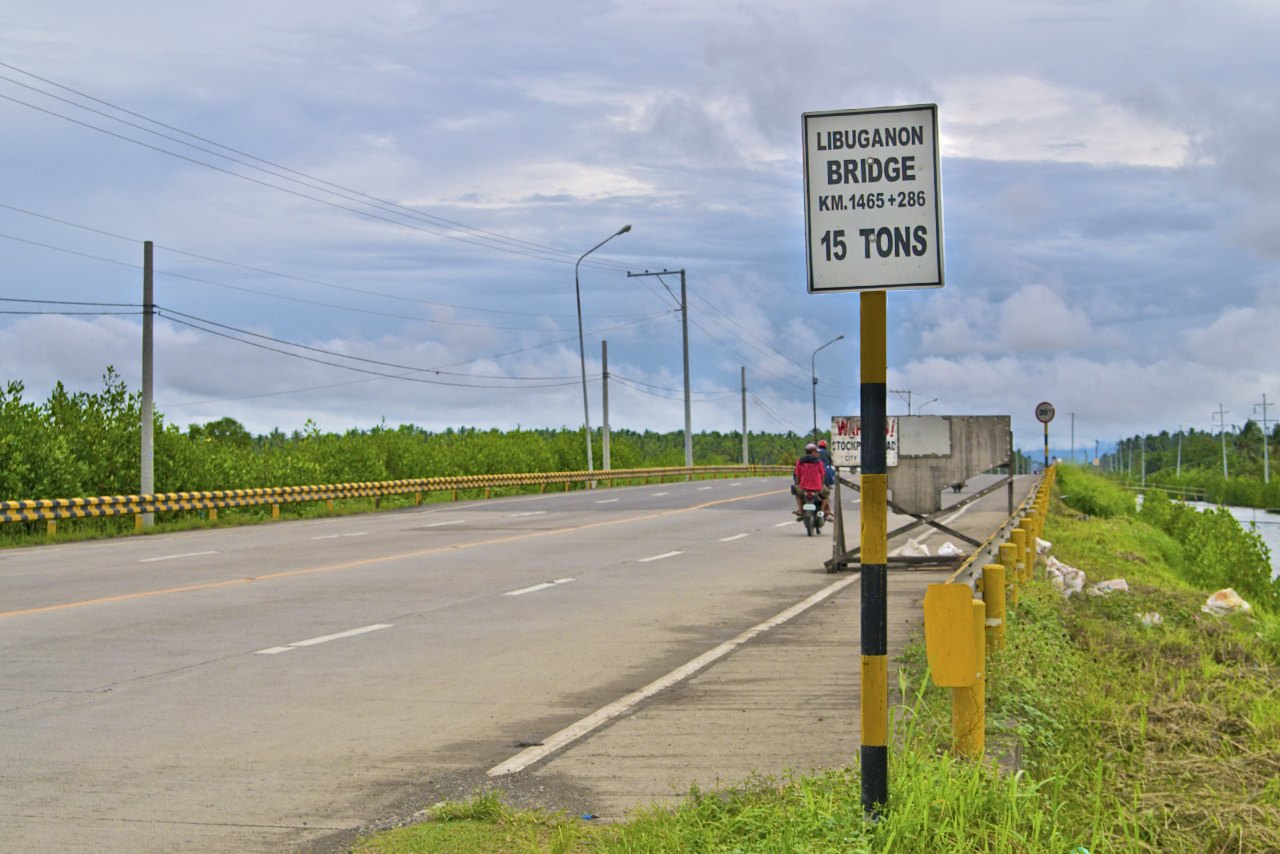
Libuganon Bridge

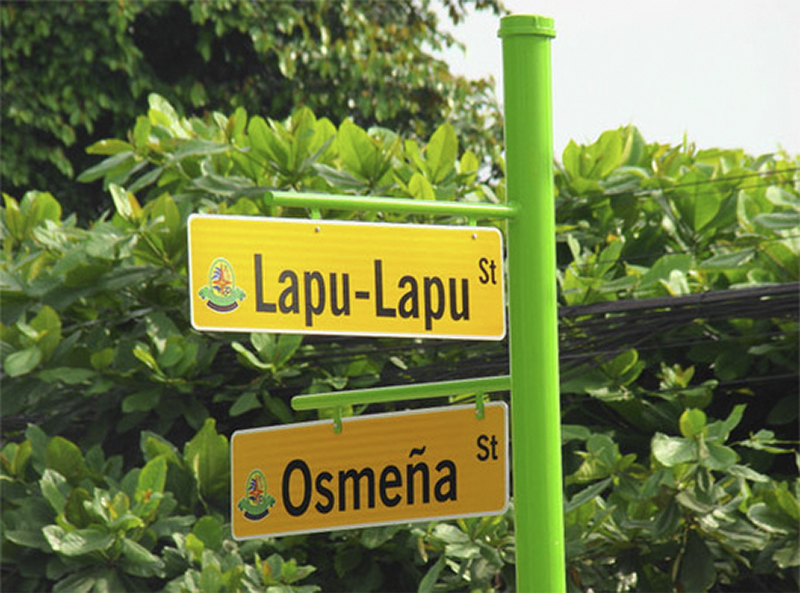
Street signs
