= Davao del Norte's 1st congressional district =

Legislative district of the Philippines

- Constituency for the House of Representatives of the Philippines
- Location of Davao del Norte within the Philippines
- Province: Davao del Norte
- Region: Davao Region
- Population: 504,077 (2015)
- Electorate: 337,583 (2022)
- Major settlements: 6 LGUs: Cities; Tagum; Municipalities; Asuncion; Kapalong; New Corella; San Isidro; Talaingod
- Area: 2,395.64 km^{2} (924.96 sq mi)

Current constituency
- Created: 1987
- Representative: Oyo Uy
- Political party: Lakas
- Congressional bloc: Majority

Davao del Norte's 1st congressional district is one of the two congressional districts of the Philippines in the province of Davao del Norte. It has been represented in the House of Representatives since 1987. The district covers the northern and eastern parts of the province including its capital, Tagum, and the municipalities of Asuncion, Kapalong, New Corella, San Isidro and Talaingod. It is currently represented in the 20th Congress by Oyo Uy of the Lakas–CMD (Lakas).

From 1987 to 1998, the district covered the eastern municipalities of Compostela, Maragusan, Mawab, Monkayo, Montevista, Nabunturan, and New Bataan. These municipalities comprised much of the Compostela Valley and were separated from Davao del Norte to form the present-day province of Davao de Oro in 1998.

== Representation history ==
#	Image	Member	Term of office		Congress	Party	Electoral history	Constituent LGUs
#	Image	Member	Start	End	Congress	Party	Electoral history	Constituent LGUs
=== Davao del Norte's 1st district for the House of Representatives of the Philippines ===
District created February 2, 1987 from Davao del Norte's at-large district.
1		Lorenzo S. Sarmiento	June 30, 1987	June 30, 1992	8th	Lakas ng Bansa	Elected in 1987.	1987–1992; Compostela, Mawab, Monkayo, Montevista, Nabunturan, New Bataan, San Mariano
2		Rogelio M. Sarmiento	June 30, 1992	June 30, 1998	9th	Lakas	Elected in 1992.	1992–1998; Compostela, Maragusan, Mawab, Monkayo, Montevista, Nabunturan, New Bataan
2		Rogelio M. Sarmiento	June 30, 1992	June 30, 1998	10th	Lakas	Re-elected in 1995. Redistricted to Compostela Valley's 1st district.	1992–1998; Compostela, Maragusan, Mawab, Monkayo, Montevista, Nabunturan, New Bataan
3		Pantaleon Alvarez	June 30, 1998	January 24, 2001	11th	Reporma (LAMMP)	Elected in 1998. Resigned on appointment as Secretary of Transportation and Communications.	1998–present Asuncion, Kapalong, New Corella, San Isidro, Tagum, Talaingod
3		Pantaleon Alvarez	June 30, 1998	January 24, 2001	11th	PMP (LAMMP)	Elected in 1998. Resigned on appointment as Secretary of Transportation and Communications.	1998–present Asuncion, Kapalong, New Corella, San Isidro, Tagum, Talaingod
4		Arrel Olaño	June 30, 2001	June 30, 2010	12th	Lakas	Elected in 2001.	1998–present Asuncion, Kapalong, New Corella, San Isidro, Tagum, Talaingod
4		Arrel Olaño	June 30, 2001	June 30, 2010	13th	Lakas	Re-elected in 2004.	1998–present Asuncion, Kapalong, New Corella, San Isidro, Tagum, Talaingod
4		Arrel Olaño	June 30, 2001	June 30, 2010	14th	Lakas	Re-elected in 2007.	1998–present Asuncion, Kapalong, New Corella, San Isidro, Tagum, Talaingod
5		Antonio Rafael G. del Rosario	June 30, 2010	June 30, 2016	15th	Liberal	Elected in 2010.	1998–present Asuncion, Kapalong, New Corella, San Isidro, Tagum, Talaingod
5		Antonio Rafael G. del Rosario	June 30, 2010	June 30, 2016	16th	Liberal	Re-elected in 2013.	1998–present Asuncion, Kapalong, New Corella, San Isidro, Tagum, Talaingod
(3)		Pantaleon Alvarez	June 30, 2016	June 30, 2025	17th	PDP–Laban	Elected in 2016.	1998–present Asuncion, Kapalong, New Corella, San Isidro, Tagum, Talaingod
(3)		Pantaleon Alvarez	June 30, 2016	June 30, 2025	18th	Reporma	Re-elected in 2019.	1998–present Asuncion, Kapalong, New Corella, San Isidro, Tagum, Talaingod
(3)		Pantaleon Alvarez	June 30, 2016	June 30, 2025	19th	Reporma	Re-elected in 2022.	1998–present Asuncion, Kapalong, New Corella, San Isidro, Tagum, Talaingod
6		De Carlo Uy	June 30, 2025	Incumbent	20th	Lakas	Elected in 2025.	1998–present Asuncion, Kapalong, New Corella, San Isidro, Tagum, Talaingod

== Election results ==
=== 2025 ===
Candidate	Party	Votes	%
De Carlo Uy	Lakas–CMD	147,057	55.77
Nickel Suaybaguio	Partido Federal ng Pilipinas	97,519	36.98
Cesar Cuntapay	Partido Demokratiko Pilipino	14,210	5.39
Edwin Concon	Independent	3,655	1.39
Cesar Granada	Independent	1,241	0.47
Total		263,682	100.00
Valid votes		263,682	90.86
Invalid/blank votes		26,529	9.14
Total votes		290,211	100.00
Registered voters/turnout		347,453	83.53
Lakas–CMD gain from Partido para sa Demokratikong Reporma			
Source: Commission on Elections

=== 2022 ===
2022 Philippine House of Representatives elections in the 1st District of Davao del Norte
Party	Candidate	Votes	%
Reporma	Pantaleon Alvarez (incumbent)	143,057	
Hugpong	Bong Aala	81,575	
Total votes			100.00
Reporma hold			

=== 2019 ===
2019 Philippine House of Representatives elections in the 1st District of Davao del Norte
Party	Candidate	Votes	%
PDP–Laban	Pantaleon Alvarez (incumbent)	164,270	
Hugpong	Anthony del Rosario	68,470	
Independent	Carlos "Caloy" Rafales	407	
Total votes			100.00
PDP–Laban hold			

== See also ==
- Legislative districts of Davao del Norte

House of Representatives of the Philippines
Preceded by Quezon City's 4th congressional district	Home district of the speaker July 25, 2016 – July 23, 2018	Succeeded by Pampanga's 2nd congressional district
