= Davao de Oro State College =

Public college in Davao de Oro, Philippines

- Kolehiyong Pampamahalaan ng Davao de Oro (Filipino)
- Former name: Compostela Valley State College (2013-2021)
- Type: State college
- Established: 2013
- Affiliations: PASUC
- President: Lilybeth M. Matunhay, PhD
- Location: Compostela, Davao de Oro, Philippines; 7°40′37″N 126°05′09″E
- Location in Mindanao Location in the Philippines

Davao de Oro State College (DdOSC; Filipino: Kolehiyong Pampamahalaan ng Davao de Oro) is a state college in Davao de Oro, Philippines. It was established in 2013 as Compostela Valley State College through Republic Act No. 10598, with its main campus in Compostela and integrating therewith the External Studies Units of Bukidnon State University in the province, namely, Monkayo, Maragusan, Montevista, and New Bataan. It was renamed to its present name in 2021 through Republic Act No. 11575, shortly after the renaming of the province.

== See also ==
- Bukidnon State University
