= Mawab =

Municipality in Davao de Oro, Philippines

- Municipality
- Municipality of Mawab
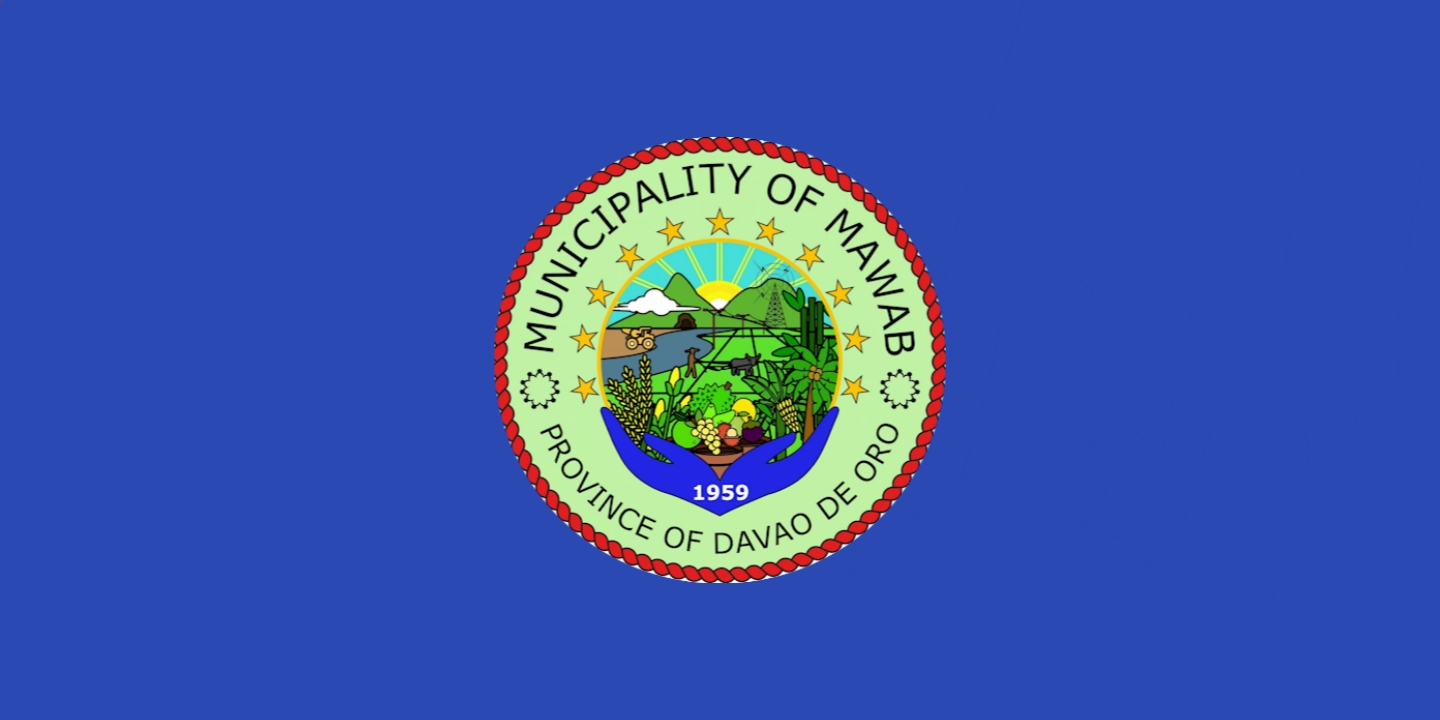
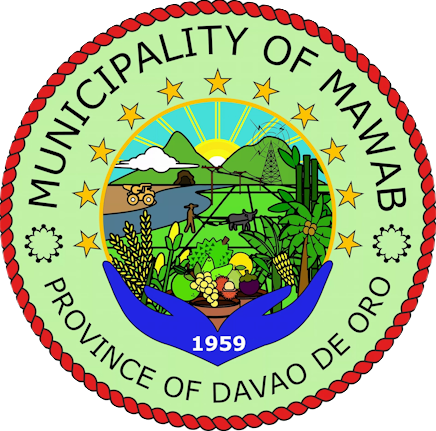
- Flag Seal
- Nickname: Bibingka Capital of Davao Region
- Map of Davao de Oro with Mawab highlighted
- Interactive map of Mawab
- Location within the Philippines
- Coordinates: 7°30′31″N 125°55′14″E
- Country: Philippines
- Region: Davao Region
- Province: Davao de Oro
- District: 2nd district
- Founded: August 14, 1959
- Barangays: 11 (see Barangays)

Government
  - Type: Sangguniang Bayan
  - Mayor: Myrill L. Apit
  - Vice Mayor: Ramil Medina
  - Representative: Leonel Ceniza
  - Electorate: 29,077 voters (2025)

Area
  - Total: 136.10 km^{2} (52.55 sq mi)
- Elevation: 126 m (413 ft)
- Highest elevation: 425 m (1,394 ft)
- Lowest elevation: 46 m (151 ft)

Population (2024 census)
  - Total: 41,050
  - Density: 301.6/km^{2} (781.2/sq mi)
  - Households: 9,546

Economy
  - Income class: 1st municipal income class
  - Poverty incidence: 14.47% (2023)
  - Revenue: ₱ 219.1 million (2024)
  - Assets: ₱ 392.4 million (2024)
  - Expenditure: ₱ 223.3 million (2024)
  - Liabilities: ₱ 125.4 million (2024)

Service provider
  - Electricity: Northern Davao Electric Cooperative (NORDECO)
- Time zone: UTC+8 (PST)
- ZIP code: 8802
- PSGC: 1108206000
- IDD : area code: +63 (0)87
- Native languages: Davawenyo; Cebuano; Kalagan; Mansaka; Tagalog; Ata Manobo
- Website: www.lgumawab.gov.ph

Mawab, officially the Municipality of Mawab (Cebuano: Lungsod sa Mawab; Tagalog: Bayan ng Mawab), is a municipality in the province of Davao de Oro, Philippines. According to the 2024 census, it has a population of 41,050 people, making it the least populated municipality in the province.

== History ==
Mawab was originally called 'Ma-awag' (wide valley) by the early tribal inhabitants. The municipality is traversed by four rivers: Hijo, Mawab, Galinan, and Gumawan. Its population includes several tribal groups, notably the Mansakas, Mandayas, and Dibabawons.

Mawab was organized into a municipality through Executive Order No. 351, issued by President Carlos P. Garcia on August 14, 1959. It consists of three barrios of Nabunturan, and three of Tagum, including Barrio Mawab which was designated as the seat of government, all then part of the old Davao province.

On May 8, 1967, following the division of Davao, Compostela became part of the new province of Davao del Norte. On March 7, 1998, the municipality became part of the new province of Compostela Valley (now Davao de Oro), when Republic Act No. 8470 was ratified through a plebiscite.

== Geography ==
Mawab is bounded by the municipalities of Nabunturan, Davao de Oro, in the north-west; Montevista, Davao de Oro, and New Bataan, Davao de Oro, in the north-east; Maragusan, Davao de Oro (San Mariano) in the southeast; Municipalities of Maco, Davao de Oro, municipality of Mabini, Davao de Oro, and municipality of Pantukan, Davao de Oro in the south-west.

The municipality of Mawab, known for its dense forests and rich tree cover, generally does not experience flooding during the rainy season, although landslides can occur in certain areas. Its river tributaries support seasonal agricultural and agro-industrial activities. Privately owned man-made fishponds for freshwater species also provide business opportunities for local entrepreneurs.

=== Barangays ===
Mawab is politically subdivided into 11 barangays. Each barangay consists of puroks while some have sitios.

- Andili
- Bawani
- Concepcion
- Malinawon
- Nueva Visayas
- Nuevo Iloco
- Poblacion
- Salvacion
- Saosao
- Sawangan
- Tuboran

=== Climate ===
Climate data for Mawab
Month	Jan	Feb	Mar	Apr	May	Jun	Jul	Aug	Sep	Oct	Nov	Dec	Year
Mean daily maximum °C (°F)	26 (79)	27 (81)	27 (81)	29 (84)	29 (84)	29 (84)	29 (84)	30 (86)	30 (86)	29 (84)	29 (84)	27 (81)	28 (83)
Mean daily minimum °C (°F)	23 (73)	23 (73)	22 (72)	23 (73)	24 (75)	24 (75)	23 (73)	23 (73)	24 (75)	24 (75)	23 (73)	23 (73)	23 (74)
Average precipitation mm (inches)	160 (6.3)	127 (5.0)	96 (3.8)	62 (2.4)	141 (5.6)	197 (7.8)	185 (7.3)	186 (7.3)	183 (7.2)	181 (7.1)	128 (5.0)	111 (4.4)	1,757 (69.2)
Average rainy days	20.0	17.2	15.9	13.9	23.8	27.2	28.1	28.2	27.0	27.0	21.3	18.7	268.3
Source: Meteoblue

The prevailing climatic conditions in the municipality are categorized into two (2) types:

- Wet season (Rainy Season or Monsoon Season)
- Dry Season (Summer Season)

== Demographics ==
Population census of Mawab
Year	Pop.	±% p.a.
1960	7,818	—
1970	13,537	+5.64%
1975	17,085	+4.78%
1980	20,960	+4.17%
1990	28,072	+2.97%
1995	29,878	+1.18%
2000	32,003	+1.48%
2007	34,656	+1.10%
2010	35,698	+1.08%
2015	37,065	+0.72%
2020	39,631	+1.42%
2024	41,050	+0.85%
Source: Philippine Statistics Authority

In the 2024 census, the population of Mawab was 41,050 people, with a density of 300 inhabitants per square kilometre or 780 inhabitants per square mile.

Ethnicity is varied and of mixed origin due to migration from different Major Islands: Luzon, Visayas, Mindanao.

Others are the 'Trival Group', 'Native Filipino' and some are of 'Chinese Ancestry': China. Those who immigrated from Mindanao Island, more specially from Zamboanga has 'Spanish Ancestry': Spain.

Majority of the populace are from two major islands of Visayas and Mindanao.

=== Languages and dialects ===
Languages spoken are products of migration of natives from different provinces of Visayas island, Mindanao island and some few in Luzon island.

- National Language - Tagalog (Vernacular language of the country).
- Regional Language - Cebuano (Visayas Island language).
- Tribal Languages - Mansaka: Mansakan language. Mandaya (Mandayan Language): Lumad people. Maranao.
- Provincial Languages - Hiligaynon (Ilongo), Ilokano language (Ilocano). Waray-Waray (Waray). Surigaonon language (Surigaynon) as well as Davawenyo language (Davao Region).

=== Religion ===
Religion in Mawab is predominantly Roman Catholic, Protestant, and some Muslims.

== Economy ==
Poverty incidence of Mawab (%)

Source: Philippine Statistics Authority

== Government ==
Elected officials 2019–Present:

- Mayor: Myrill L. Apit, MPA
- Vice Mayor: Engr. Ramil R. Medina
- SB MEMBERS :

1. SB Rolando "Daku" Millaran 2. SB Rolando "lalay" Espina 3. SB Bob Mirasol 4. SB Ruperto "Rupet" Gonzaga 5. SB Juris mae "pinky" J. Lumantas 6. SB Ernie Tan 7. SB Amadeo "Jojo" Esuerte 8. SB Ronero "Nero" Gonzaga 9. SB Datu Marjory Donato - IPMR 10. SB Danny Plazo - ABC president 11. SB Jenny Baring - SK Federation

== Education ==
Education in the Philippines is patterned from both of educational systems of Spain and the United States of America. However, after the liberation of the Philippines in 1946, Filipinos then had moved in various directions of its own. Elementary and high school education is compulsory, and is administered nationally by the Department of Education (Philippines), along with the assurance of funding for school services and equipment, recruitment of teachers for all public schools, and the supervising and organization of the education curricula. Based on the current education system of the Philippines, students should enter elementary schools at the age of 6 or 7, and for a duration of six years. Then, at the age of 12 or 13, students then enter high schools for a duration four years, with a total of ten years of compulsory 'Public Education'. All public and private elementary schools, high schools and colleges and universities in the Philippines start classes from early June to mid June and end from mid March to early April.

There are 'Summer Classes' in between (months of April to May) for college programs which is optional for students to take.

In elementary and secondary education, universities and colleges the vernacular language of the country, Filipino is part of educational curriculum. Spanish (Espanol) as well is part of the educational curriculum in universities as a compulsory subject (twenty one credits) to graduate and finish an educational degree or Bachelor of Science. The medium of instruction in the classrooms is in English, Filipino (Tagalog), and whatever regional dialect they have.

=== List of public and private schools ===
List of various public schools are all enlisted under Bureau of Secondary Education - Department of Education (DEP) Republic of the Philippines. For Mawab, Davao de Oro it is under Davao Region or Region 11 (Region 11): Department of Education (Philippines).
