= Laak, Davao de Oro =

Municipality in Davao de Oro, Philippines

Laak San Vicente
- Municipality
- Municipality of Laak
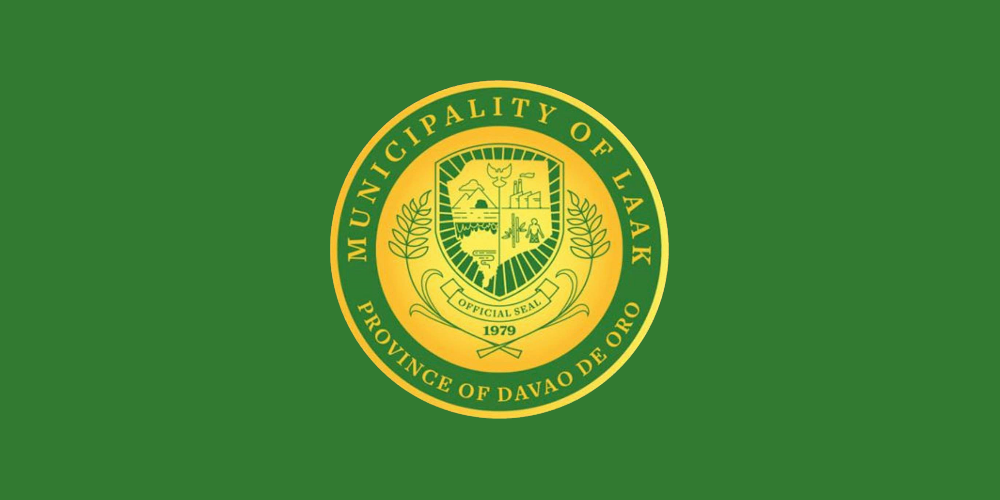
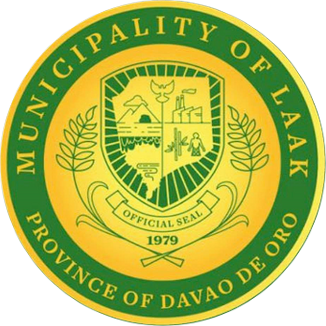
- Flag Seal
- Nickname: El Dorado's Last Frontier
- Map of Davao de Oro with Laak highlighted
- Interactive map of Laak
- Location within the Philippines
- Coordinates: 7°49′08″N 125°47′26″E
- Country: Philippines
- Region: Davao Region
- Province: Davao de Oro
- District: 2nd district
- Founded: April 4, 1979
- Renamed: May 28, 1994
- Barangays: 40 (see Barangays)

Government
  - Type: Sangguniang Bayan
  - Mayor: Mark Anthony "Honeyboy" S. Libuangan
  - Vice Mayor: Antonio "Ay-Eng" L. Libuangan
  - Representative: Leonel "Jhong" D. Ceniza
  - Electorate: 57,135 voters (2025)

Area
  - Total: 768.00 km^{2} (296.53 sq mi)
- Elevation: 174 m (571 ft)
- Highest elevation: 375 m (1,230 ft)
- Lowest elevation: 91 m (299 ft)

Population (2024 census)
  - Total: 83,632
  - Density: 108.90/km^{2} (282.04/sq mi)
  - Households: 19,888

Economy
  - Income class: 1st municipal income class
  - Poverty incidence: 22.23% (2023)
  - Revenue: ₱ 464.1 million (2024)
  - Assets: ₱ 1,361 million (2024)
  - Expenditure: ₱ 503.3 million (2024)
  - Liabilities: ₱ 371.2 million (2024)

Service provider
  - Electricity: Northern Davao Electric Cooperative (NORDECO)
- Time zone: UTC+8 (PST)
- ZIP code: 8810
- PSGC: 1108202000
- IDD : area code: +63 (0)87
- Native languages: Davawenyo; Cebuano; Kalagan; Mansaka; Tagalog; Ata Manobo
- Major religions: Christianity
- Website: www.laak.gov.ph

Laak, officially the Municipality of Laak (Cebuano: Lungsod sa Laak; Filipino: Bayan ng Laak), is a municipality in the province of Davao de Oro, Philippines. According to the 2024 census, it has a population of 83,632 people.

== Etymology ==
The original name that the pioneer residents used to call this place even before the very formation of its nucleus in 1965 is no other than the native name Laak, derived from the name of a small thorn less bamboo. It is similar to but smaller than the bamboo called Lunas by the Bisayan tribes.

Previously, the municipality was named San Vicente. The prefix "San" was attached to Vicente, after Vicente Romualdez, the father of Imelda Marcos, who was the First Lady of the Philippines when the municipality was established. Coincidentally, the law creating the town was approved on the eve of the feast day of Saint Vincent Ferrer.

== History ==
The town of Laak was founded on April 4, 1979, as San Vicente from several barangays of Monkayo, Montevista and Asuncion. Laak was created into a municipality of the province of Davao del Norte by virtue of Batas Pambansa Bilang 23. It was made part of the newly made province of Compostela Valley (now Davao de Oro) in 1998.

The name Laak, however, was not adopted when this place was created into a municipality. The name San Vicente was instantly coined just to ensure the passage of the law creating this place into a town.

As the town residents found no meaning in calling this place San Vicente, they unanimously approved during the plebiscite called for the purpose on May 28, 1994, the adoption of the name Laak. Mayor Reynaldo B. Navarro, and the Sangguniang Bayan Members at that time led the move for the change of the name pursuant to the desire of the people.

== Geography ==
Laak, although it has an overall population of 70,856 in per census of 2010, is very isolated from other populated towns in its vicinity such as Monkayo and Nabunturan. The main cause of this is of its being a predominantly agricultural town; there are also some factors which contribute to its isolation such as its huge land area of 947.06 square kilometers (365.66 sq mi) and its heavily forested geographical features.

The municipality borders the following towns: Kapalong, Davao del Norte to the west; Loreto and Veruela, Agusan del Sur to the north and northeast; Montevista and Monkayo, Davao de Oro to the east and southeast; and Sawata, Davao del Norte to the southwest.

=== Barangays ===
Laak is politically subdivided into 40 barangays. Each barangay consists of puroks while some have sitios.

- Aguinaldo
- Amorcruz
- Ampawid
- Andap
- Anitap
- Bagong Silang
- Banbanon
- Belmonte
- Binasbas
- Bullucan
- Ceboleda
- Concepcion
- Datu Ampunan
- Datu Davao
- Doña Josefa
- El Katipunan
- Il Papa
- Imelda
- Inakayan
- Kaligutan
- Kapatagan
- Kidawa
- Kilagding
- Kiokmay
- Laak (Poblacion)
- Langtud
- Longanapan
- Mabuhay
- Macopa
- Malinao
- Mangloy
- Melale
- Naga
- New Bethlehem
- Panamoren
- Sabud
- San Antonio
- Sta Emilia
- Sto Niño
- Sisimon

=== Climate ===
Climate data for Laak
Month	Jan	Feb	Mar	Apr	May	Jun	Jul	Aug	Sep	Oct	Nov	Dec	Year
Mean daily maximum °C (°F)	26 (79)	26 (79)	27 (81)	29 (84)	29 (84)	29 (84)	29 (84)	30 (86)	30 (86)	29 (84)	28 (82)	27 (81)	28 (83)
Mean daily minimum °C (°F)	22 (72)	22 (72)	22 (72)	22 (72)	23 (73)	23 (73)	22 (72)	22 (72)	22 (72)	22 (72)	22 (72)	22 (72)	22 (72)
Average precipitation mm (inches)	123 (4.8)	92 (3.6)	56 (2.2)	29 (1.1)	38 (1.5)	57 (2.2)	52 (2.0)	52 (2.0)	52 (2.0)	59 (2.3)	50 (2.0)	74 (2.9)	734 (28.6)
Average rainy days	20.2	17.6	16.5	11.7	17.0	20.2	20.9	28.7	19.8	21.5	16.8	17.6	228.5
Source: Meteoblue

== Demographics ==
Population census of Laak
Year	Pop.	±% p.a.
1980	31,581	—
1990	35,895	+1.29%
1995	51,073	+6.83%
2000	59,450	+3.31%
2007	66,607	+1.58%
2010	70,856	+2.28%
2015	73,874	+0.80%
2020	79,744	+1.62%
2024	83,632	+1.15%
Source: Philippine Statistics Authority

In the 2024 census, the population of Laak was 83,632 people, with a density of 110 inhabitants per square kilometre or 280 inhabitants per square mile.

== Economy ==
Poverty incidence of Laak (%)

Source: Philippine Statistics Authority

Laak's economy is primarily driven by agriculture, with almost 65% of its income coming from agricultural sector (it includes agro-forestry, inland fishery and livestock raising) and business enterprises contribute only 35% of the municipality's income.

== Transportation ==
The town of Laak is accessible by bus, passenger jeeps, and habal-habal motorcycles from both Tagum City and Trento, Agusan del Sur. Most passenger vehicles going to Laak had to pass the Tagum-Asuncion-San Isidro-Laak road since this road is one of the only two transportation accesses to the town, the other one being Loreto-Veruela-Trento road; the town does not have roads connecting to other towns of Davao de Oro, such as Nabunturan and Monkayo.

== See also ==
- List of renamed cities and municipalities in the Philippines
