= New Corella =

Municipality in Davao del Norte, Philippines

- Municipality
- Municipality of New Corella
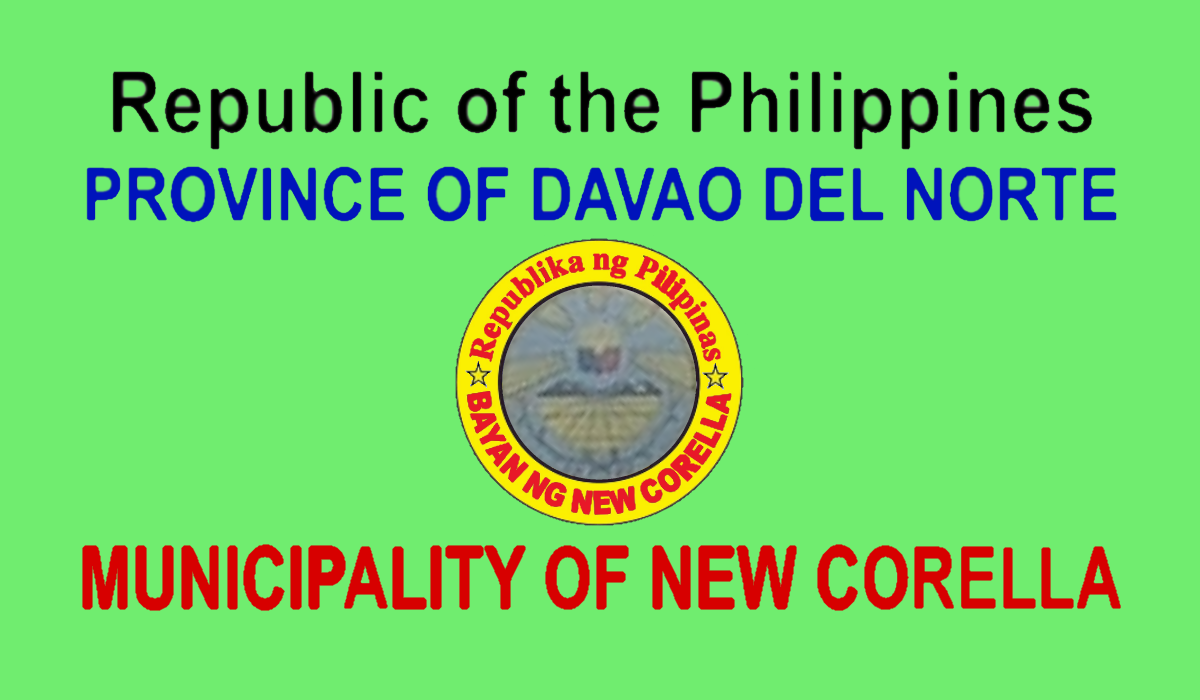
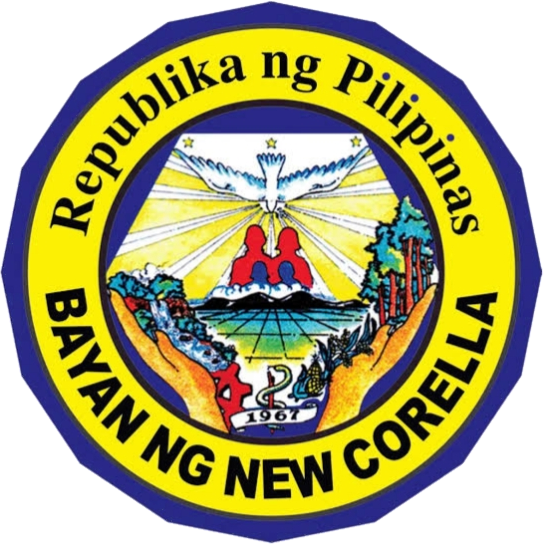
- Flag Seal
- Motto: Lambo Pamilya, Uswag New Corella!
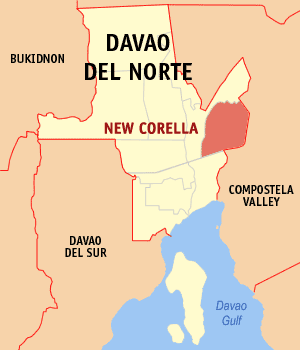
- Map of Davao del Norte with New Corella highlighted
- Interactive map of New Corella
- Location within the Philippines
- Coordinates: 7°35′12″N 125°49′25″E
- Country: Philippines
- Region: Davao Region
- Province: Davao del Norte
- District: 1st district
- Founded: June 18, 1966
- Barangays: 20 (see Barangays)

Government
  - Type: Sangguniang Bayan
  - Mayor: Jorjan B. Federiso
  - Vice Mayor: Pedro H. Lagumbay Jr.
  - Representative: De Carlo "Oyo" L. Uy
  - Municipal Council: Members: Alvin A. Libres; Joann B. Federiso; Virgilio G. Acasio; Consaro S. Sayon; Rodolfo O. Comidoy; Edwin B. Tambis; Carlito C. Maligro, Jr.; Rhodora S. Alcoran
  - Electorate: 38,200 voters (2025)

Area
  - Total: 263.12 km^{2} (101.59 sq mi)
- Elevation: 43 m (141 ft)
- Highest elevation: 292 m (958 ft)
- Lowest elevation: 15 m (49 ft)

Population (2024 census)
  - Total: 60,454
  - Density: 229.76/km^{2} (595.07/sq mi)
  - Households: 13,958

Economy
  - Income class: 1st municipal income class
  - Poverty incidence: 34.68% (2023)
  - Revenue: ₱ 309.6 million (2024)
  - Assets: ₱ 624.9 million (2024)
  - Expenditure: ₱ 285.2 million (2024)
  - Liabilities: ₱ 123.5 million (2024)

Service provider
  - Electricity: Northern Davao Electric Cooperative (NORDECO)
- Time zone: UTC+8 (PST)
- ZIP code: 8104
- PSGC: 1102314000
- IDD : area code: +63 (0)84
- Native languages: Davawenyo; Cebuano; Ata Manobo; Kalagan; Tagalog
- Website: www.newcorella.gov.ph

New Corella, officially the Municipality of New Corella (Cebuano: Lungsod sa Bag-ong Corella; Tagalog: Bayan ng Bagong Corella), is a municipality in the province of Davao del Norte, Philippines. According to the 2024 census, it has a population of 60,454 people.

== History ==
New Corella was named after the town of Corella, Bohol, which is where the migrants came from who came to settle in what is now Barangay Poblacion. The municipality was established on June 18, 1966 by carving the eastern part of the town of Asuncion.

== Geography ==
=== Climate ===
its very init

Climate data for New Corella, Davao del Norte
| Month | Jan | Feb | Mar | Apr | May | Jun | Jul | Aug | Sep | Oct | Nov | Dec | Year |
|---|---|---|---|---|---|---|---|---|---|---|---|---|---|
| Mean daily maximum °C (°F) | 28 (82) | 28 (82) | 29 (84) | 31 (88) | 31 (88) | 30 (86) | 30 (86) | 31 (88) | 31 (88) | 31 (88) | 30 (86) | 29 (84) | 30 (86) |
| Mean daily minimum °C (°F) | 22 (72) | 22 (72) | 22 (72) | 22 (72) | 23 (73) | 24 (75) | 23 (73) | 23 (73) | 23 (73) | 23 (73) | 23 (73) | 23 (73) | 23 (73) |
| Average precipitation mm (inches) | 63 (2.5) | 50 (2.0) | 35 (1.4) | 22 (0.9) | 47 (1.9) | 68 (2.7) | 51 (2.0) | 53 (2.1) | 49 (1.9) | 47 (1.9) | 39 (1.5) | 38 (1.5) | 562 (22.3) |
| Average rainy days | 15.0 | 12.6 | 10.4 | 8.2 | 18.8 | 22.5 | 21.2 | 20.5 | 20.3 | 20.3 | 14.4 | 11.7 | 195.9 |
Source: Meteoblue

=== Barangays ===
New Corella is politically subdivided into 20 barangays. Each barangay consists of puroks while some have sitios.

- Cabidianan
- Carcor
- Del Monte
- Del Pilar
- El Salvador
- Limba-an
- Macgum
- Mambing
- Mesaoy
- New Bohol
- New Cortez
- New Sambog
- Patrocenio
- Poblacion
- San Roque
- Sta. Cruz
- Sta. Fe
- Sto. Niño
- Suawon
- San Jose

== Demographics ==
Population census of New Corella
| Year | Pop. | ±% p.a. |
|---|---|---|
| 1970 | 18,745 | — |
| 1975 | 26,809 | +7.44% |
| 1980 | 24,926 | −1.45% |
| 1990 | 36,138 | +3.78% |
| 1995 | 41,615 | +2.68% |
| 2000 | 44,590 | +1.49% |
| 2007 | 46,311 | +0.52% |
| 2010 | 50,699 | +3.35% |
| 2015 | 54,844 | +1.51% |
| 2020 | 57,913 | +1.15% |
| 2024 | 60,454 | +1.04% |
Source: Philippine Statistics Authority

== Economy ==
Poverty incidence of New Corella (%)

Source: Philippine Statistics Authority
