= Sawata, Davao del Norte =

Municipality in Davao del Norte, Philippines

Sawata San Isidro
- Municipality
- Municipality of Sawata
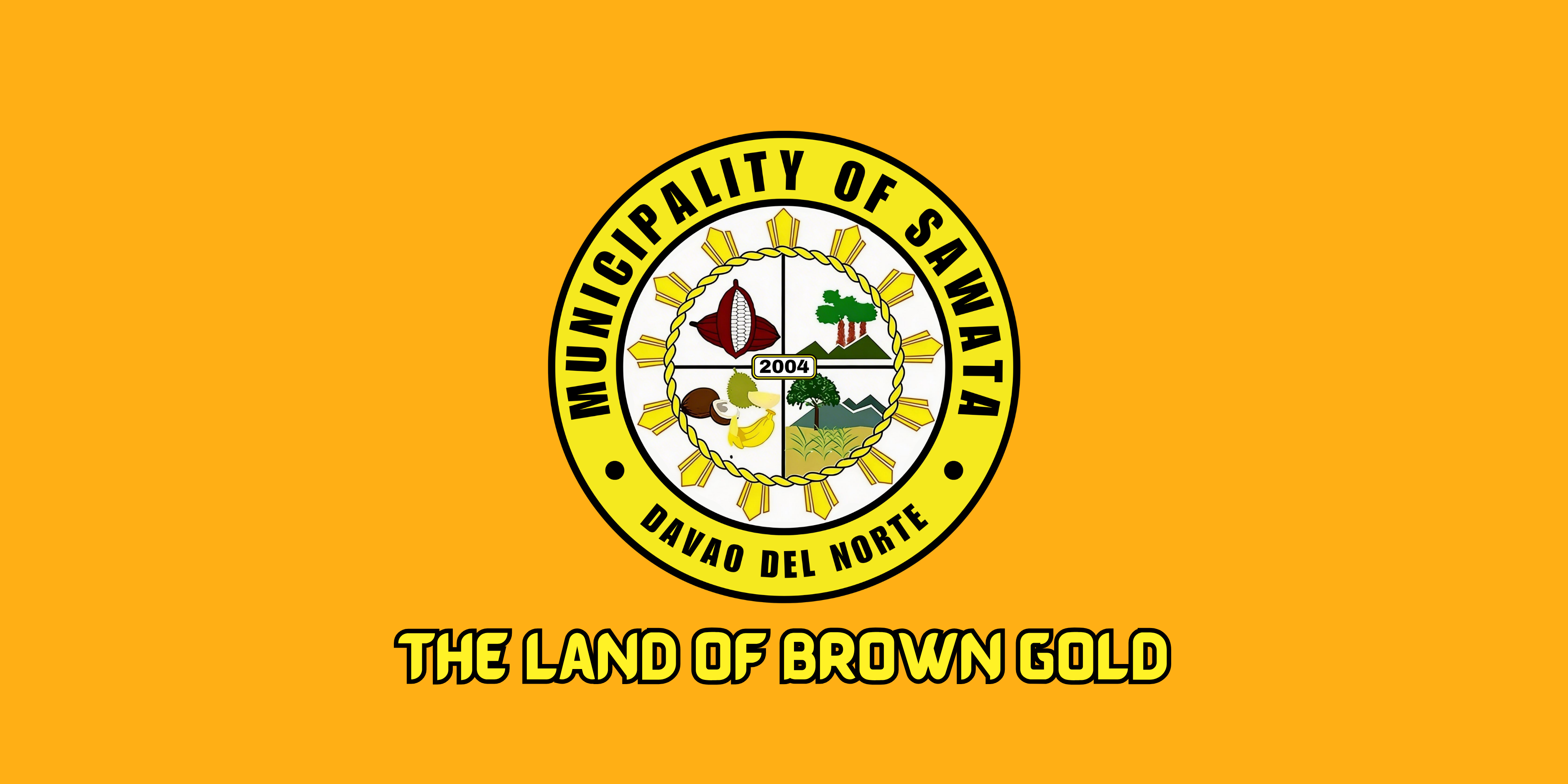
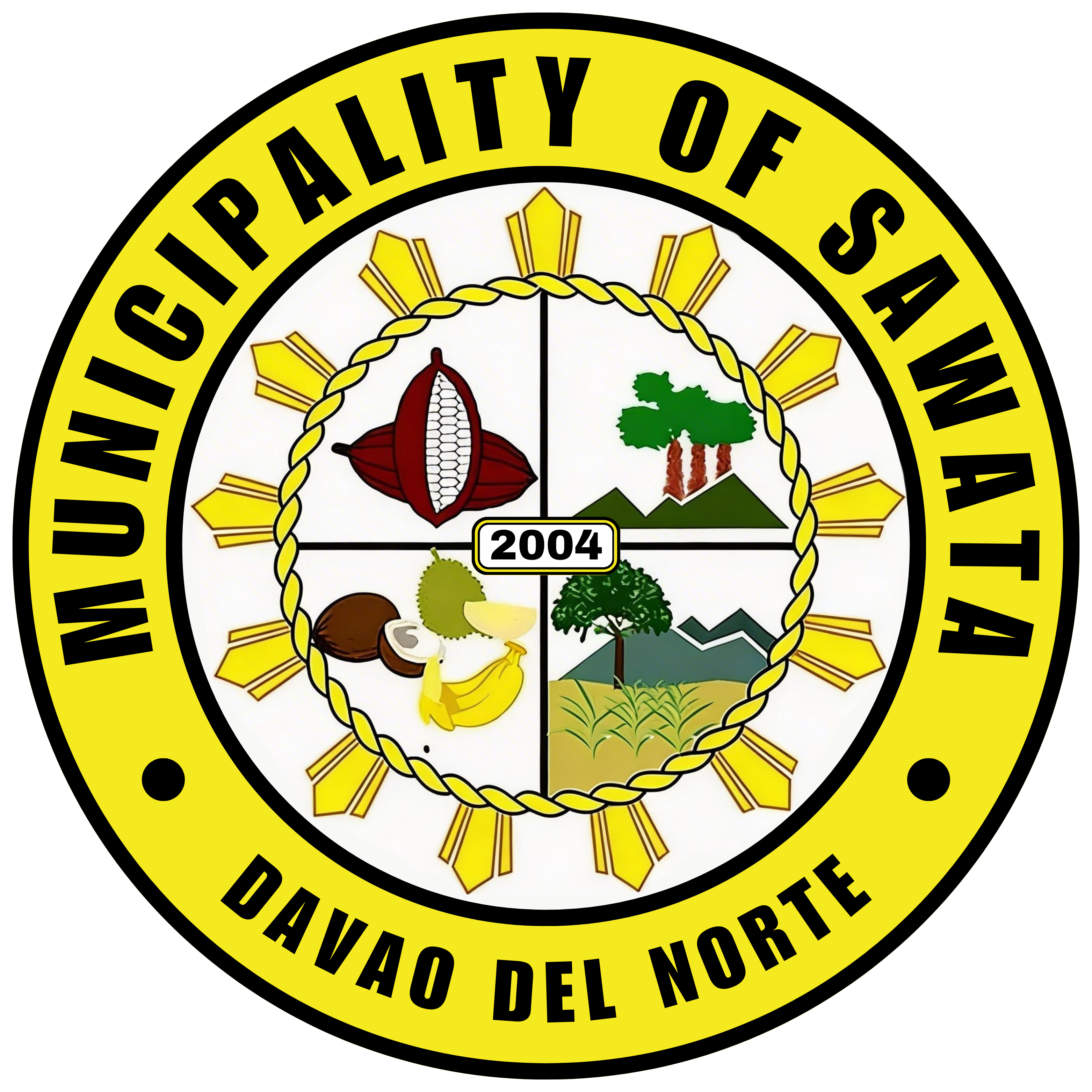
- Flag Seal

- Map of Davao del Norte with Sawata highlighted
- Interactive map of Sawata
- Location within the Philippines
- Coordinates: 7.74765°N 125.72785°E
- Country: Philippines
- Region: Davao Region
- Province: Davao del Norte
- District: 1st district
- Founded: June 26, 2004
- Renamed: April 11, 2026
- Barangays: 13 (see Barangays)

Government
  - Type: Sangguniang Bayan
  - Mayor: Silvano "Papa Banot" Gaje
  - Vice Mayor: Jacinissa "Dagdag" Cafe-Binasbas
  - Representative: De Carlo "Oyo" Uy
  - Municipal Council: Members: Daisy Llevado; Baltazar "Balty" Cuyos; Alliah "Yang" Dela Rama; Kap Maret Biernes; Roselyn "Rose" Cuestas; Lolito Salazar; Jaylen Gaje; Celoy Lamsin
  - Electorate: 20,363 voters (2025)

Area
  - Total: 152.49 km^{2} (58.88 sq mi)
- Elevation: 7.0 m (23.0 ft)
- Highest elevation: 27 m (89 ft)
- Lowest elevation: −1 m (−3.3 ft)

Population (2024 census)
  - Total: 27,552
  - Density: 180.68/km^{2} (467.96/sq mi)
  - Households: 6,571
- Demonym: Sawateño/a

Economy
  - Income class: 3rd municipal income class
  - Poverty incidence: 22.81% (2023)
  - Revenue: ₱ 165.4 million (2024)
  - Assets: ₱ 276.3 million (2024)
  - Expenditure: ₱ 182.8 million (2024)
  - Liabilities: ₱ 86.42 million (2024)

Service provider
  - Electricity: Northern Davao Electric Cooperative (NORDECO)
  - Water: Sawata Water District
- Time zone: UTC+8 (PST)
- ZIP code: 8121
- PSGC: 1102324000
- IDD : area code: +63 (0)84
- Native languages: Davawenyo; Cebuano; Ata Manobo; Kalagan; Tagalog
- Major religions: Christianity
- Patron saint: Isidore the Laborer

Sawata, officially the Municipality of Sawata (Cebuano: Lungsod sa Sawata; Tagalog: Bayan ng Sawata) and formerly known as San Isidro, is a municipality in the province of Davao del Norte, Philippines. According to the 2024 census, it has a population of 27,552 people, making it the least populated municipality in the province.

== History ==
=== Formation of the municipality ===
Republic Act No. 9265 was signed by then-President Gloria Macapagal Arroyo on March 15, 2004. A plebiscite was administered and approved by the electorate of Asuncion and Kapalong on June 26, 2004. Under the name San Isidro, the newly chartered municipality absorbed six barangays from the municipality of Asuncion, namely: Sawata, Sabangan, Mamangan, Santo Niño, Igangon, and Kipalili; and seven barangays from the municipality of Kapalong, namely: Dacudao, Datu Balong, Libuton, Pinamuno, Monte Dujali, Linao, and San Miguel.

=== Renaming of the municipality ===
Davao del Norte 1st district representative and former House speaker Pantaleon Alvarez filed House Bill No. 9452, renaming the municipality to Sawata. It passed on third and final reading by the House on August 3, 2021, and on the Senate on January 31, 2022.

On June 2, 2022, Republic Act No. 11814, the act renaming San Isidro as Sawata, as well as its municipal proper, Barangay Sawata as Poblacion, lapsed into law without the then outgoing President Rodrigo Duterte's signature. On March 4, 2026, the Commission on Elections (COMELEC) issued Resolution No. 11202, setting the plebiscite on April 11, 2026.

The plebiscite was successfully administered on April 11, 2026, despite a low turnout of close to 40% of the registered electorate of the municipality. Later, on that day, the COMELEC announced the ratification of these proposals by majority of participated voters.

Results of 2026 plebiscites for the renaming of local divisions
| Old name | Proposed new name | Choice | | | | Valid votes | | Invalid votes | | Total votes | Turnout (%) | Registered voters |
| Old name | Proposed new name | Yes | | No | | Valid votes | | Invalid votes | | Total votes | Turnout (%) | Registered voters |
| Old name | Proposed new name | Votes | % | Votes | % | Votes | % | Votes | % | Total votes | Turnout (%) | Registered voters |
|---|---|---|---|---|---|---|---|---|---|---|---|---|
| Municipality of San Isidro | Municipality of Sawata | 7,555 | 98.94% | 81 | 1.06% | 7,636 | 99.63% | 28 | 0.37% | 7,664 | 36.55% | 20,970 |
| Barangay Sawata | Barangay Poblacion | 1,226 | 98.32% | 21 | 1.68% | 1,247 | 99.52% | 6 | 0.48% | 1,253 | 38.07% | 3,291 |
Sources: COMELEC, via SunStar.

== Geography ==
Located in Davao del Norte, Sawata shares its borders with the municipalities of Kapalong and Asuncion. Additionally, it also borders the province of Davao de Oro, specifically the municipality of Laak.

=== Climate ===
Climate data for Sawata, Davao del Norte
| Month | Jan | Feb | Mar | Apr | May | Jun | Jul | Aug | Sep | Oct | Nov | Dec | Year |
|---|---|---|---|---|---|---|---|---|---|---|---|---|---|
| Mean daily maximum °C (°F) | 27 (81) | 27 (81) | 29 (84) | 30 (86) | 30 (86) | 30 (86) | 30 (86) | 30 (86) | 30 (86) | 30 (86) | 29 (84) | 28 (82) | 29 (85) |
| Mean daily minimum °C (°F) | 22 (72) | 21 (70) | 21 (70) | 22 (72) | 23 (73) | 23 (73) | 23 (73) | 23 (73) | 23 (73) | 23 (73) | 22 (72) | 22 (72) | 22 (72) |
| Average precipitation mm (inches) | 63 (2.5) | 50 (2.0) | 35 (1.4) | 22 (0.9) | 47 (1.9) | 68 (2.7) | 51 (2.0) | 53 (2.1) | 49 (1.9) | 47 (1.9) | 39 (1.5) | 38 (1.5) | 562 (22.3) |
| Average rainy days | 15.0 | 12.6 | 10.4 | 8.2 | 18.8 | 22.5 | 21.2 | 20.5 | 20.3 | 20.3 | 14.4 | 11.7 | 195.9 |
Source: Meteoblue

=== Barangays ===
Sawata is politically subdivided into 13 barangays. Each barangay consists of puroks while some have sitios.

- Dacudao
- Datu Balong
- Igangon
- Kipalili
- Libuton
- Linao
- Mamangan
- Monte Dujali (Mandalingan)
- Pinamuno
- Poblacion (Sawata Proper)
- Sabangan
- San Miguel
- Santo Niño (Adecor)

== Demographics ==
Population census of Sawata
| Year | Pop. | ±% p.a. |
|---|---|---|
| 2007 | 24,696 | — |
| 2010 | 25,548 | +1.24% |
| 2015 | 26,651 | +0.81% |
| 2020 | 27,233 | +0.46% |
| 2024 | 27,552 | +0.28% |
Source: Philippine Statistics Authority

== Economy ==
Poverty incidence of Sawata (%)

Source: Philippine Statistics Authority

Sawata's main source of economy is agriculture; as cacao is its main plant. Its main product is sikwate (Visayan term for chocolate drink) which is made from tablea. Hence, the municipality is known as the "Chocolate Hub" of Davao del Norte; with Sikwate Festival being held in October of every year.

Sawata, among other areas, is reportedly the largest contributor of cacao beans in Davao Region with 4,000-hectare cacao farms. These make up an industry that, by 2006, yielded an estimated 3,600 metric tons of cacao beans per hectare annually. In 2012, more than half of farms were destroyed by super typhoon Pablo, causing sudden decline of tablea production. In the municipality's first founding anniversary, the largest tablea with the diameter of 2.5 meters and weighing 500 kilograms, was featured.

Sikwate is produced mainly by the Chocolate de San Isidro (CSI), a private entity. CSI has been making tablea since it started in 2009. In 2016, production of tablea began to increase through mechanized production. As of 2018, 120 kilograms of tablea were being produced daily; and up to 3 tons were being shipped monthly to other parts of the country. Likewise, sikwate is being exported.

Moreover, despite being equipped with the basic market facilities, Sawata's proximity from the provincial center makes the development still ongoing.

== Tourism ==
Sawata is known mainly for caves. Tourism destinations include the Cugsing and Kabyawan caves and Tugtugan Falls in Barangay Dacudao; as well as Maltag Falls at Datu Balong.
