= Compostela, Davao de Oro =

Municipality in Davao de Oro, Philippines

Compostela
- Municipality
- Municipality of Compostela
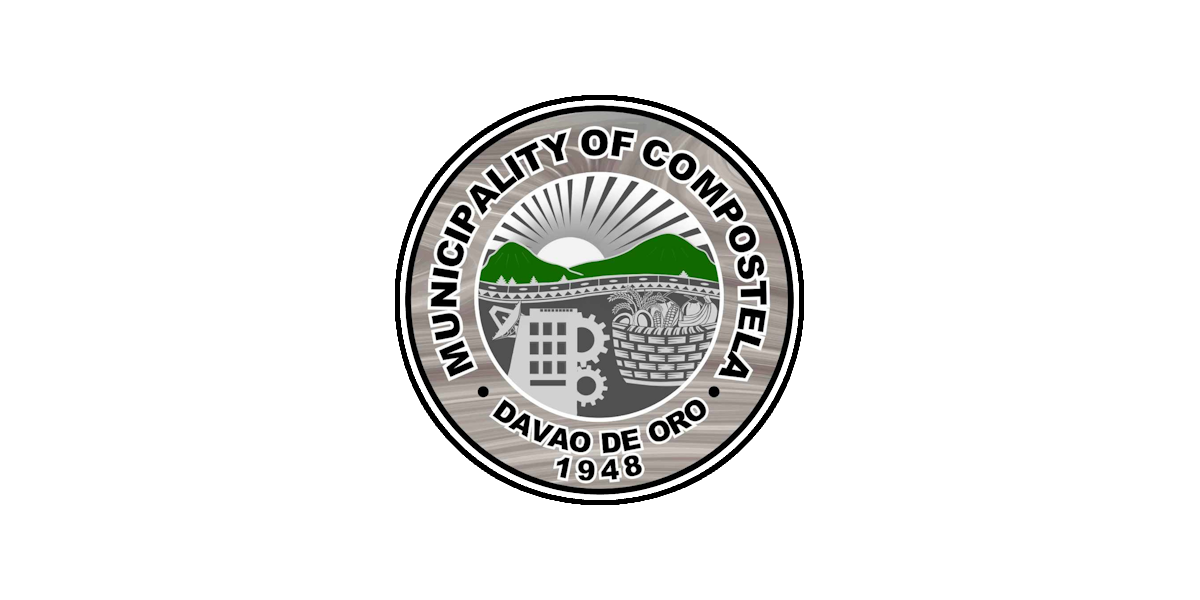
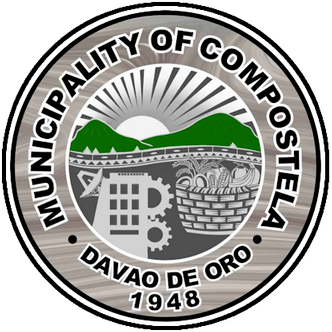
- Flag Seal
- Etymology: Campus Stellae (i.e., "field of the stars")
- Map of Davao de Oro with Compostela highlighted
- Interactive map of Compostela
- Location within the Philippines
- Coordinates: 7°40′N 126°05′E
- Country: Philippines
- Region: Davao Region
- Province: Davao de Oro
- District: 1st district
- Founded: August 1, 1948
- Barangays: 16 (see Barangays)

Government
  - Type: Sangguniang Bayan
  - Mayor: Levi S. Ebdao
  - Vice Mayor: Ricky Hechanova
  - Representative: Maricar Zamora
  - Electorate: 61,803 voters (2025)

Area
  - Total: 287.00 km^{2} (110.81 sq mi)
- Elevation: 84 m (276 ft)
- Highest elevation: 465 m (1,526 ft)
- Lowest elevation: 64 m (210 ft)

Population (2024 census)
  - Total: 89,224
  - Density: 310.89/km^{2} (805.19/sq mi)
  - Households: 21,606
- Demonym(s): Compostelano; Compostelana

Economy
  - Income class: 1st municipal income class
  - Poverty incidence: 15.55% (2023)
  - Revenue: ₱ 426.8 million (2024)
  - Assets: ₱ 1,506 million (2024)
  - Expenditure: ₱ 416.8 million (2024)
  - Liabilities: ₱ 199 million (2024)

Service Provider
  - Electricity: Northern Davao Electric Cooperative (NORDECO)
- Time zone: UTC+8 (PST)
- ZIP code: 8803
- PSGC: 1108201000
- IDD : area code: +63 (0)87
- Native languages: Davawenyo; Cebuano; Kalagan; Mansaka; Ata Manobo; Tagalog
- Website: www.compostela.gov.ph

Compostela, officially the Municipality of Compostela (Cebuano: Lungsod sa Compostela; Tagalog: Bayan ng Compostela), is a municipality in the province of Davao de Oro, Philippines. According to the 2024 census, it has a population of 89,224 people.

== Etymology ==
There are no documented records explaining the origin of the name Compostela. According to local folklore, the area was once a temporary Spanish settlement, a Campo de Castila (literally, "Field of Spaniards") populated by Spaniards from what is now Davao Oriental. Another legend holds that a Spanish friar from the eastern coasts of Mindanao came to the place, bringing with him a statue of Saint James the Apostle, patron of his native Santiago de Compostela in Spain. The priest then christened the region after his own birthplace..

== History ==
Compostela is one of several towns sitting on the vast plains of Davao de Oro. Its development started before World War II, when the area was still a forest and the only inhabitants were indigenous Mandayas who chose to settle along the Agusan River.

Before the outbreak of World War II, the area in what is now the province to which the town of Compostela currently belongs was one of the Bureau of Non-Christian Tribes for Mindanao. Its office was based at Dansalan, Lanao under the directorship of Teofisto Guingona, Sr., who was then exercising government control over provinces and municipal districts of Mindanao. However, the bureau was abolished right after the war. The valley was then formed into Compostela-Monkayo Districts and subdivided into three small districts: Monkayo, Compostela and Camansa. Compostela was governed by Mr. Bonifacio Garcia as the District Mayor appointed by the Governor of Davao which during that time was still one province with the capital at Davao City. Local government functions were performed by the governor and the district mayors were only ceremonial leaders.

Road construction of the Davao-Agusan National Highway extended up to Camp Kalaw, a Philippine Constabulary detachment located at what is now the town of Monkayo. Compostela Proper, then the popular name of Compostela, was accessible via Agusan River with embarkation at Kilometer 106 (now Barangay Bankerohan Sur of Montevista). Settlers from Luzon and the Visayas started to settle in Compostela, lured by the promise of vast agricultural lands so fertile and rich if you are determined and able-bodied. That was in 1939 and some of those who came to settle in Compostela to tame the wilderness are the Garcia's of Talibon, Bohol; the Galenzoga's of Baybay, Leyte; the Maquilan's of Mandawe, Cebu; the Regaña's of Samar; the Estrada's of Luzon and the Bayubay's of Ilocos. These pioneers lived in harmony with the native Mandayas; among them were the Blanco's, the Manzanares', the Braose's, the Adao's and the Fabian's. The third generation of both these pioneers and natives is still in Compostela today.

When World War II in the country broke out in 1942, most of the people evacuated to hinterlands of the valley leaving their farms behind. Also at this time, the Philippine Civil Assistance Unit (PCAU) established a civil government at Kilometer 90, now Nabunturan, and installed Juanito Regaña as the Municipal District Mayor of Compostela.

After the war in 1945, the people came back to their farms which now became a virtual forest. Those who came back again tilled the soil and settled permanently in the place. Also during these times, Governor Antonio Lanzar appointed Mr. Formoso Piansay as Municipal District Mayor of Compostela.

On August 1, 1948, an Executive Order No. 156 was signed by then President Elpidio Quirino, organizing into four regular municipalities under the names of Compostela, New Leyte, Gov. Generoso and Trinidad, and the Municipal Districts of Compostela, Moncayo, Saug, Camansa, Surup, Sigaboy, Batulaki and Caburan, all in the Province of Davao, was soon made defunct and were either made, or joined, into regular municipalities.

In 1949, all municipal districts were abolished thus paving a way for the creation of new municipalities and Compostela with the seat of government at Km. 90 became a regular municipality with Mayor Lauro Arabejo as the appointed mayor. Compostela Proper then was only a barrio of the original Compostela municipality. It is accessible by boat powered by outboard motors that ply from Compostela Proper to Km. 106 via Agusan River. From Km. 106, people go to the government center at km. 90 Nabunturan by hiking or riding.

Then in the early 1950s, road construction going to Compostela Proper started via Km. 102 which is now Montevista. One of the engineers of the Bureau of Public Highways was Prospero S. Amatong.

In 1955, barrio New Sabonga was transferred to this town from Asuncion.

On May 8, 1967, following the division of Davao, Compostela became part of the new province of Davao del Norte.

On June 23, 1957, then President Carlos P. Garcia signed Republic Act No. 2038 which separated Nabunturan from Compostela. The first Mayor appointed by President Carlos P. Garcia was then Mayor Pio P. Galenzoga, one of the pioneer settlers. In the same year the sitios of Kao, Magkagong, Margosan, Matilo, Magangit, Cabacungan, Tigbatinao and Camanlangan were constituted into a barrio known as Santo Niño. At the time, Compostela was an incongruous mixture of wooden-roofed houses concentrated along the Agusan River which was properly known as "dungguanan" (embarkation). This area later became its center of trade and commerce or Poblacion.

On March 7, 1998, Compostela became part of the new province of Compostela Valley (now Davao de Oro), when Republic Act No. 8470 was ratified through a plebiscite.

== Geography ==
=== Barangays ===
Compostela is politically subdivided into 16 barangays. Each barangay consists of puroks while some have sitios.

- Bagongon
- Gabi
- Lagab
- Mangayon
- Mapaca
- Maparat
- New Alegria
- Ngan
- Osmeña
- Panansalan
- Poblacion
- San Jose
- San Miguel
- Siocon
- Tamia
- Aurora

=== Climate ===
Climate data for Compostela
| Month | Jan | Feb | Mar | Apr | May | Jun | Jul | Aug | Sep | Oct | Nov | Dec | Year |
|---|---|---|---|---|---|---|---|---|---|---|---|---|---|
| Mean daily maximum °C (°F) | 27 (81) | 27 (81) | 28 (82) | 29 (84) | 30 (86) | 29 (84) | 29 (84) | 30 (86) | 30 (86) | 30 (86) | 29 (84) | 28 (82) | 29 (84) |
| Mean daily minimum °C (°F) | 23 (73) | 23 (73) | 23 (73) | 23 (73) | 24 (75) | 24 (75) | 24 (75) | 24 (75) | 24 (75) | 24 (75) | 24 (75) | 23 (73) | 24 (74) |
| Average precipitation mm (inches) | 160 (6.3) | 127 (5.0) | 96 (3.8) | 62 (2.4) | 141 (5.6) | 197 (7.8) | 185 (7.3) | 186 (7.3) | 183 (7.2) | 181 (7.1) | 128 (5.0) | 111 (4.4) | 1,757 (69.2) |
| Average rainy days | 20.0 | 17.2 | 15.9 | 13.9 | 23.8 | 27.2 | 28.1 | 28.2 | 27.0 | 27.0 | 21.3 | 18.7 | 268.3 |
Source: Meteoblue (modeled/calculated data, not measured locally)

== Demographics ==
Population census of Compostela
| Year | Pop. | ±% p.a. |
|---|---|---|
| 1939 | 2,716 | — |
| 1948 | 9,649 | +15.13% |
| 1960 | 20,444 | +6.46% |
| 1970 | 17,159 | −1.73% |
| 1975 | 23,084 | +6.13% |
| 1980 | 30,538 | +5.75% |
| 1990 | 53,546 | +5.78% |
| 1995 | 55,030 | +0.51% |
| 2000 | 61,667 | +2.47% |
| 2007 | 69,849 | +1.73% |
| 2010 | 81,934 | +5.98% |
| 2015 | 87,474 | +1.25% |
| 2020 | 89,884 | +0.57% |
| 2024 | 89,224 | −0.18% |
Source: Philippine Statistics Authority

In the 2024 census, the population of Compostela was 89,224 people, with a density of 310 inhabitants per square kilometre or 800 inhabitants per square mile.

=== Population ===
The first record of municipality's population enumerated in census was in 1939 with a total population of 2,716. Compostela then was still a municipal district composed of municipalities of the district.

By virtue of Executive Order 156 issued by President Elpidio Quirino, Compostela officially became a municipality on August 1, 1948.

In 1960, the municipality's recorded population was 20,444. This was attributed to the fact that the municipality started to emerge and the influx of settlers from all over the country flocked to the municipality owing to its vast land. Another factor that contributed to this population was the logging operation of Valderrama Lumber Manufacturers Co., Incorporated.

In 1970, the population of the town declined by -3,285 or -16.07 percent. This was attributed by the creation of the Municipality of New Bataan into a municipality taken from Compostela in 1966.

Apparently, the biggest increase in population of the municipality was in 1990 with a registered population of 53,546. There was an increase of 23,008 or 75.34 percent from the 1980s population. This remarkable increase was attributed by the thousands of gold prospectors flocked to Compostela when gold deposits was discovered in Sitios Kantigbao, Mambusao, Pulang-lupa and Bango of Barangay Ngan in 1983 to 1988.

In 1995, only 1,484 or 2.77 percent increase was recorded with an average growth rate of 0.55 percent.

During the 1990 census, the municipality's population grew up to 61,667, posting an increase of 6,637 persons or 12.06 percent over the 1990 figure.

=== Urban-Rural Distribution/Density ===
As of the 2010 census, Barangay Poblacion, being the only urban barangay, has the highest number of population among the sixteen (16) barangays of Compostela with 26,773 or 32.7 percent of the municipality's total population; it is followed by Barangay Ngan (9.4 percent) and Barangay San Miguel (9.0 percent). Barangay Panansalan, on the other hand, Barangay is the least populated barangay with 906 people of 1.1 percent to the total population.

Poblacion, the most inhabited barangay has a population density of 52.0 persons per hectare, and Tamia, on the other hand, is the least densely populated barangay with 0.73 persons per hectare.

=== Sex Distribution/Composition ===
In 2000, males outnumbered females with a sex ratio of 106.26 males for every 100 females. Males dominated the age group 79 years and below while females in the age group 80 and over.

Age group 5 to 9 dominated the municipality's total population with 14.34 percent share to the population. This is followed by age group 10–14 with 13.72 percent and then by those aged 15–19 years with 11.01 percent.

=== Marital Status ===
Out of 45,010 household population 10 years old and over, 45.23 percent were single; 44.97 percent were married; 3.32 percent were widowed; 0.78 percent were separated; and those with other marital arrangements registered at 5.70 percent.

Single males prevailed over single females (55.47 percent), married (50.03 percent), separated (50.14 percent), and among those with other marital arrangements (50.95 percent). On contrary, most of the widowed were females (72.26 percent).

== Economy ==
Poverty incidence of Compostela (%)

Source: Philippine Statistics Authority

Since its establishment the town slowly rose from a municipality into one of the progressive towns of the valley. Its vast flat lands become the rice production area of Davao Province when the National Irrigation Administration-Asian Development Bank (NIA-ADB) constructed an irrigation system in the early part of 1970 that serve the south-western portion of the municipality. Also, cavendish bananas are produced here by the Ayala Conglomerate and Multi-National Dole (Stanfilco), Philippines, Incorporated. But its development has been attributed to the efforts of its residence. This development is reflected today in the urban center with modern amenities and educational institutions.

== Government ==
Elected officials 2022-2025:

- Municipal Mayor: Levi S. Ebdao
- Municipal Vice-mayor: Ricky P. Hechanova
- Council members:
  - Jase Karl M. Ang
  - Engr. Alan M. Calalas
  - Danielo B. Pelegrino
  - Engr. Elmer Paul Bangcasan
  - Haidee C. Suarez-Jimenez
  - Harry Cabiling
  - Juric G. Blanco
  - Rogelio Econar
- Gil P. Blanco - Indigenous People's Representative
- Mylene P. Bacote - SKMF President
- Lolito C. Pavia - Liga Ng Mga Barangay President (OIC)

== Education ==
Elementary Schools:

- Compostela Central Elementary School SPED Center
- Assumption Academy of Compostela, Inc
- Compostela Christian School

High Schools:

- Compostela National High School
- Assumption Academy of Compostela, Inc
- Compostela Christian School

Colleges:

- Legacy College of Compostela (LCC)
- Davao de Oro State College (DDOSC), formerly Compostela Valley State College
