= Davao de Oro's 1st congressional district =

Legislative district of the Philippines

- Constituency for the House of Representatives of the Philippines
- Location of Davao de Oro within the Philippines
- Province: Davao de Oro
- Region: Davao Region
- Population: 346,257 (2020)
- Electorate: 233,351 (2022)
- Major settlements: 5 LGUs: Municipalities; Compostela; Maragusan; Monkayo; Montevista; New Bataan
- Area: 2,069.03 km^{2} (798.86 sq mi)

Current constituency
- Created: 1998
- Representative: Maricar Zamora
- Political party: PFP
- Congressional bloc: Majority

Davao de Oro's 1st congressional district is a congressional district for the House of Representatives of the Philippines in the province of Davao de Oro, formerly Compostela Valley. It was created ahead of the 1998 Philippine House of Representatives elections by Republic Act No. 8470 that established the province initially named Compostela Valley. The district encompasses most of the area of its namesake valley in the Mindanao Pacific Cordillera which were formerly within Davao del Norte's 1st district. It currently comprises the municipalities of Compostela, Maragusan, Monkayo, Montevista and New Bataan. It is currently represented in the 20th Congress by Maricar Zamora of the Partido Federal ng Pilipinas (PFP).

== Representation history ==
#	Image	Member	Term of office		Congress	Party	Electoral history	Constituent LGUs
#	Image	Member	Start	End	Congress	Party	Electoral history	Constituent LGUs
=== Compostela Valley's 1st district for the House of Representatives of the Philippines ===
District created January 30, 1998.
1		Rogelio M. Sarmiento	June 30, 1998	June 30, 2001	11th	LAMMP	Redistricted from Davao del Norte's 1st district and re-elected in 1998.	1998–2019; Compostela, Maragusan, Monkayo, Montevista, New Bataan
2		Manuel E. Zamora	June 30, 2001	June 30, 2010	12th	Lakas	Elected in 2001.	1998–2019; Compostela, Maragusan, Monkayo, Montevista, New Bataan
2		Manuel E. Zamora	June 30, 2001	June 30, 2010	13th	Lakas	Re-elected in 2004.	1998–2019; Compostela, Maragusan, Monkayo, Montevista, New Bataan
2		Manuel E. Zamora	June 30, 2001	June 30, 2010	14th	Lakas	Re-elected in 2007.	1998–2019; Compostela, Maragusan, Monkayo, Montevista, New Bataan
3		Maria Carmen Zamora-Mabanglo	June 30, 2010	June 30, 2019	15th	Liberal	Elected in 2010.	1998–2019; Compostela, Maragusan, Monkayo, Montevista, New Bataan
3		Maria Carmen Zamora-Mabanglo	June 30, 2010	June 30, 2019	16th	Liberal	Re-elected in 2013.	1998–2019; Compostela, Maragusan, Monkayo, Montevista, New Bataan
3		Maria Carmen Zamora-Mabanglo	June 30, 2010	June 30, 2019	17th	HNP	Re-elected in 2016.	1998–2019; Compostela, Maragusan, Monkayo, Montevista, New Bataan
=== Davao de Oro's 1st district for the House of Representatives of the Philippines ===
(2)		Manuel E. Zamora	June 30, 2019	June 30, 2022	18th	HNP	Elected in 2019.	2019–present Compostela, Maragusan, Monkayo, Montevista, New Bataan
(3)		Maria Carmen Zamora-Mabanglo	June 30, 2022	Incumbent	19th	Lakas (HNP)	Elected in 2022.	2019–present Compostela, Maragusan, Monkayo, Montevista, New Bataan
(3)		Maria Carmen Zamora-Mabanglo	June 30, 2022	Incumbent	20th	PFP	Re-elected in 2025.	2019–present Compostela, Maragusan, Monkayo, Montevista, New Bataan

== Election results ==
=== 2025 ===
Candidate	Party	Votes	%
Maricar Zamora (incumbent)	Lakas–CMD	134,782	67.15
Franco Tito	Independent	47,988	23.91
Joselito Brillantes	Independent	17,938	8.94
Total		200,708	100.00
Valid votes		200,708	91.25
Invalid/blank votes		19,236	8.75
Total votes		219,944	100.00
Registered voters/turnout		245,824	89.47
Lakas–CMD hold			
Source: Commission on Elections

=== 2022 ===
2022 Philippine House of Representatives elections
Party	Candidate	Votes	%
Hugpong	Maricar Zamora	104,779	54.14
PDP–Laban	Joanna Gentugaya	82,898	42.83
Independent	Nena "Ate Nenz" Atamosa	5,863	3.03
Total votes		193,540	100.00
Hugpong hold			

=== 2019 ===
2019 Philippine House of Representatives elections
Party	Candidate	Votes	%
Hugpong	Manuel E. Zamora	78,257	
Independent	Franco Tito	70,808	
Total votes			100.00
Hugpong hold			

== See also ==
- Legislative districts of Davao de Oro
