= Kapalong =

Municipality in Davao del Norte, Philippines

- Municipality
- Municipality of Kapalong
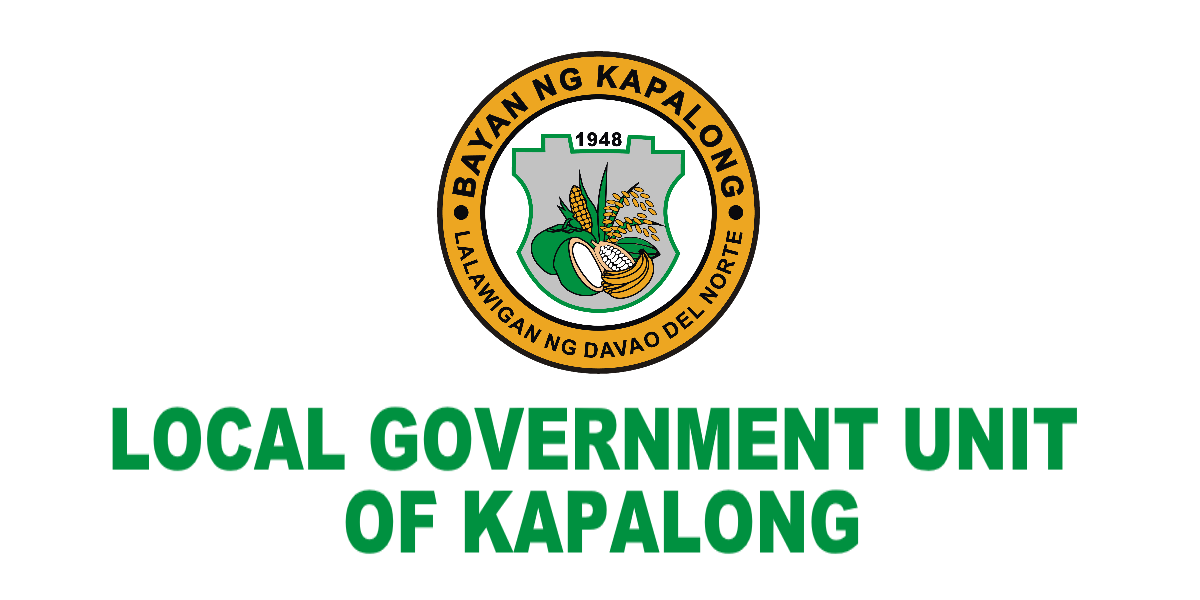
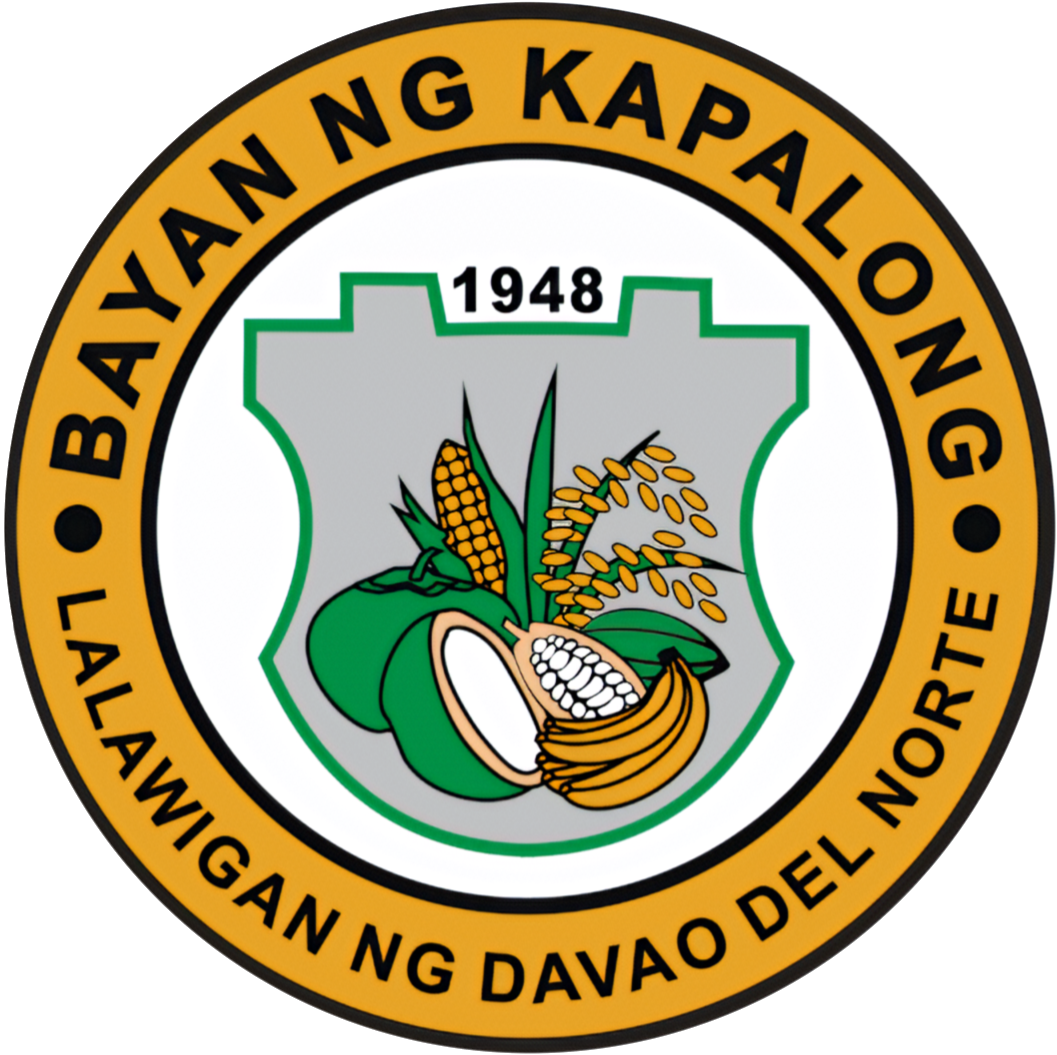
- Flag Seal

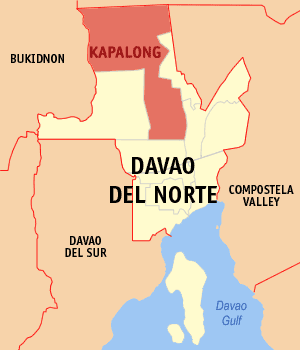
- Map of Davao del Norte with Kapalong highlighted
- Interactive map of Kapalong
- Location within the Philippines
- Coordinates: 7°35′08″N 125°42′19″E
- Country: Philippines
- Region: Davao Region
- Province: Davao del Norte
- District: 1st district
- Founded: July 8, 1948
- Barangays: 14 (see Barangays)

Government
  - Type: Sangguniang Bayan
  - Mayor: Maria Theresa R. Timbol
  - Vice Mayor: Edgardo L. Timbol
  - Representative: De Carlo Uy (Lakas-CMD)
  - Municipal Council: Members: Thacher C. Jara; Joevin P. Doriman; Eduardo A. Domat-ol; Edilberto C. Febria Sr.; Baltazar R. Solis Jr.; Jonathan P. Pineda Sr.; Robert T. Caminero; Romel J. Beldua
  - Electorate: 52,281 voters (2025)

Area
  - Total: 830.01 km^{2} (320.47 sq mi)
- Elevation: 24 m (79 ft)
- Highest elevation: 52 m (171 ft)
- Lowest elevation: 14 m (46 ft)

Population (2024 census)
  - Total: 80,731
  - Density: 97.265/km^{2} (251.92/sq mi)
  - Households: 19,041

Economy
  - Income class: 1st municipal income class
  - Poverty incidence: 14.65% (2023)
  - Revenue: ₱ 650.3 million (2024)
  - Assets: ₱ 1,188 million (2024)
  - Expenditure: ₱ 579.1 million (2024)
  - Liabilities: ₱ 238.7 million (2024)

Service provider
  - Electricity: Northern Davao Electric Cooperative (NORDECO)
- Time zone: UTC+8 (PST)
- ZIP code: 8113
- PSGC: 1102305000
- IDD : area code: +63 (0)84
- Native languages: Davawenyo; Cebuano; Ata Manobo; Kalagan; Tagalog
- Website: www.kapalong.gov.ph

Kapalong, officially the Municipality of Kapalong (Cebuano: Lungsod sa Kapalong; Tagalog: Bayan ng Kapalong), is a municipality in the province of Davao del Norte, Philippines. According to the 2024 census, it has a population of 80,731 people.

== History ==
Through Executive Order No. 151 signed by President Elpidio Quirino, the town was founded on July 8, 1948, from the Municipal District of Tagum, which was formed in 1918. It was one of the oldest towns in Davao del Norte Province, others being Tagum, in 1941; and Panabo, in 1949, both of which were converted into cities more than 50 years later. Though the towns of Santo Tomas, Talaingod and portion of what is now Sawata emerged from Kapalong in 1959, 1991, and 2004 respectively, it is still the largest town by land area in the province of Davao del Norte.

== Geography ==
All but one of Kapalong’s barangays are located in the southern part of the municipality near the Kapalong-Talaingod-Valencia National Highway. The much more sparsely populated north is administered under Barangay Gupitan covering a land area of 65,000 ha (650 km^{2}) which makes it the largest barangay of the Philippines.

=== Climate ===
Climate data for Kapalong
Month	Jan	Feb	Mar	Apr	May	Jun	Jul	Aug	Sep	Oct	Nov	Dec	Year
Mean daily maximum °C (°F)	28 (82)	28 (82)	29 (84)	31 (88)	31 (88)	30 (86)	30 (86)	31 (88)	31 (88)	31 (88)	30 (86)	29 (84)	30 (86)
Mean daily minimum °C (°F)	22 (72)	22 (72)	22 (72)	22 (72)	23 (73)	24 (75)	23 (73)	23 (73)	23 (73)	23 (73)	23 (73)	23 (73)	23 (73)
Average precipitation mm (inches)	63 (2.5)	50 (2.0)	35 (1.4)	22 (0.9)	47 (1.9)	68 (2.7)	51 (2.0)	53 (2.1)	49 (1.9)	47 (1.9)	39 (1.5)	38 (1.5)	562 (22.3)
Average rainy days	15.0	12.6	10.4	8.2	18.8	22.5	21.2	20.5	20.3	20.3	14.4	11.7	195.9
Source: Meteoblue

=== Barangays ===
Kapalong is politically subdivided into 14 barangays. Each barangay consists of puroks while some have sitios.

- Semong
- Florida
- Gabuyan
- Gupitan
- Capungagan
- Katipunan
- Luna
- Mabantao
- Mamacao
- Pag-asa
- Maniki (Poblacion)
- Sampao
- Sua-on
- Tiburcia

== Demographics ==
Population census of Kapalong
Year	Pop.	±% p.a.
1939	5,555	—
1948	5,878	+0.63%
1960	12,067	+6.18%
1970	20,225	+5.29%
1975	33,362	+10.56%
1980	42,869	+5.14%
1990	66,030	+4.42%
1995	62,183	−1.12%
2000	68,593	+2.13%
2007	61,763	−1.44%
2010	68,261	+3.71%
2015	76,334	+2.15%
2020	81,068	+1.27%
2024	80,731	−0.10%
Source: Philippine Statistics Authority

== Economy ==
Poverty incidence of Kapalong (%)

Source: Philippine Statistics Authority
