= Talaingod =

Municipality in Davao del Norte, Philippines

- Municipality
- Municipality of Talaingod
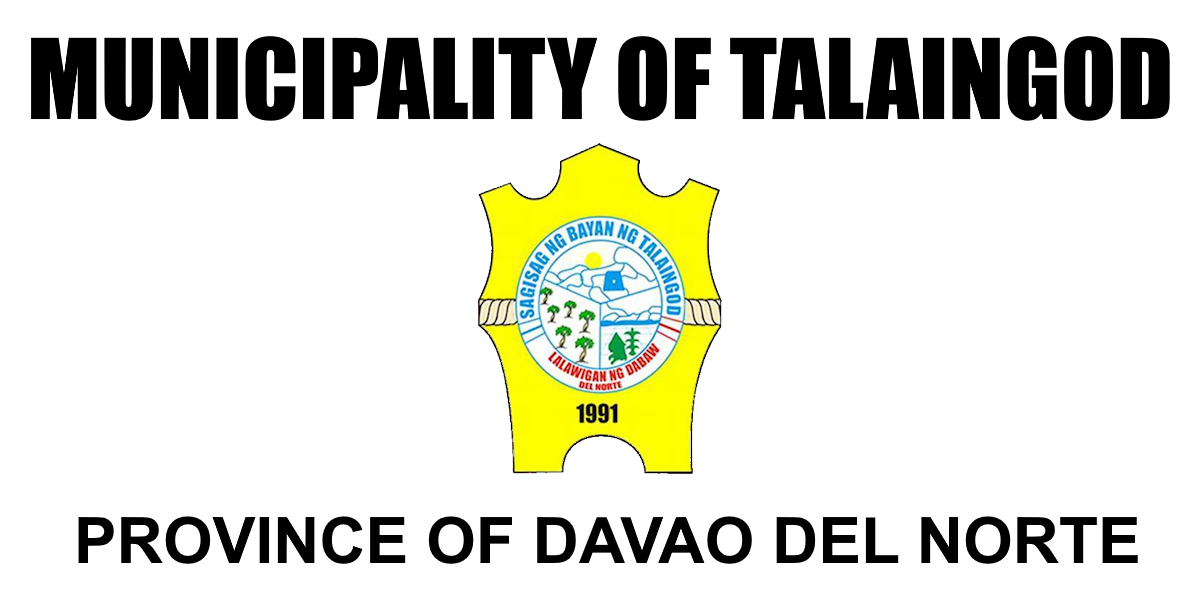
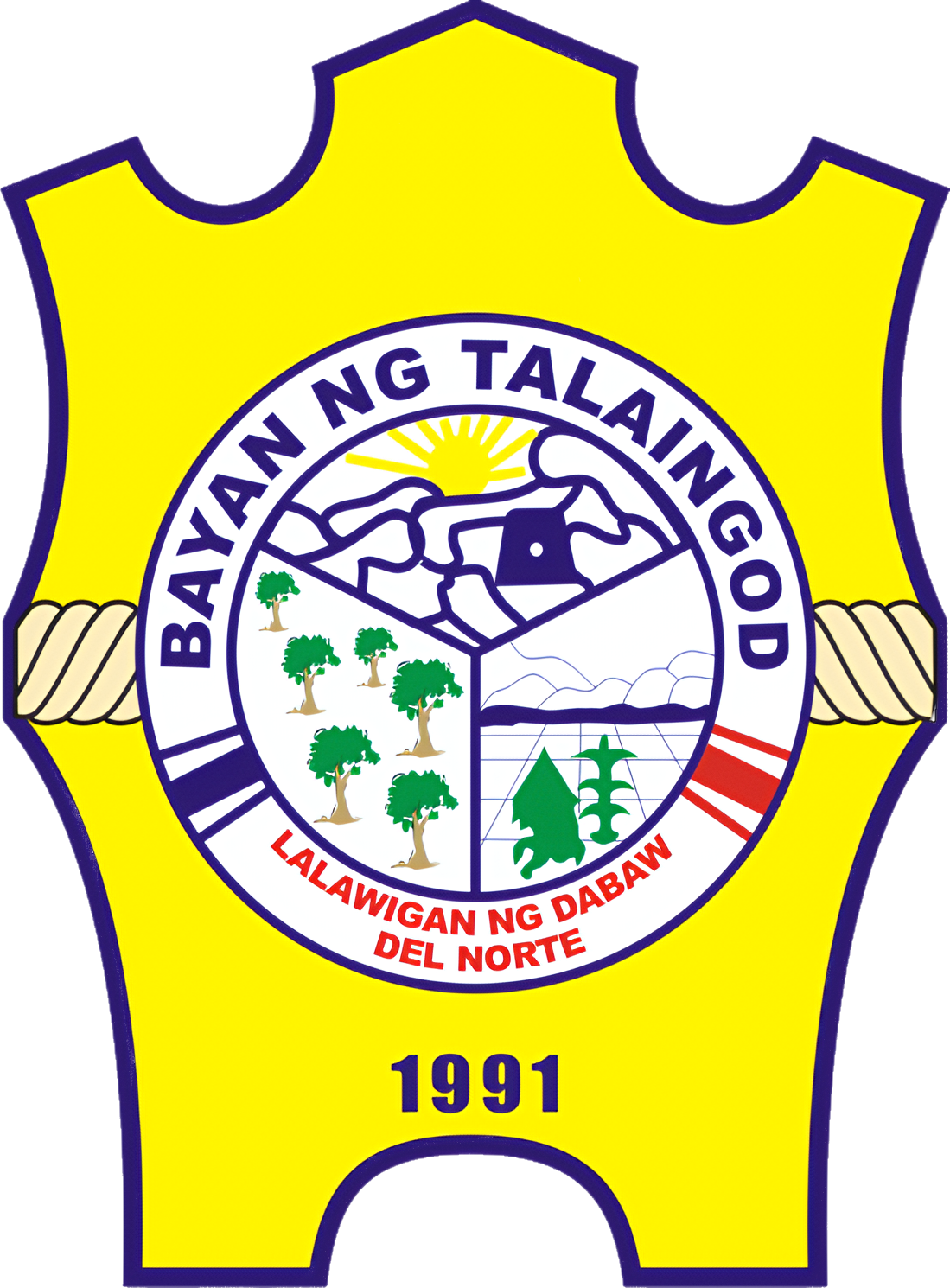
- Flag Seal

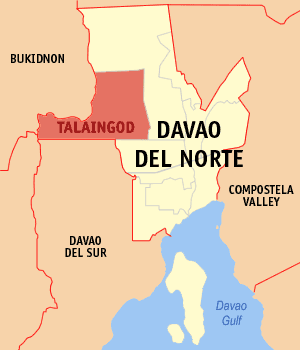
- Map of Davao del Norte with Talaingod highlighted
- Interactive map of Talaingod
- Location within the Philippines
- Coordinates: 7°37′57″N 125°34′29″E
- Country: Philippines
- Region: Davao Region
- Province: Davao del Norte
- District: 1st district
- Barangays: 3 (see Barangays)

Government
  - Type: Sangguniang Bayan
  - Mayor: Jonnie A. Libayao
  - Vice Mayor: Francisco G. Gipulla Jr.
  - Representative: Pantaleon D. Alvarez
  - Municipal Council: Members: Rolando C. Piquero; Basilio A. Libayao; Salvador T. Nepa; Sylveth S. Gaila; Gerardo L. Colobong; Jaypee M. Sibogan; Jimboy D. Acao; Roger S. Openiano
  - Electorate: 16,774 voters (2025)

Area
  - Total: 656.83 km^{2} (253.60 sq mi)
- Elevation: 209 m (686 ft)
- Highest elevation: 591 m (1,939 ft)
- Lowest elevation: 46 m (151 ft)

Population (2024 census)
  - Total: 28,665
  - Density: 43.641/km^{2} (113.03/sq mi)
  - Households: 6,422

Economy
  - Income class: 1st municipal income class
  - Poverty incidence: 46.11% (2023)
  - Revenue: ₱ 297 million (2024)
  - Assets: ₱ 521.2 million (2024)
  - Expenditure: ₱ 292 million (2024)
  - Liabilities: ₱ 194 million (2024)

Service provider
  - Electricity: Davao Light and Power Company (DLPC)
  - Water: Talaingod Water Service Cooperative (TWSC)
- Time zone: UTC+8 (PST)
- ZIP code: 8100
- PSGC: 1102322000
- IDD : area code: +63 (0)84
- Native languages: Davawenyo; Cebuano; Ata Manobo; Kalagan; Tagalog
- Website: www.talaingod.gov.ph

Talaingod, officially the Municipality of Talaingod (Cebuano: Lungsod sa Talaingod; Tagalog: Bayan ng Talaingod), is a municipality in the province of Davao del Norte, Philippines. According to the 2024 census, it has a population of 28,665 people.

The town was created by virtue of Republic Act No. 7081 on July 29, 1991. The municipality is formerly the part of Kapalong.

== Geography ==
=== Climate ===
Climate data for Talaingod, Davao del Norte
Month	Jan	Feb	Mar	Apr	May	Jun	Jul	Aug	Sep	Oct	Nov	Dec	Year
Mean daily maximum °C (°F)	28 (82)	28 (82)	29 (84)	31 (88)	31 (88)	30 (86)	30 (86)	31 (88)	31 (88)	30 (86)	30 (86)	29 (84)	30 (86)
Mean daily minimum °C (°F)	22 (72)	22 (72)	22 (72)	22 (72)	23 (73)	23 (73)	23 (73)	23 (73)	23 (73)	23 (73)	23 (73)	23 (73)	23 (73)
Average precipitation mm (inches)	63 (2.5)	50 (2.0)	35 (1.4)	22 (0.9)	47 (1.9)	68 (2.7)	51 (2.0)	53 (2.1)	49 (1.9)	47 (1.9)	39 (1.5)	38 (1.5)	562 (22.3)
Average rainy days	15.0	12.6	10.4	8.2	18.8	22.5	21.2	20.5	20.3	20.3	14.4	11.7	195.9
Source: Meteoblue

=== Barangays ===
Talaingod is politically subdivided into 3 barangays. Each barangay consists of puroks while some have sitios.

- Dagohoy
- Palma Gil
- Santo Niño

== Demographics ==
Population census of Talaingod
Year	Pop.	±% p.a.
1995	12,853	—
2000	16,594	+5.63%
2007	19,600	+2.32%
2010	25,566	+10.15%
2015	27,482	+1.39%
2020	28,333	+0.64%
2024	28,665	+0.28%
Source: Philippine Statistics Authority

== Economy ==
Poverty incidence of Talaingod (%)

Source: Philippine Statistics Authority
