= Maragusan =

Municipality in Davao de Oro, Philippines

Maragusan San Mariano
- Municipality
- Municipality of Maragusan
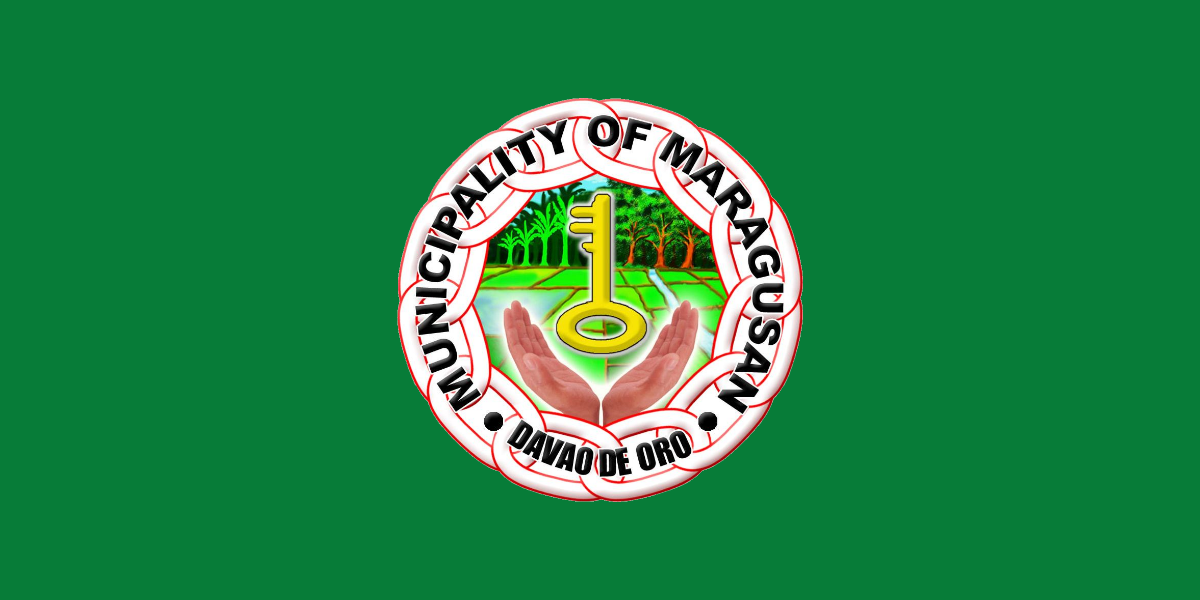
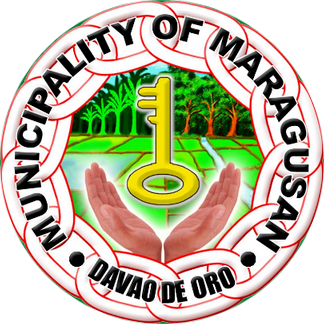
- Flag Seal

- Map of Davao de Oro with Maragusan highlighted
- Interactive map of Maragusan
- Location within the Philippines
- Coordinates: 7°19′01″N 126°07′26″E
- Country: Philippines
- Region: Davao Region
- Province: Davao de Oro
- District: 1st district
- Founded: November 25, 1977
- Barangays: 24 (see Barangays)

Government
  - Type: Sangguniang Bayan
  - Mayor: Cesar C. Colina Sr.
  - Vice Mayor: Osberht Yanong
  - Representative: Maria Carmen S. Zamora-Apsay
  - Electorate: 46,326 voters (2025)

Area
  - Total: 394.27 km^{2} (152.23 sq mi)
- Elevation: 813 m (2,667 ft)
- Highest elevation: 1,544 m (5,066 ft)
- Lowest elevation: 615 m (2,018 ft)

Population (2024 census)
  - Total: 67,759
  - Density: 171.86/km^{2} (445.11/sq mi)
  - Households: 16,002

Economy
  - Income class: 1st municipal income class
  - Poverty incidence: 14.6% (2023)
  - Revenue: ₱ 351.8 million (2024)
  - Assets: ₱ 760.9 million (2024)
  - Expenditure: ₱ 327.7 million (2024)
  - Liabilities: ₱ 118.7 million (2024)

Service provider
  - Electricity: Northern Davao Electric Cooperative (NORDECO)
- Time zone: UTC+8 (PST)
- ZIP code: 8808
- PSGC: 1108205000
- IDD : area code: +63 (0)87
- Native languages: Davawenyo; Cebuano; Kalagan; Mansaka; Tagalog; Ata Manobo
- Website: www.maragusan.gov.ph

Maragusan, officially the Municipality of Maragusan (Cebuano: Lungsod sa Maragusan; Tagalog: Bayan ng Maragusan), is a municipality in the province of Davao de Oro, Philippines. According to the 2024 census, it has a population of 67,759 people.

== History ==
=== Pre-foundation ===
The area in what is now Maragusan is a valley that in the past was inhabited solely by native Mansakan people who made their living by engaging in slash-and-burn agricultural practices. They identified themselves as “Man-Agusan” which means those living on the banks of the Agusan River which had its source within the boundaries of the present municipality.

The area which is now Maragusan was made part of the municipality of Doña Alicia which was created on May 28, 1953, by virtue of Executive Order No. 596 of Pres. Elpidio Quirino, which was renamed Mabini a year later. By the time the town was created with which the area became part of, the valley remained undiscovered by settlers until in 1955 a pilot and a rancher from Lake Leonard discovered it by accident while travelling off-course. This triggered the creation of an agricultural settlement located in the Aguakan Springs which is now the location of the town center. The name of the settlement gradually became "Maragusan" which is a corruption of the “Man-Agusan” which was how the Mansakan natives of the area referred to themselves.

Maragusan eventually became a barangay of Mabini of in 1962. But while it grew as an agricultural settlement located in a valley, it had no direct route to Mabini's town center or government facilities. Hence, as early as 1972, locals have been clamoring for the establishment of a municipality in the area. A proposal to name it "San Mariano" was made, named after Mariano Marcos who is the father of then-President Ferdinand Marcos to expedite its creation.

=== Establishment ===
Finally, on November 25, 1977, San Mariano was created as a municipality in the province of Davao del Norte under Presidential Decree No. 1247 signed by President Marcos himself, with barangay Maragusan made as seat of local government. Following the ouster of Marcos in 1986, the municipality of San Mariano was officially renamed Maragusan on October 12, 1988.

In 1998, Maragusan became part of Compostela Valley (now Davao de Oro).

== Geography ==
=== Barangays ===
Maragusan is politically subdivided into 24 barangays. Each barangay consists of puroks while some have sitios.

- Bagong Silang
- Mapawa
- Maragusan (Poblacion)
- New Albay
- Tupaz
- Bahi
- Cambagang
- Coronobé
- Katipunan
- Lahi
- Langgawisan
- Mabugnao
- Magcagong
- Mahayahay
- Mauswagon
- New Katipunan
- New Manay
- New Panay
- Paloc
- Pamintaran
- Parasanon
- Talian
- Tandik
- Tigbao

=== Climate ===
Climate data for Maragusan
Month	Jan	Feb	Mar	Apr	May	Jun	Jul	Aug	Sep	Oct	Nov	Dec	Year
Mean daily maximum °C (°F)	23 (73)	23 (73)	24 (75)	25 (77)	25 (77)	24 (75)	24 (75)	24 (75)	25 (77)	25 (77)	24 (75)	24 (75)	24 (75)
Mean daily minimum °C (°F)	17 (63)	17 (63)	17 (63)	18 (64)	19 (66)	19 (66)	19 (66)	19 (66)	19 (66)	19 (66)	18 (64)	18 (64)	18 (65)
Average precipitation mm (inches)	137 (5.4)	114 (4.5)	124 (4.9)	109 (4.3)	230 (9.1)	303 (11.9)	235 (9.3)	216 (8.5)	214 (8.4)	237 (9.3)	210 (8.3)	132 (5.2)	2,261 (89.1)
Average rainy days	15.8	13.8	14.9	17.4	26.7	28.4	28.0	27.6	26.2	27.5	24.4	18.3	269
Source: Meteoblue

== Demographics ==
Population census of Maragusan
Year	Pop.	±% p.a.
1980	20,220	—
1990	40,982	+7.32%
1995	40,834	−0.07%
2000	45,937	+2.56%
2007	51,547	+1.60%
2010	55,503	+2.73%
2015	60,842	+1.76%
2020	64,412	+1.21%
2024	67,759	+1.22%
Source: Philippine Statistics Authority

In the 2024 census, the population of Maragusan was 67,759 people, with a density of 170 inhabitants per square kilometre or 440 inhabitants per square mile. It ranks 3rd most populated municipality in the first district of Davao de Oro.

== Economy ==
Poverty incidence of Maragusan (%)

Source: Philippine Statistics Authority

== See also ==
- List of renamed cities and municipalities in the Philippines
