= Maco, Davao de Oro =

Municipality in Davao de Oro, Philippines

Maco
- Municipality
- Municipality of Maco
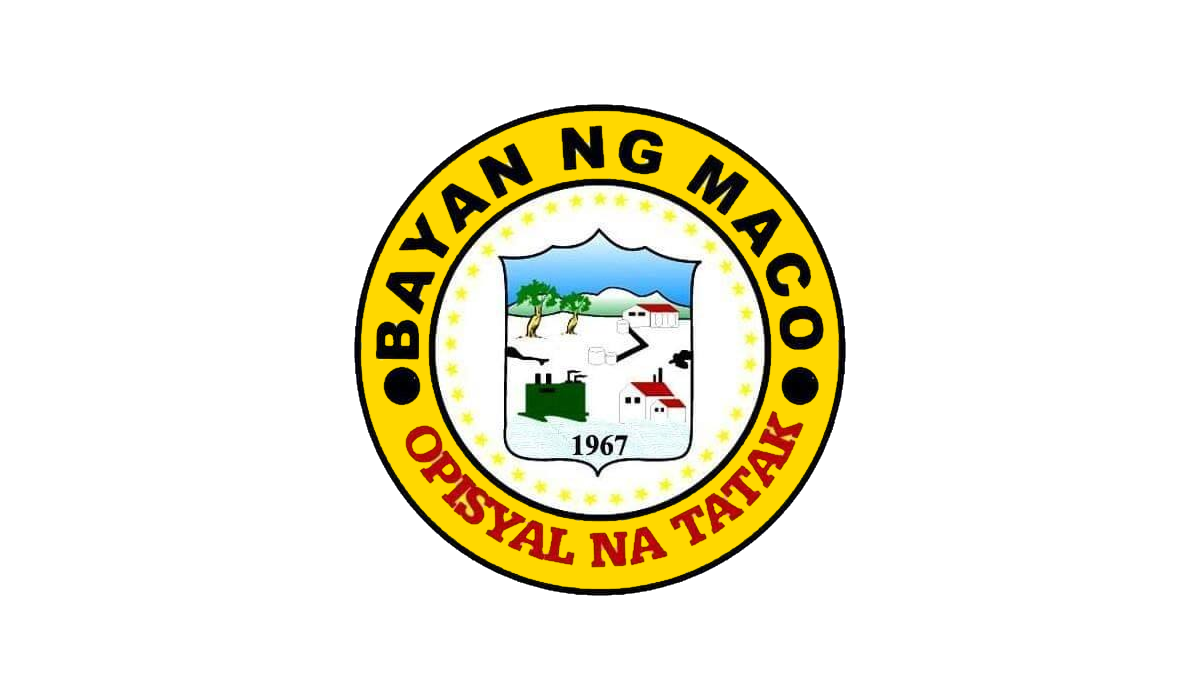
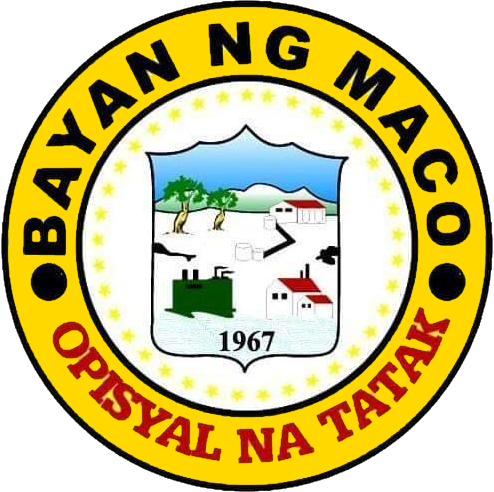
- Flag Seal
- Nickname: The Gold Coast
- Map of Davao de Oro with Maco highlighted
- Interactive map of Maco
- Location within the Philippines
- Coordinates: 7°22′11″N 125°51′21″E
- Country: Philippines
- Region: Davao Region
- Province: Davao de Oro
- District: 2nd district
- Founded: June 17, 1967
- Barangays: 37 (see Barangays)

Government
  - Type: Sangguniang Bayan
  - Mayor: Alvera Veronica R. Rimando-Arancon
  - Vice Mayor: Arthur Carlos Voltaire R. Rimando
  - Representative: Ruwel Peter S. Gonzaga
  - Electorate: 63,871 voters (2025)

Area
  - Total: 342.23 km^{2} (132.14 sq mi)
- Elevation: 114 m (374 ft)
- Highest elevation: 843 m (2,766 ft)
- Lowest elevation: 0 m (0 ft)

Population (2024 census)
  - Total: 87,680
  - Density: 256.2/km^{2} (663.6/sq mi)
  - Households: 20,839

Economy
  - Income class: 1st municipal income class
  - Poverty incidence: 12.84% (2023)
  - Revenue: ₱ 640.8 million (2024)
  - Assets: ₱ 1,149 million (2024)
  - Expenditure: ₱ 604.5 million (2024)
  - Liabilities: ₱ 252.6 million (2024)

Service provider
  - Electricity: Northern Davao Electric Cooperative (NORDECO)
  - Water: Maco Waterworks System
- Time zone: UTC+8 (PST)
- ZIP code: 8806
- PSGC: 1108204000
- IDD : area code: +63 (0)87
- Native languages: Davawenyo; Cebuano; Kalagan; Mansaka; Tagalog; Ata Manobo
- Website: www.maco.gov.ph

Maco, officially the Municipality of Maco (Cebuano: Lungsod sa Maco; Tagalog: Bayan ng Maco), is a municipality in the province of Davao de Oro, Philippines. According to the 2024 census, it has a population of 87,680 people.

It was formerly part of the Municipality of Mabini before becoming an independent municipality on June 17, 1967.

== Geography ==
=== Barangays ===
Maco is politically subdivided into 42 barangays. Each barangay consists of puroks while some have sitios.

- Anibongan
- Anislagan
- Buanan
- Bucana
- Calabcab
- Concepcion
- Dumlan
- Elizalde (Somil)
- Pangi (Gaudencio Antonio)
- Gubatan
- Hijo
- Kinuban
- Langgam
- Lapu-lapu
- Libay-libay
- Limbo
- Lumatab
- Magangit
- Malamodao
- Manipongol
- Mapaang
- Masara
- New Asturias
- Panibasan
- Panoraon
- Poblacion
- San Juan
- San Roque
- Sangab
- Taglawig
- Mainit
- New Barili
- New Leyte
- New Visayas
- Panangan
- Tagbaros
- Teresa
- Ubalaz
- Unangian
- Uracia
- Vacolan
- Vancezo

=== Climate ===
Climate data for Maco
Month	Jan	Feb	Mar	Apr	May	Jun	Jul	Aug	Sep	Oct	Nov	Dec	Year
Mean daily maximum °C (°F)	29 (84)	30 (86)	30 (86)	31 (88)	31 (88)	30 (86)	30 (86)	30 (86)	30 (86)	30 (86)	30 (86)	30 (86)	30 (86)
Mean daily minimum °C (°F)	22 (72)	22 (72)	22 (72)	23 (73)	24 (75)	24 (75)	24 (75)	24 (75)	24 (75)	24 (75)	23 (73)	22 (72)	23 (74)
Average precipitation mm (inches)	98 (3.9)	86 (3.4)	91 (3.6)	83 (3.3)	133 (5.2)	158 (6.2)	111 (4.4)	101 (4.0)	94 (3.7)	117 (4.6)	131 (5.2)	94 (3.7)	1,297 (51.2)
Average rainy days	16.4	14.3	16.3	18.5	25.3	25.0	23.8	21.9	20.8	24.4	24.3	18.7	249.7
Source: Meteoblue

== Demographics ==
Population census of Maco
Year	Pop.	±% p.a.
1970	29,693	—
1975	32,562	+1.87%
1980	41,017	+4.72%
1990	55,991	+3.16%
1995	58,609	+0.86%
2000	65,181	+2.30%
2007	70,906	+1.17%
2010	72,235	+0.68%
2015	81,277	+2.27%
2020	83,237	+0.50%
2024	87,680	+1.26%
Source: Philippine Statistics Authority

In the 2024 census, the population of Maco was 87,680 people, with a density of 260 inhabitants per square kilometre or 670 inhabitants per square mile.

== Economy ==
Poverty incidence of Maco (%)

Source: Philippine Statistics Authority

== Festivals and events ==
Fiesta ng Maco
is celebrated annually on the last Saturday of June, honoring "Inahan sa Kanunay'ng Panabang" (Mother of Perpetual Help).

Kaimonan Festival
is an annual festival that starts on June 17 to the last Saturday of the same month. Kaimonan is a mansaka term for "thanksgiving".

== See also ==
- List of renamed cities and municipalities in the Philippines
