= Montevista =

Municipality in Davao de Oro, Philippines

- Municipality
- Municipality of Montevista
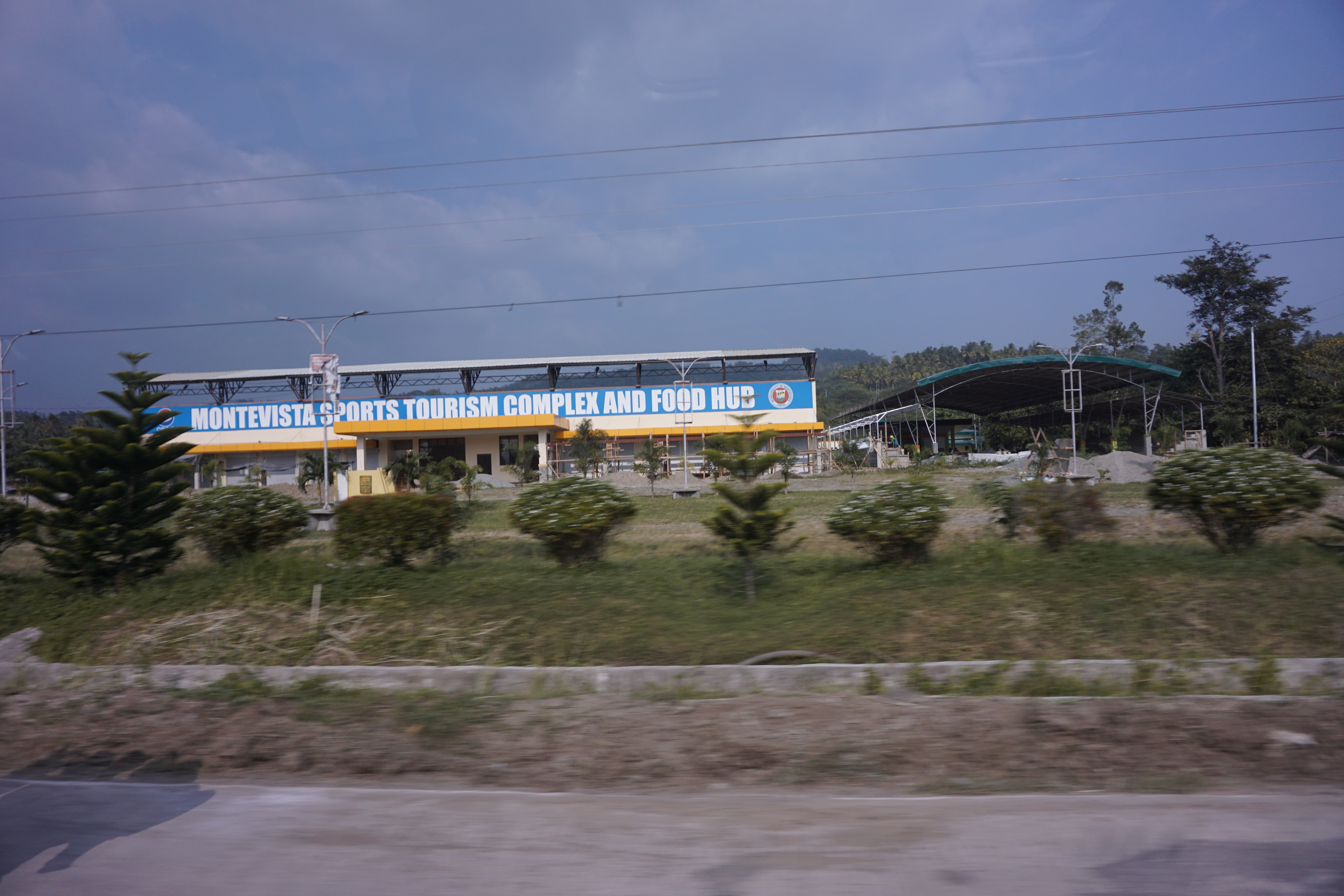
- Montevista Sports Tourism Complex and Food Hub from National Highway

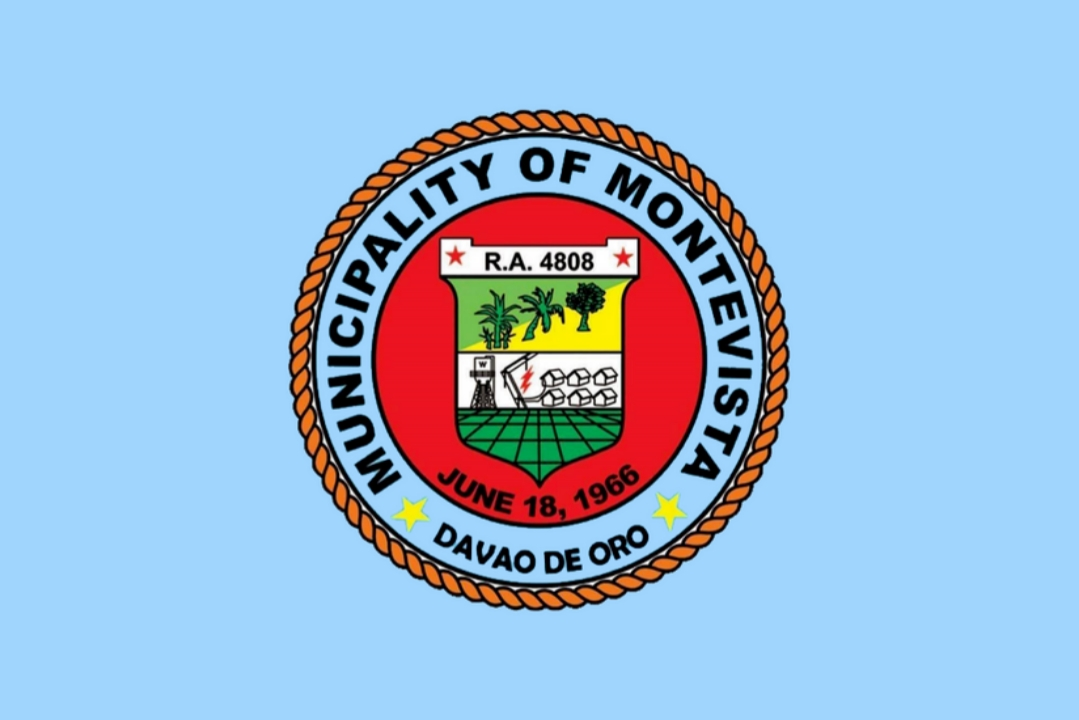
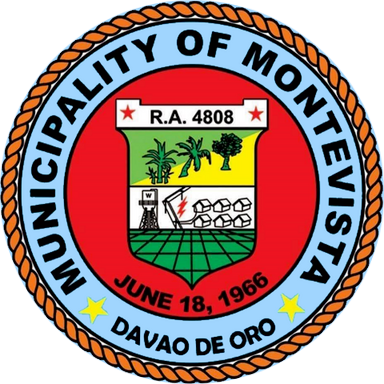
- Flag Seal
- Nickname: Christmas Capital of Davao de Oro
- Motto(s): God-Centered, Self-Sufficient, and Self-Reliant
- Map of Davao de Oro with Montevista highlighted
- Interactive map of Montevista
- Location within the Philippines
- Coordinates: 7°42′19″N 125°59′25″E
- Country: Philippines
- Region: Davao Region
- Province: Davao de Oro
- District: 1st district
- Founded: June 18, 1966
- Organized: January 1, 1969
- Barangays: 20 (see Barangays)

Government
  - Type: Sangguniang Bayan
  - Mayor: Cyrex L. Basalo
  - Vice Mayor: Felipe C. Rabanoz
  - Representative: Manuel E. Zamora
  - Electorate: 33,780 voters (2025)

Area
  - Total: 225.00 km^{2} (86.87 sq mi)
- Elevation: 139 m (456 ft)
- Highest elevation: 344 m (1,129 ft)
- Lowest elevation: 59 m (194 ft)

Population (2024 census)
  - Total: 46,581
  - Density: 207.03/km^{2} (536.20/sq mi)
  - Households: 11,807
- Demonym(s): Montevistador; Montevistadora

Economy
  - Income class: 1st municipal income class
  - Poverty incidence: 16.27% (2023)
  - Revenue: ₱ 258.7 million (2024)
  - Assets: ₱ 666.6 million (2024)
  - Expenditure: ₱ 290.8 million (2024)
  - Liabilities: ₱ 146.3 million (2024)

Service provider
  - Electricity: Northern Davao Electric Cooperative (NORDECO)
- Time zone: UTC+8 (PST)
- ZIP code: 8801
- PSGC: 1108208000
- IDD : area code: +63 (0)87
- Native languages: Davawenyo; Cebuano; Kalagan; Mansaka; Tagalog; Ata Manobo
- Website: montevista-comval.gov.ph

Montevista, officially the Municipality of Montevista (Cebuano: Lungsod sa Montevista; Tagalog: Bayan ng Montevista), is a municipality in the province of Davao de Oro, Philippines. According to the 2024 census, it has a population of 46,581 people.

Caumanga, the original name of Montevista, was a haven of the Mandayan Tribe. During the Japanese occupation, Caumanga became the headquarters of the Japanese Imperial Forces who to flocked to the place for protection, shelter, medicine, and food. With the increase of Christian settlers in the early part of 1950s, the name "Caumanga" was changed to San Jose in honor of their Patron Saint, Saint Joseph the Worker. However, it was not until June 18, 1966, when Republic Act No. 4808 was issued creating San Jose into a regular town.

== History ==
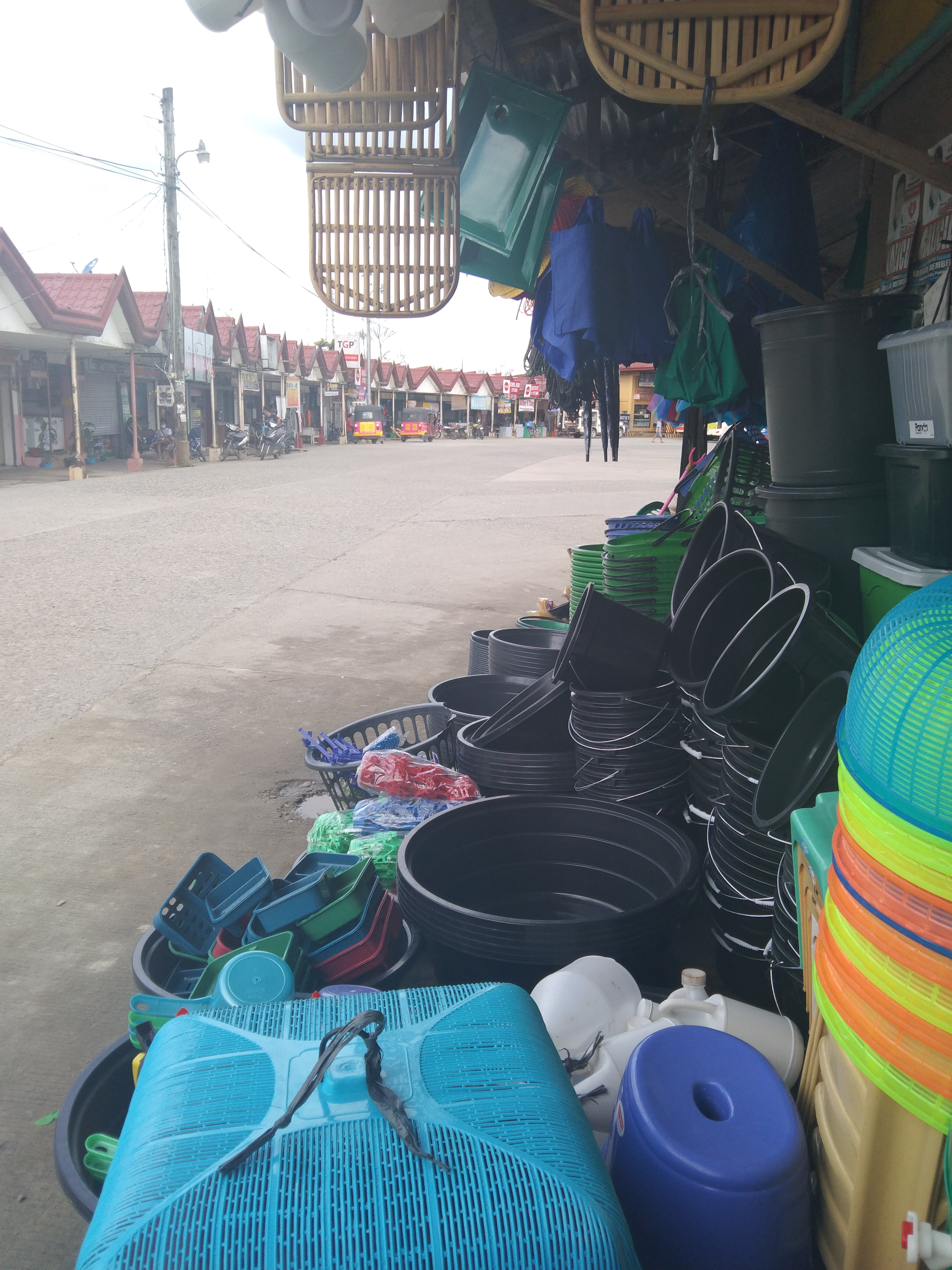
Montevista Davao de Oro Public Terminal

Long before the coming of Christians, "Caumanga", the original name of Barangay San Jose, was home to Mandayan Tribes. It then became the stop-over for migrants (settlers coming from different parts of the country), who came to the place in search of the fertile Compostela Valley.

The first settlers of Caumanga were Boboy Timbang and two cousins named Isig and Amasig, the disciples of Mongado-the first Mandayan Educator. Then followed by Eduardo Torres, Valentin Mabasag and some Christian settlers Julian A. Mascariñas, Leonardo Toyong Sr., Francisco Ramos and ex-councilor Rufino Ubal. These men helped develop Montevista at its early stage.

During the Japanese occupation of World War II, Caumanga became the headquarters of the Japanese Imperial Forces under Inani Murakami, a Japanese Imperial Officer who befriended Fertig's guerilla movement and the Japanese induced the evacuees to flock to Caumanga for protection, shelter, medicine and food and stayed there for good even after the liberation time.

With the increase of Christian Settlers in the early part of the 1950s, the name Caumanga was changed to San Jose in honor of their patron saint, Saint Joseph the Worker.

In 1960, Councilor Rufino Ubal, a member of the Municipal Council of Nabunturan authored a resolution making San Jose a barrio of Nabunturan. The first elected barrio lieutenant was Francisco Ramos and the first Barangay Captain was Julian A. Mascariñas.

Five years after, the barrio officials and some civic minded citizens initiated the separation of barrio San Jose from its mother municipality thus, in 1965, the Barangay Council of San Jose made a resolution addressed to the Provincial Board, proposing to create Barrio San Jose and neighboring barrios (barangays) into a separate town.

Board member Simplicio Montaño, the Grand Old Man of San Jose who was inspired by a place in California, United States, which had a semblance in topography to San Jose, changed the name from San Jose to Montevista meaning "mountain view". Also it was Montaño who worked hard for its approval in Congress, thus in June 1966, Montevista became a regular municipality.

Montevista became a regular municipality on June 18, 1966, by virtue of Republic Act no. 4808 comprising the six barangays of San Jose, New Visayas, Camansi, Bankerohan Norte, Bankerohan Sur and Linoan. These barangays were formerly parts of the municipalities of Nabunturan, Monkayo, Compostela and Asuncion. On May 8, 1967, following the division of Davao, the area became part of the new province of Davao del Norte.

Though Montevista was created on June 18, 1966, its political administration took effect on January 1, 1969, with Bernardo R. Rabanoz as the first elected mayor. After serving his term he was then succeeded by Simplicio Montaño, who barely served a month due to his untimely death. Vice Mayor Julian A. Mascariñas succeeded him and he served as the Municipal Mayor from February 11, 1972, to March 2, 1980. Mayor Bernardo R. Rabanoz took the reign of administration after winning the 1980 electoral race, serving for six years until April 1986.

After the EDSA Revolution, Felipe B. Flores was designated on April 14, 1986, as Officer-In-Charge Mayor under the Freedom Constitution replacing elected Mayor Bernardo R. Rabanoz to last until December 6, 1987. In turn, Emiliano A. Corias was designated as OIC Mayor and served as the Local Chief Executive from December 7, 1987, to February 1, 1988.

On March 7, 1998, Montevista became part of the new province of Compostela Valley (now Davao de Oro), when Republic Act No. 8470 was ratified through a plebiscite.

During the 1988 local polls, Bernardo R. Rabanoz won the election and remained four terms in the office as mayor. In 1995 elections, Vice Mayor Salvador S. Jauod Sr. became the town's mayor and was reelected in the May 11, 1998 election.

== Geography ==
The municipality is bordered north by Monkayo; east by Compostela and Monkayo; south by Nabunturan; and west by Asuncion and New Corella, Davao del Norte.

=== Barangays ===
Montevista is politically subdivided into 20 barangays. Each barangay consists of puroks while some have sitios.

- Banagbanag
- Banglasan
- Bankerohan Norte
- Bankerohan Sur
- Camansi
- Camantangan
- Concepcion
- Dauman
- Canidkid
- Lebanon
- Linoan
- Mayaon
- New Calape
- New Dalaguete
- New Cebulan (Sambayon)
- New Visayas
- Prosperidad
- San Jose (Poblacion)
- San Vicente
- Tapia

=== Climate ===
Climate data for Montevista
Month	Jan	Feb	Mar	Apr	May	Jun	Jul	Aug	Sep	Oct	Nov	Dec	Year
Mean daily maximum °C (°F)	27 (81)	27 (81)	28 (82)	29 (84)	30 (86)	29 (84)	29 (84)	30 (86)	30 (86)	30 (86)	29 (84)	28 (82)	29 (84)
Mean daily minimum °C (°F)	23 (73)	23 (73)	23 (73)	23 (73)	24 (75)	24 (75)	24 (75)	24 (75)	24 (75)	24 (75)	24 (75)	23 (73)	24 (74)
Average precipitation mm (inches)	160 (6.3)	127 (5.0)	96 (3.8)	62 (2.4)	141 (5.6)	197 (7.8)	185 (7.3)	186 (7.3)	183 (7.2)	181 (7.1)	128 (5.0)	111 (4.4)	1,757 (69.2)
Average rainy days	20.0	17.2	15.9	13.9	23.8	27.2	28.1	28.2	27.0	27.0	21.3	18.7	268.3
Source: Meteoblue (modeled/calculated data, not measured locally)

== Demographics ==
Population census of Montevista
Year	Pop.	±% p.a.
1970	11,945	—
1980	20,626	+5.62%
1990	29,789	+3.74%
1995	31,905	+1.29%
2000	33,225	+0.87%
2007	35,192	+0.80%
2010	39,602	+4.39%
2015	43,706	+1.90%
2020	46,558	+1.34%
2024	46,581	+0.01%
Source: Philippine Statistics Authority

In the 2024 census, the population of Montevista was 46,581 people, with a density of 210 inhabitants per square kilometre or 540 inhabitants per square mile.

== Economy ==
Poverty incidence of Montevista (%)

Source: Philippine Statistics Authority
