= Asuncion, Davao del Norte =

Municipality in Davao del Norte, Philippines

Asuncion Saug
- Municipality
- Municipality of Asuncion
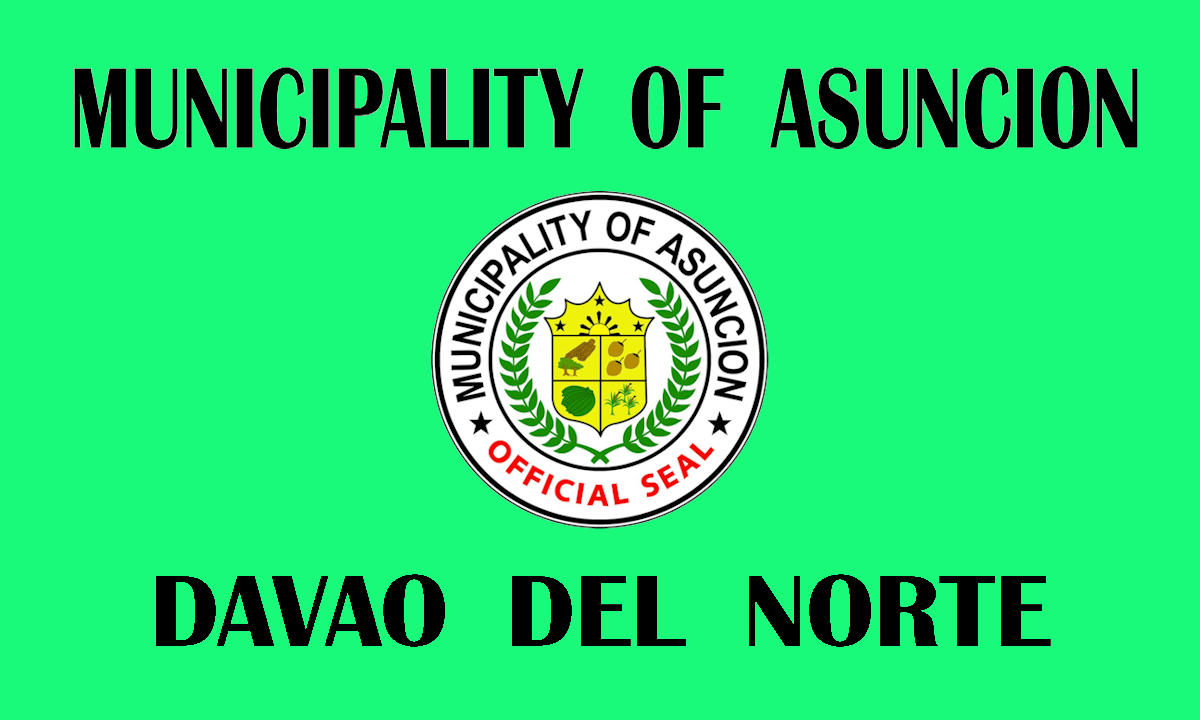
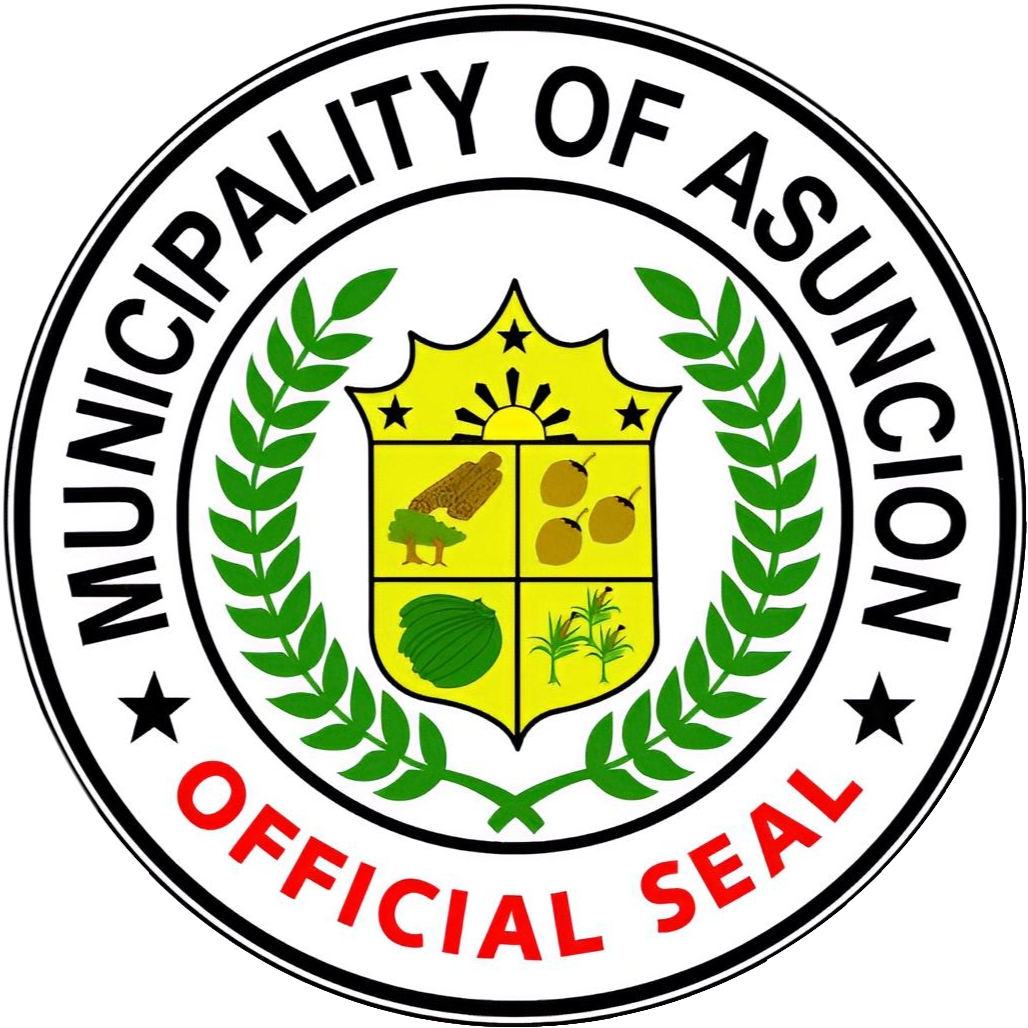
- Flag Seal
- Etymology: Our Lady of the Assumption
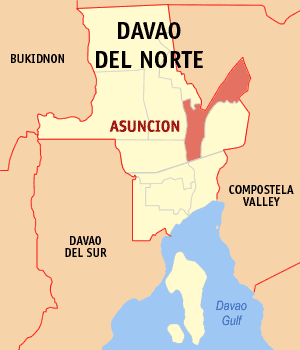
- Map of Davao del Norte with Asuncion highlighted
- Interactive map of Asuncion
- Location within the Philippines
- Coordinates: 7°32′19″N 125°45′03″E
- Country: Philippines
- Region: Davao Region
- Province: Davao del Norte
- District: 1st district
- Founded: August 1, 1948
- Barangays: 20 (see Barangays)

Government
  - Type: Sangguniang Bayan
  - Mayor: Eufracio P. Dayaday Jr.
  - Vice Mayor: Joel M. Camello
  - Representative: Pantaleon D. Alvarez
  - Municipal Council: Members: Angelito C. Laride; Reynaldo D. Panisal Jr.; Alvin S. Almeda Sr.; Silvino P. Matobato Jr.; Alan Q. Monteroso; Rocky Jay A. Binasbas; Rogelio E. Bual; Teofilo G. Dawa Sr.
  - Electorate: 42,484 voters (2025)

Area
  - Total: 297.39 km^{2} (114.82 sq mi)
- Elevation: 19 m (62 ft)
- Highest elevation: 60 m (200 ft)
- Lowest elevation: 9 m (30 ft)

Population (2024 census)
  - Total: 62,929
  - Density: 211.60/km^{2} (548.05/sq mi)
  - Households: 15,416
- Demonym(s): Asuncionista; Sauganon

Economy
  - Income class: 1st municipal income class
  - Poverty incidence: 16.92% (2023)
  - Revenue: ₱ 304.4 million (2024)
  - Assets: ₱ 869.3 million (2024)
  - Expenditure: ₱ 301.1 million (2024)
  - Liabilities: ₱ 401.8 million (2024)

Service provider
  - Electricity: Northern Davao Electric Cooperative (NORDECO)
- Time zone: UTC+8 (PST)
- ZIP code: 8102
- PSGC: 1102301000
- IDD : area code: +63 (0)84
- Native languages: Davawenyo; Cebuano; Ata Manobo; Kalagan; Tagalog mandaya, bisaya
- Website: www.adn.gov.ph

Asuncion, officially the Municipality of Asuncion (Cebuano: Lungsod sa Asuncion; Tagalog: Bayan ng Asuncion), is a municipality in the province of Davao del Norte, Philippines. According to the 2024 census, it has a population of 62,929 people.

== History ==
The municipality of New Leyte was established on August 1, 1948 by combining the municipal districts of Saug and Camansa, pursuant to Executive Order No. 156 as signed by President Elpidio Quirino. The same year in September 13, New Leyte was renamed to Saug pursuant to Executive Order No. 173 signed once again by President Quirino, after its largest settlement which used to be one of the two municipal districts before the merger. Finally, Saug was once more renamed as Asuncion, named after Our Lady of the Assumption, pursuant to Republic Act No. 1675 approved on June 20, 1957.

In 1955, the barrio (barangay) of New Sabonga was transferred to the town of Compostela.

On May 8, 1967, following the division of Davao, Asuncion became part of the new province of Davao del Norte.

In 2004, Barangays Igangon, Kipalili, Sabangan, Sawata, Santo Niño, and Mamangan were transferred to create what is now the municipality of Sawata.

== Geography ==
=== Climate ===
Climate data for Asuncion, Davao del Norte
Month	Jan	Feb	Mar	Apr	May	Jun	Jul	Aug	Sep	Oct	Nov	Dec	Year
Mean daily maximum °C (°F)	28 (82)	28 (82)	29 (84)	31 (88)	31 (88)	30 (86)	30 (86)	31 (88)	31 (88)	31 (88)	30 (86)	29 (84)	30 (86)
Mean daily minimum °C (°F)	22 (72)	22 (72)	22 (72)	22 (72)	23 (73)	24 (75)	23 (73)	23 (73)	23 (73)	23 (73)	23 (73)	23 (73)	23 (73)
Average precipitation mm (inches)	63 (2.5)	50 (2.0)	35 (1.4)	22 (0.9)	47 (1.9)	68 (2.7)	51 (2.0)	53 (2.1)	49 (1.9)	47 (1.9)	39 (1.5)	38 (1.5)	562 (22.3)
Average rainy days	15.0	12.6	10.4	8.2	18.8	22.5	21.2	20.5	20.3	20.3	14.4	11.7	195.9
Source: Meteoblue

=== Barangays ===
Asuncion is politically subdivided into 20 barangays. Each barangay consists of puroks while some have sitios.

Concepcion was elevated from being a sitio to a barrio in 1954. Del Pilar followed suit in 1957.

- Binancian
- Buan
- Buclad
- Cabaywa
- Camansa
- Camoning
- Canatan
- Concepcion
- Doña Andrea
- Magatos
- Napungas
- New Bantayan
- New Santiago
- Pamacaun
- Cambanogoy (Poblacion)
- Sagayen
- San Vicente
- Santa Filomena
- Sonlon
- New Loon

== Demographics ==
Population census of Asuncion
Year	Pop.	±% p.a.
1918	2,314	—
1939	6,465	+5.01%
1948	8,594	+3.21%
1960	23,653	+8.80%
1970	36,033	+4.29%
1975	66,102	+12.94%
1980	42,915	−8.27%
1990	54,954	+2.50%
1995	57,072	+0.71%
2000	60,383	+1.22%
2007	50,731	−2.37%
2010	55,844	+3.56%
2015	59,322	+1.16%
2020	61,893	+0.90%
2024	62,929	+0.40%
Source: Philippine Statistics Authority

== Economy ==
Poverty incidence of Asuncion

Source: Philippine Statistics Authority

== See also ==
- List of renamed cities and municipalities in the Philippines
