= Northern Davao Electric Cooperative =

Electric cooperative in Davao Region, Philippines

Northern Davao Electric Cooperative, Inc.
- Formerly: Davao del Norte Electric Cooperative, Inc. (DANECO)
- Type: Electric cooperative
- Industry: Electrical power industry
- Founded: September 24, 1971; 55 years ago in then-undivided Davao del Norte
- Fate: Ceased operations in Davao del Norte
- Headquarters: Montevista, Davao de Oro, Philippines
- Number of locations: 11 municipalities in Davao de Oro (2026)
- Areas served: Davao del Norte (until July 3, 2026); Davao de Oro
- Website: nordeco.ph

Northern Davao Electric Cooperative, Inc., also known as NORDECO, is an electric cooperative in the Philippines serving ~~most of Davao del Norte~~ (Note: The power needs of Braulio E. Dujali, Carmen, Panabo City and Santo Tomas are met by Davao Light and Power Company) and Davao de Oro.

== History ==
=== Origin ===
NORDECO was established as the Davao del Norte Electric Cooperative, Inc. or DANECO on September 24, 1971 initially providing electricity to parts of the then-undivided Davao del Norte.

=== 2010s intra-cooperative dispute and renaming ===
A conflict between two factions within the electric cooperative started in 2012 due to accusations of mismanagement with consumers confused whether to pay their bills with a faction linked with the National Electrification Administration or the faction registered with the Cooperative Development Authority. The National Electrification Administration assumed control over the electric cooperative on March 1, 2017 through the activation of Task Force Duterte Northern Davao Power that was created to resolve its legal woes. During the task force's management of the electric cooperative, bill payment collection improved and its system loss was reduced from twenty-three percent of its total supply to between 15 and 17 percent. The electric cooperative was renamed from Davao del Norte Electric Cooperative to Northern Davao Electric Cooperative in 2019 with the two factions reconciling in the same year.

=== Davao Light franchise expansion attempts ===
An attempt to expand the franchise area of the Davao Light and Power Company and subsequently replace NORDECO as the energy provider for Davao del Norte including the Island Garden City of Samal and Maco in Davao de Oro was initiated in 2020 when governor Edwin Jubahib of Davao del Norte along with its mayors delivered a letter to the cooperative's board requesting that they no longer be covered by the cooperative's service area. Such efforts were opposed by the Philippine Rural Electric Cooperatives Association as part of the latter's dissent against private entities aiming to expand the coverage of their respective franchises in areas already served by electric cooperatives. The attempted modification was approved during the 18th Congress but was vetoed by president Bongbong Marcos in July 2022 due to "legal and/or constitutional challenge due to the apparent overlap and possible infringement into the subsisting franchise, permits, and contracts previously granted to North Davao Electric Cooperative." The veto was lauded by the National Electrification Administration and the Philippine Rural Electric Cooperatives Association.

[House Bill] 6740, if enacted into law, is a major milestone for the province of Davao del Norte as the expansion of the energy services provided by Davao Light will bring about a positive change to the lives of our constituents, providing them with reliable and efficient power supply[.]

Edwin Jubahib, governor of Davao del Norte

The Constitution does not allow laws that impair contracts. With House Bills 5077, 6740, 6995, and 7047, existing contracts of NORDECO will be substantially impaired. For example, power supply contracts will be servicing a much smaller franchise area[.] If these HBs are passed it would create a disastrous precedent that can be abused. It encourages cutthroat behavior among competitors for the same franchise areas. Essentially, it overwrites the due process required by the EPIRA law to suspend or revoke franchise rights[.]

Jeorge Rapista, lawyer representing NORDECO

After the July 2022 veto, subsequent bills to displace NORDECO as the energy supplier in Davao del Norte and parts of Davao de Oro in favor of Davao Light were filed in the House of Representatives during the 19th Congress. Three such bills arranged for the expansion of Davao Light's franchise to parts of Davao del Norte currently served by NORDECO and Maco in Davao de Oro while one bill only limited the coverage of such changes to the Island Garden City of Samal. House Bill 6740, introduced by representative Margarita Nograles and co-sponsored by representatives John Tracy Cagas, Ferdinand Alexander Marcos and Jurdin Jesus Romualdo, is supported by Davao Del Norte governor Edwin Jubahib. However, NORDECO through its lawyer Jeorge Rapista contest the proposed changes to its franchise area and warned that such moves could lead to a constitutional crisis.

=== 2023 Davao del Norte outages ===
Areas in Davao de Oro under NORDECO's franchise were affected by recurring power interruptions in early 2023 with some residents and government officials of the Island Garden City of Samal commenting that such outages started in 2016 adversely affect tourism and drive away potential investors. Such outages among other grievances prompted some consumers in Tagum City to protest against the cooperative on March 13, 2023 with calls for NORDECO to be replaced by Davao Light.

=== Million peso electric bill ===
In early April 2024, a cooperative member from the Island Garden City of Samal complained on social media that the electricity bill that was received amounted to over 1 million pesos. NORDECO stated that the high electricity bill was due to a reading error by one of its personnel and appealed to its members to report such errors to its offices.

=== AboitizPower acquisition proposal ===
In October 2024, AboitizPower Distribution Utilities COO Anton Perdices mentioned that it was interested in the acquisition of NORDECO and estimated that between 700 million and 1 billion pesos would be spent to purchase its assets with the end goal of providing electricity at more affordable rates. Through a statement made by its acting general manager Elvera S. Alngog, NORDECO refuted the claims made by Mr. Perdices and described such declarations as malicious and defamatory.

=== Republic Act No. 12144 ===
In April 06, 2025, Republic Act No. 12144 lapsed into law, expanding the franchise of Davao Light and Power Company to include Tagum City, the Island Garden City of Samal, and several municipalities in Davao del Norte and Davao de Oro that had previously been served by the Northern Davao Electric Cooperative (Nordeco). The law lapsed into effect without the signature or veto of the President of the Philippines.

The Act inserted a new Section 21-A into Republic Act No. 11515, providing for a transition period of up to two years during which Nordeco may continue operating the existing distribution system in the affected areas while Davao Light establishes its facilities and secures the necessary approvals, including a provisional Certificate of Public Convenience and Necessity from the Energy Regulatory Commission.

Section 21-A also grants Davao Light the option to acquire Nordeco’s distribution assets in the affected areas at book value, with proceeds to be placed in escrow for the settlement of Nordeco’s financial obligations. The law further provides that qualified Nordeco employees shall be given preference in hiring for positions in the expanded franchise area.

=== Legal challenge ===
Nordeco filed petitions before the Supreme Court of the Philippines questioning the constitutionality of Republic Act No. 12144, arguing that the measure impaired its existing franchise rights and raised due process concerns.

In January 2026, the Supreme Court upheld the constitutionality of RA 12144 and dismissed the petitions seeking to nullify the law, allowing the expansion of Davao Light’s franchise to proceed.

=== Loss of Davao del Norte service areas ===
On July 3, 2026, NORDECO has ceased operations in Davao del Norte including Tagum, Samal and other municipalities in compliance with the cease and desist order from Energy Regulatory Commission in favor of Davao Light as a sole service provider. However, NORDECO continues serving Davao de Oro.
