= List of radio stations in the Davao Region =

Below is a list of radio stations in Davao Region in the Philippines, whose coverage is in part or whole of the same.

== Davao Occidental ==
=== FM Stations ===
Frequency	Name	Company	Format	Call Sign	Power	Covered Location
88.5 FM	Max FM Malita	Rizal Memorial Colleges Broadcasting Corporation (Christian Media Management)	News radio, Talk radio, Contemporary	DXED	3 KW	Malita
89.3 FM	Radyo ng Masa Malita	—N/a	Contemporary MOR, News, Talk	—N/a	5 KW	Malita
100.5 FM	Sky Radio Sta. Maria	Philippine Collective Media Corporation	Contemporary MOR, News/Talk	—N/a	5 KW	Sta. Maria
103.9 FM	Gold FM Malita	Kalayaan Broadcasting System, Inc.	News radio, Talk radio, Adult Contemporary	DXJB	5 KW	Malita
105.5 FM	Radyo Natin Malita	Radyo Natin Network	News, Public Service, Music	DXSA-FM	5 KW	Malita
107.7 FM	Brigada News FM Malita	Brigada Mass Media Corporation	Contemporary MOR, News, Talk	DXTU-FM	5 kW	Malita

== Davao Oriental ==
=== AM Stations ===
Frequency	Name	Company	Format	Call Sign	Power	Covered Location
549 AM	Radyo Totoo Mati	Roman Catholic Diocese of Mati	Religious radio, News, Talk	DXHM	10 KW	Mati, Davao Oriental

=== FM Stations ===
Frequency	Name	Company	Format	Call Sign	Power	Covered Location
88.1 FM	Happy Radio Banaybanay	Iddes Broadcast Group	Contemporary MOR, News, Talk	—N/a	5 kW	Banaybanay, Davao Oriental
88.5 FM	Nature's FM Mati	Rizal Memorial Colleges Broadcasting Corporation (operated by RSV Broadcasting Network)	Contemporary MOR, OPM, Talk	DXNZ	5 kW	Mati, Davao Oriental
89.5 FM	Frendz Radio	Hypersonic Broadcasting Center	Contemporary MOR, OPM	—N/a	5 kW	Cateel, Davao Oriental
90.3 FM	Dino Radio	PEC Broadcasting Corporation	Contemporary MOR, OPM	—N/a	5 kW	Mati, Davao Oriental
91.9 FM	Radyo Rapido Mati	Kalayaan Broadcasting System, Inc.	News, Public Affairs, Talk	DXWM	5 kW	Mati, Davao Oriental
92.5 FM	Radyo Birada	Iddes Broadcast Group	Contemporary MOR, News, Talk	DXGM	5 kW	San Isidro, Davao Oriental
92.9 FM	ABS FM Radio Mati	ABS Media Group	Contemporary MOR, News, Talk		5 kW	Mati, Davao Oriental
94.3 FM	Hope Radio Mati	Hope Channel Philippines	Religious Radio	DXMH	5 kW	Mati, Davao Oriental
95.1 FM	Radyo Bandera Mati	Palawan Broadcasting Corporation (operated by Bandera News Philippines)	Contemporary MOR, News, Talk	—N/a	5 kW	Mati, Davao Oriental
96.5 FM	RSO FM	—N/a	Contemporary MOR, News, Talk	—N/a	5 kW	Caraga, Davao Oriental
97.3 FM	Radyo Kalumonan	National Nutrition Council /Nutriskwela Community Radio & Davao Oriental State College of Science and Technology	Community Radio	DXNQ	0.5 KW	San Isidro, Davao Oriental
97.5 FM	Spirit FM Mati	Diocese of Mati (a member of the Catholic Media Network)	Catholic Radio, Music	DXDV	5 KW	Mati, Davao Oriental
98.3 FM	Prime FM Mati	Prime Broadcasting Network	Contemporary MOR, News, Talk	DXDH	5 kW	Mati, Davao Oriental
98.5 FM	Pagdayeg Idol FM	—N/a	Contemporary MOR, News, Talk	DXSJ	5 kW	Lupon, Davao Oriental
98.8 FM	Airstrike Radio	—N/a	Contemporary MOR, News, Talk	—N/a	5 kW	Mati, Davao Oriental
99.1 FM	XFM Mati	Subic Broadcasting Corporation (operated by Yes2Health Advertising, Inc.)	Contemporary MOR, News, Talk	—N/a	5 KW	Mati, Davao Oriental
99.7 FM	Madayaw FM	Kalayaan Broadcasting System, Inc.	Contemporary MOR, Talk	DXKH	5 kW	Baganga, Davao Oriental
100.5 FM	Radyo Natin Baganga	MBC Media Group	Community Radio	DXKE	5 KW	Baganga, Davao Oriental
100.5 FM	Rhythm FM	—N/a	Contemporary MOR, News, Talk	—N/a	5 kW	Banaybanay, Davao Oriental
100.7 FM	Esmael Radio Mati	ELT-ADZ Communication Services	News/Talk, Music	—N/a	5 kW	Mati, Davao Oriental
101.1 FM	Anchor Radio Baganga	—N/a	Religious	—N/a	5 kW	Baganga, Davao Oriental
101.3 FM	Radyo Natin Manay	MBC Media Group	Community Radio	DXRE	5 KW	Manay, Davao Oriental
103.1 FM	Brigada News FM Mati	Baycomms Broadcasting Corporation (Brigada Mass Media Corporation)	Contemporary MOR, News, Talk	DXBW	5 kW	Mati, Davao Oriental
104.1 FM	Kabanay FM	—N/a	Community Radio	—N/a	1 kW	Banaybanay, Davao Oriental
104.9 FM	Radyo Natin Governor Generoso	MBC Media Group	Community Radio	DXSB	5 KW	Governor Generoso, Davao Oriental
105.3 FM	Radyo Natin Mati	MBC Media Group	Community Radio	DXSI	5 KW	Mati, Davao Oriental
105.3 FM	Radyo Natin Lupon	MBC Media Group	Community Radio	DXSC	5 KW	Lupon, Davao Oriental
105.7 FM	Joy FM Caraga	Iddes Broadcast Group	Contemporary MOR, OPM, Talk	—N/a	5 kW	Caraga, Davao Oriental
106.3 FM	Juander Radyo Mati	Malindang Broadcasting Network Corporation (operated by RSV Broadcasting Network)	Contemporary MOR, News/Talk	—N/a	5 kW	Mati, Davao Oriental
107.9 FM	UR Infinite Radio	St. Jude Thaddeus Institute of Technology	News, Talk, Music	DXEV	5 KW	Mati, Davao Oriental

== Davao del Norte ==
=== AM Stations ===
Frequency	Name	Company	Format	Call Sign	Power	Covered Location
936 AM	Radyo ni Ga Tagum	UM Broadcasting Network	Music, News	DXDN	5 KW	Tagum City
1224 AM	Radyo Agila	Eagle Broadcasting Corporation	News, Public Affairs, Religious, Talk	DXED	10 KW	Tagum City

=== FM Stations ===
Frequency	Name	Company	Format	Call Sign	Power	Covered Location
88.9 FM	MON 88.9 Core Radio	Municipality Government of New Corella/Philippine Broadcasting Service	Music, News	DXNC	3KW	New Corella
89.5 FM	FMR DavNor (relay from Davao)	Philippine Collective Media Corporation	Contemporary MOR, News, Talk	DXON	5KW	Tagum
90.1 FM	Kasangga Radio	STCC Broadcasting Service	Community radio	—N/a	1 KW	Panabo City
90.9 FM	Lite FM Panabo	Christian Music Power	Music, News	DXPC	5KW	Panabo City
91.1 FM	Radio 911 DavNor	One DavNor Broadcasting Network	News, Public Affairs, Talk	DXNR	3.5 KW	Tagum City
92.5 FM	Radyo ni Ga Tagum	UM Broadcasting Network	News, Public Affairs, Talk	DXAV-FM	1 KW	Tagum City
92.9 FM	ABS FM Radio Tagum	—N/a	Community Radio	—N/a	1 KW	Tagum City
93.7 FM	JLC Radio	Jesus Loving Church Ministries	Religious radio	—N/a	1 kW	Tagum City
94.1 FM	Radyo Primera	Primer Broadcasting System	Contemporary MOR, News, Talk	DXPP	3 KW	Samal
94.3 FM	Dream Radio	—N/a	Community radio	—N/a	1 KW	Panabo City
94.5 FM	Big FM	St. Jude Thaddeus Institute of Technology	Contemporary MOR, News, Talk	—N/a	5 KW	Kapalong
95.1 FM	Energy FM Tagum	Ultrasonic Broadcasting System (operated by Herbz Med Pharma Corporation)	Contemporary MOR, OPM	DXKS	5 KW	Tagum City
96.1 FM	Infinite Radio	St. Jude Thaddeus Institute of Technology	Contemporary MOR, News, Talk	DXOD	5 KW	Panabo City
96.5 FM	Radyo Silangan Asya	Amapola Broadcasting System	Contemporary MOR, News, Talk	DXKP	1 KW	Kapalong
97.5 FM	Brigada News FM Tagum	Brigada Mass Media Corporation	Contemporary MOR, News, Talk	DXBY	5 kW	Tagum City
97.7 FM	Eagle’s Ministry Crusade FM	Eagle's Ministry Crusade	Christian radio	—N/a	5KW	New Corella
98.3 FM	Gold FM Tagum	Kalayaan Broadcasting System	Contemporary MOR, OPM	DXKN-FM	5 KW	Tagum City
99.1 FM	Radyo Tagum	—N/a	Music, News	—N/a	5 KW	Tagum City
99.3 FM	LCM FM	The Loud Cry Ministries Inc.	Religious radio	—N/a	5 KW	New Corella
99.9 FM	RPFM	Kaissar Broadcasting Network	Contemporary MOR, News, Talk	DXLT-FM	5 KW	Tagum City
100.7 FM	Juander Radyo Tagum	Rizal Memorial Colleges Broadcasting Corporation (operated by RSV Broadcasting Network)	Contemporary MOR, News/Talk	DXDE-FM	5 KW	Tagum City
100.9 FM	Metro FM	—N/a	Community radio	—N/a	1 KW	Sto. Tomas, Davao del Norte
102.3 FM	Prime FM Tagum	Prime Broadcasting Network	Music, News	—N/a	5 KW	Tagum City
102.9 FM	RD Double D FM	—N/a	Music, Talk	—N/a	1 KW	Talaingod
103.9 FM	Charm Radio Tagum	Polytechnic Foundation of Cotabato and Asia	Music, News	DXTO	5 KW	Tagum City
104.1 FM	DU30 Radio	Iddes Broadcast Group	Music, News	DXSD	5 KW	Sto. Tomas, Davao del Norte
105.7 FM	Happy FM	Subic Broadcasting Corporation	Contemporary MOR, OPM, News/Talk	DXXM	1 kW	Carmen
106.1 FM	Sure FM	Polytechnic Foundation of Cotabato and Asia (operated by Aces Broadcasting Corporation)	Contemporary MOR, OPM, Talk	—N/a	1 kW	Panabo
106.8 FM	Radyo sa Paglaum	Adventist Media	Religious radio	DXHS	5 KW	Tagum City
107.1 FM	XFM Tagum	Y2H Broadcasting Network	Contemporary MOR, News, Talk	—N/a	5 KW	Tagum City
107.9 FM	Radyo Natin Tagum	MBC Media Group	Community Radio	DXWG-FM	1 KW	Tagum City

== Davao del Sur ==
=== AM Stations ===
Frequency	Name	Company	Format	Call Sign	Power	Covered Location
1161 AM	Radyo ni Ga	UM Broadcasting Network	Music, News	DXDS	5 KW	Digos

=== FM Stations ===
Frequency	Name	Company	Format	Call Sign	Power	Covered Location
87.9 FM	Radyo Kidlat	Presidential Broadcast Service (operated by DASURECO)	Music, News	DXPL	5 KW	Digos
88.9 FM	T Radio Bansalan	—N/a	Soft AC, Talk	—N/a	1 KW	Bansalan
89.3 FM	Radyo ng Masa Digos	—N/a	Contemporary MOR, News, Talk	—N/a	5 KW	Digos
89.7 FM	Zap Radio	—N/a	Contemporary MOR, News, Talk	—N/a	5 KW	Digos
90.3 FM	Brigada News FM Digos (relay from Davao City)	Baycomms Broadcasting Corporation (Brigada Mass Media Corporation)	Contemporary MOR, News, Talk	DXGJ	1 kW	Digos
91.1 FM	Energy FM Digos	Ultrasonic Broadcasting System	Contemporary MOR, News, Talk	DXNW	5 kW	Digos
91.9 FM	Supreme FM Digos	Iddes Broadcast Group	Contemporary MOR, News, Talk	DXPM	5 kW	Digos
92.7 FM	Radyo ni Ga Digos	UM Broadcasting Network	Music, News	DXAY	2 KW	Digos
93.3 FM	Aksyon Teleradyo	—N/a	Contemporary MOR, News, Talk	—N/a	5 KW	Digos
93.5 FM	Bansalan FM	—N/a	Community radio	—N/a	1 KW	Bansalan
93.7 FM	Radyo Ronda Digos	—N/a	Contemporary MOR, News, Talk	—N/a	5 KW	Digos
94.3 FM	Charm Radio Digos	Polytechnic Foundation of Cotabato and Asia	Contemporary MOR, OPM	DXDA	5 kW	Digos
94.9 FM	Radyo Astig Kapatagan	—N/a	Contemporary MOR, News/Talk	—N/a	5 KW	Digos
95.1 FM	MyFM Radyo Sapul	—N/a	Music, News	—N/a	5 KW	Digos
95.9 FM	LCM FM Digos	The Loud Cry Ministries Inc.	Religious radio	—N/a	5 KW	Digos
96.1 FM	Sky Radio	Philippine Collective Media Corporation	Contemporary MOR, News/Talk	DXJF	5 KW	Hagonoy
96.7 FM	Muews Radio Sta. Cruz	Sagay Broadcasting Corporation	Contemporary MOR, News, Talk	DXSV	5 KW	Sta. Cruz
97.3 FM	Radyo Astig Digos	—N/a	Contemporary MOR, News, Talk	DXKL	5 KW	Digos
97.7 FM	DXPR FM	—N/a	Music, News	DXPR	5 KW	Sta. Cruz
98.3 FM	Gold FM Bansalan	Kalayaan Broadcasting System	Contemporary MOR, News, Talk	—N/a	1 KW	Bansalan
99.1 FM	Nonglading Radio	Rizal Memorial Colleges Broadcasting Corporation (operated by Nonglading Broadcasting Services)	Contemporary MOR, News, Talk	DXJC	5 kW	Digos
99.7 FM	Juander Radyo Digos	Malindang Broadcasting Network Corporation (operated by RSV Broadcasting Network)	Contemporary MOR, News/Talk	—N/a	5 KW	Digos
100.1 FM	Rock FM	—N/a	Music, News	—N/a	5 KW	Digos
101.1 FM	Alex Radio	—N/a	Community Radio	—N/a	1 kW	Digos
103.1 FM	Gold FM Digos	Kalayaan Broadcasting System	Contemporary MOR, News, Talk	DXKO	10 KW	Digos
104.9 FM	Radyo Ratsada	—N/a	Music, News	—N/a	5 KW	Digos
105.3 FM	Radyo Kastigo	—N/a	Music, News	—N/a	5 KW	Digos
106.3 FM	Prime FM	Prime Broadcasting Network	Contemporary MOR, News, Talk	DXDI	5 kW	Digos
106.7 FM	Radyo Digoseño	Interactive Broadcast Media	News, Public Affairs, Community Radio	DXET	10 kW	Digos
107.1 FM	Max FM Digos	Christian Media Management	News, Talk	DXHD	1 KW	Digos

== Davao de Oro ==
=== FM Stations ===
Frequency	Name	Company	Format	Call Sign	Power	Covered Location
87.7 FM	Magnificent FM	—N/a	Music, News	—N/a	1 KW	Mawab
88.1 FM	Happy Radio	Soundstream Broadcasting Corporation	Contemporary MOR, Talk	—N/a	5KW	Mawab
88.5 FM	Juander Radyo Nabunturan	Rizal Memorial Colleges Broadcasting Corporation (operated by RSV Broadcasting Network)	Contemporary MOR, News, Talk	DXBZ	5 kW	Nabunturan
89.3 FM	DXRG	—N/a	Community radio	—N/a	1KW	Mawab
90.3 FM	DXAC Power	—N/a	Music, Talk	—N/a	5KW	Compostela
90.3 FM	Double M FM	LGU of Maco	Music, News	—N/a	5KW	Maco
91.7 FM	Radyo de Oro	Provincial Government of Davao de Oro	Music, News	DXDO	1 KW	Nabunturan
92.1 FM	Max FM Davao de Oro	Rizal Memorial Colleges Broadcasting Corporation	Contemporary MOR, News, Talk	—N/a	5 KW	Nabunturan
95.7 FM	ABS FM Radio New Bataan	—N/a	Community Radio	—N/a	1 KW	New Bataan
95.7 FM	Radyo Asenso	Philippine Collective Media Corporation	Music, News	—N/a	5KW	Monkayo
96.7 FM	FMR Davao de Oro	Philippine Collective Media Corporation	Community Radio	—N/a	5 KW	Nabunturan
96.9 FM	T Radio	ELT ADZ and Communication Services	Soft AC, News, Talk	—N/a	5 KW	Mawab
97.3 FM	Radyo Amigo	Armed Forces of the Philippines	Music, News	—N/a	5KW	Mawab
98.1 FM	Gold FM	Kalayaan Broadcasting System	Music, News	—N/a	5KW	Compostela
98.9 FM	Radyo TriSi	—N/a	Community Radio,Religious Radio	—N/a	1KW	Maragusan
101.1 FM	Wave FM	—N/a	Contemporary MOR, News/Talk	—N/a	5KW	Compostela
101.3 FM	Radyo Kahimunan	National Nutrition Council /Nutriskwela Community Radio & Municipal Government of Laak	Community radio	DXNB	0.5 KW	Laak, Davao de Oro
101.3 FM	Radyo Bisyo	—N/a	Music, News	DXMA	5KW	Monkayo
102.5 FM	Lanog sa Maragusan	LGU of Maragusan	Community radio	DXLM	5KW	Maragusan
102.5 FM	ABS FM Radio Pantukan	—N/a	Community radio	—N/a	1KW	Pantukan
103.1 FM	DXPA	Andres Bonifacio College Broadcasting System	Music, News	DXPA	1 KW	Nabunturan
103.1 FM	Radyo Primera Pantukan	Primer Broadcasting System	Contemporary MOR, News, Talk	DX__	1 KW	Pantukan
104.7 FM	Radyo Natin Nabunturan	Radyo Natin Network	Music, News	DX__	0.5 KW	Nabunturan
106.9 FM	Radyo Birada	—N/a	Music, News	—N/a	10KW	Pantukan
107.3 FM	ABS FM Radio Montevista	—N/a	Contemporary MOR, News, Talk	DXYK	1 KW	Montevista
