= DXKO =

DXKO may refer to the following Philippine stations:

- DXKO-AM, an AM radio station broadcasting in Cagayan de Oro, branded as Radyo Ronda
- DXKO-FM, an FM radio station broadcasting in Digos, branded as Gold FM
- DXKO-TV, a TV station broadcasting in Cagayan de Oro, branded as RPTV Cagayan De Oro
