= 1233 AM =

AM radio frequency

The following radio stations broadcast on AM frequency 1233 kHz:

== Australia ==
- 2NC at Newcastle, New South Wales

== Italy ==
- This is Radio! The legendary AM

== Japan ==
- JOGR at Aomori
- JOUR at Nagasaki
- JOVL at Tanabeshirahama
- NHK Radio 1 from Osaka (Shin'onsen relay)

== Korea, People’s Republic ==
- KBS Radio 1 at Yeongyang (HLSQ) & Pyongchang

== New Zealand ==
- Today FM at Wellington

== Philippines ==
- DWRV-AM at Nueva Vizcaya and Quirino
- DYVS at Bacolod
- DZAU at Camarines Norte

== Thailand ==
- Thor. Or. 01
