= DXBZ =

DXBZ may refer to:

- DXBZ-AM, an AM radio station broadcasting in Pagadian, branded as Radyo Bagting
- DXBZ-FM, an FM radio station broadcasting in Nabunturan, branded as Juander Radyo
