= DXWM =

Philippine radio station

Radyo Rapido Mati (DXWM)
- Mati; Philippines
- Broadcast area: Davao Oriental, parts of Davao de Oro
- Frequency: 91.9 MHz
- Branding: DXWM 91.9 Radyo Rapido

Programming
- Languages: Cebuano, Filipino
- Format: News, Public Affairs, Talk
- Network: Radyo Rapido

Ownership
- Owner: Kalayaan Broadcasting System, Inc.

History
- First air date: 2008
- Former names: Sunrise Gold FM (2008-2015)

Technical information
- Licensing authority: NTC
- Power: 5,000 watts

DXWM (91.9 FM) Radyo Rapido is a radio station owned and operated by Kalayaan Broadcasting System, Inc. The studio is located in Capitol Hills, Mati, Davao Oriental.

It was formerly known as Sunrise FM from 2008 to 2015, when it transferred to 102.3 to give way for the launching of Radyo Rapido.
