= Muews Radio Tarlac =

Radio station in Tarlac, Philippines

Coordinates: 15°29′36.76″N 120°34′7.94″E

Tarlac City; Philippines
- Broadcast area: Tarlac and surrounding areas
- Frequency: 107.9 MHz
- Branding: 107.9 Muews Radio

Programming
- Format: Silent

Ownership
- Owner: Sagay Broadcasting Corporation

History
- First air date: 2014
- Last air date: 2019
- Former frequencies: 91.1 MHz (December 2018 - June 2019)

Technical information
- Licensing authority: NTC

107.9 Muews Radio (107.9 FM) was a radio station owned and operated by Sagay Broadcasting Corporation. The station's studios and transmitter were located along Romulo Ave., Brgy. San Vicente, Tarlac City.

The station used to occupy 91.1 FM from December 2018 to June 2019, when its contract with the frequency's owner was terminated. Since then, it continued its operations until it went off the air a couple of months later.
