= DXDN =

DXDN may refer to:

- DXDN-AM, an AM radio station broadcasting in Tagum
- DXDN-FM, an FM radio station broadcasting in Midsayap, branded as Max FM
