= DXKW =

DXKW may refer to:

- DXKW (Cotabato), an FM radio station broadcasting in Tulunan, branded as GNN FM
- DXKW (Dipolog), an FM radio station broadcasting in Dipolog, branded as Magik FM
