= DXRR-AM =

Radio station in Davao City, Philippines

Radyo Rapido Davao (DXRR)
Davao City; Philippines
- Broadcast area: Davao Region and surrounding areas
- Frequency: 1017 kHz
- Branding: Radyo Rapido Diyes Disisyete

Programming
- Languages: Cebuano, Filipino
- Format: News, Public Affairs, Talk
- Network: Radyo Rapido

Ownership
- Owner: Kalayaan Broadcasting System, Inc.

History
- First air date: 1960
- Former call signs: DXGE (1960–1987)
- Former frequencies: 980 kHz (1967–1978)
- Call sign meaning: Radyo Rapido

Technical information
- Licensing authority: NTC
- Power: 10,000 watts

DXRR (1017 AM) Radyo Rapido is a radio station owned and operated by Kalayaan Broadcasting System, Inc., a subsidiary of ANFLOCOR Group of Companies. The station's studio is located at DAMOSA Gateway, J.P Laurel Ave. cor. Mamay Rd., Davao City, and its transmitter is located at Bugac, Brgy. Ma-a, Davao City.

== History ==
The station was founded in 1960 as DXGE. At that time, it was owned by Liberty Broadcasting Corporation. Tony Vergara, Jimmy Torres and Fred Colas were among the notable personalities of the station. In 1988, the then-newly inaugurated Kalayaan Broadcasting System acquired the station and changed to its current callsign. Its transmitter was formerly located at Malacanang Munong.
