= Polytechnic Foundation of Cotabato and Asia =

Philippine radio network

Polytechnic Foundation of Cotabato and Asia, Inc.
- Type: Private
- Industry: Broadcast
- Founded: 2001
- Key people: Atty. Baltazar A. Sator President

Polytechnic Foundation of Cotabato and Asia, Inc. is a Philippine radio network. Its main office is located at Datu Icdang St. cor. Quezon Blvd., Kidapawan. PCFAI operates a number of stations across places in the country under the Charm Radio brand.

== PFCAI Stations ==
=== AM Stations ===
Branding	Callsign	Frequency	Location
Radyo Bantayog	DZAU	1233 kHz	Talisay

=== FM Stations ===
Branding	Callsign	Frequency	Location
Radyo Bantayog	—N/a	91.3 MHz	Talisay
Charm Radio Tagum	DXTO	103.9 MHz	Tagum
Charm Radio Digos	DXDA	94.3 MHz	Digos
Charm Radio Kidapawan	DXCH	90.3 MHz	Kidapawan
Charm Radio Arakan	DXAG	93.3 MHz	Arakan
Wow Radio	—N/a	104.1 MHz	Midsayap
RCFM Sindangan	DXSZ	97.7 MHz	Sindangan
