= Wow Radio (Midsayap) =

Radio station in North Cotabato, Philippines

Midsayap; Philippines
- Broadcast area: Northern Maguindanao, Western Cotabato
- Frequency: 104.1 MHz
- Branding: Wow Radio 104.1

Programming
- Language: Cebuano
- Format: Contemporary MOR, News, Talk

Ownership
- Owner: Polytechnic Foundation of Cotabato and Asia

History
- First air date: July 12, 2003

Technical information
- Licensing authority: NTC
- Power: 5,000 watts

Wow Radio 104.1 (104.1 FM) is an FM station owned and operated by Polytechnic Foundation of Cotabato and Asia. The station's studio is located along Sto. Niño St., Brgy. Poblacion 1, Midsayap.

Last August 7, 2013, a blast occurred near the building where the station is located.
