= DXCH =

Philippine radio station

DXCH (Charm Radio Kidapawan)
Kidapawan; Philippines
- Broadcast area: Eastern Cotabato and surrounding areas
- Frequency: 90.3 MHz
- Branding: 90.3 Charm Radio

Programming
- Languages: Cebuano, Filipino
- Format: Contemporary MOR, OPM, Talk
- Network: Charm Radio

Ownership
- Owner: Polytechnic Foundation of Cotabato and Asia

History
- First air date: 2002
- Former call signs: DXCA (as of 2010)
- Call sign meaning: CHarm

Technical information
- Licensing authority: NTC
- Power: 5,000 watts

DXCH (90.3 FM), broadcasting as 90.3 Charm Radio, is a radio station owned and operated by the Polytechnic Foundation of Cotabato & Asia. The station's studio and Transmitter are located along Datu Icdang St. cor. Quezon Blvd., Kidapawan.
