= DXDA-FM =

Radio station in Digos, Philippines

Charm Radio Digos (DXDA)
Digos; Philippines
- Broadcast area: Davao del Sur, parts of Davao City
- Frequency: 94.3 MHz
- Branding: 94.3 Charm Radio

Programming
- Languages: Cebuano, Filipino
- Format: Contemporary MOR, OPM
- Network: Charm Radio

Ownership
- Owner: Polytechnic Foundation of Cotabato and Asia

History
- First air date: 2008

Technical information
- Licensing authority: NTC
- Power: 5,000 watts

Links
- Website: Official Website

DXDA (94.3 FM), broadcasting as 94.3 Charm Radio, is a radio station owned and operated by the Polytechnic Foundation of Cotabato and Asia. The station's studio is located at the 3rd Floor, Cagas Bldg., Rizal Ave., Digos.
