= DXLK =

Radio station in General Santos, Philippines

One Life Radio (DXLK)
General Santos; Philippines
- Broadcast area: South Cotabato, Sarangani and surrounding areas
- Frequency: 103.9 MHz
- Branding: GFM 103.9 One Life Radio

Programming
- Languages: English, Filipino, Cebuano
- Format: Christian radio

Ownership
- Owner: Kalayaan Broadcasting System
- Operator: One Life Ministries

History
- First air date: 2010
- Former call signs: DXWW (2010–2013)
- Former names: Mango Radio (2010-2013); Gold FM (2013-2020)
- Call sign meaning: Inverted as Kalayaan

Technical information
- Power: 3,000 Watts

DXLK (103.9 FM), broadcasting as GFM 103.9 One Life Radio, is a radio station owned by Kalayaan Broadcasting System and operated by One Life Ministries. The station's studio is located in Del Valle Village, Purok Kauswagan, Brgy. Apopong, General Santos.

== History ==
The station went on air in 2010 as part of the Mango Radio network. In 2013, One Accord Mass Media Management took over the station's operations and rebranded it as Gold FM. In 2020, One Life Ministries took over the station's operations and rebranded it as One Life Radio
