= DWKV =

Infinite Radio Batangas (DWKV)
- Lipa; Philippines
- Broadcast area: Batangas and surrounding areas
- Frequency: 102.3 MHz
- Branding: 102.3 Infinite Radio

Programming
- Language: Filipino
- Format: Contemporary MOR, News, Talk
- Network: Infinite Radio

Ownership
- Owner: St. Jude Thaddeus Institute of Technology

History
- First air date: December 22, 2010
- Former names: Citibeat (December 22, 2010-March 15, 2023)

Technical information
- Licensing authority: NTC
- Power: 5,000 watts
- Transmitter coordinates: 13°56′33″N 121°09′08″E

DWKV (102.3 FM), broadcasting as 102.3 Infinite Radio, is a radio station owned and operated by St. Jude Thaddeus Institute of Technology. The station's studio and transmitter are located at the 2nd Flr., EMC Building, P. Laygo St, Lipa, Batangas.

Its transmitter antenna is heavily directional to eastern Batangas in order to protect the signal of Lemery-based Radyo Natin, broadcasting 25 km southwest of Lipa.

== History ==
CitiBeat logo

The station first went on the air on December 22, 2010 as CitiBeat 102.3 FM under the ownership of Kaissar Broadcasting Network, months after the demise of Lipa's sole radio station D'Best 98.5. At that time, the station was housed at the 3rd floor of the JR Business Complex in Brgy. Mataas na Lupa. Among its inaugural personalities were Ron Lozano (now with DWIZ), Zeus Corneja (now-deceased), Cristina Parrientes, and Amor Santiago (now with 98.5 Cool FM).

On its first months of operation, some radio stations in the market took umbrage at CitiBeat's signal feed spreading out to their frequencies within the city. By 2013, the problem has been resolved, but the offset issues still persisted near the station complex as its signals occupy 102.5 FM and 103.1 FM on some hotspots.

In March 2012, the station launched its first singing contest for radio, branded as Radyo Istariray, which featured aspiring singers who vied for prizes from station sponsors. However, by June 2012, sponsorship issues forced the station to shelve the contest, after its first mall show with the contestants' entries went unnoticed by the station.

On March 15, 2023, CitiBeat signed off the air for the last time. By this time, St. Jude Thaddeus Institute of Technology acquired the frequency. Radyo Natin Lemery was heard on this frequency during the meantime.

In April 2023, the station returned on air, this time as Tricab Infinite Radio under the management of Lipa-based Tricab Media Production.

In May 2025, the station rebranded as simply Infinite Radio as SJTIT took over the station's entire operations.
