= DXKA =

Radio station in Butuan, Philippines

Infinite Radio Butuan (DXKA)
- Butuan; Philippines
- Broadcast area: Agusan del Norte and surrounding areas
- Frequency: 90.1 MHz
- Branding: 90.1 Nonglading Infinite Radio

Programming
- Languages: Cebuano, Filipino
- Format: Contemporary MOR, News, Talk
- Network: Infinite Radio; Nonglading Radio

Ownership
- Owner: St. Jude Thaddeus Institute of Technology
- Operator: Nonglading Broadcasting Services

History
- First air date: January 31, 2014
- Former names: KA90/KA 90.1; Radyo Kaibigan; Power Radio; Mark FM
- Call sign meaning: Kaissar (former owner)

Technical information
- Licensing authority: NTC
- Power: 5 kW

DXKA (90.1 FM), broadcasting as 90.1 Nonglading Infinite Radio, is a radio station owned by St. Jude Thaddeus Institute of Technology and operated by Nonglading Broadcasting Services. The station's studio is located at the 3rd Floor, Cebu CFI Community Cooperative Building, Ochoa Ave. cor. New Rd., Butuan, and its transmitter is located atop Mt. Mayapay, Brgy. Bonbon, Butuan.

== History ==
The station first went on air on January 31, 2014 under the ownership of Kaissar Broadcasting Network. It was known as KA90 with a Soft AC format. At that time, its studios were located along Jose C. Aquino Ave. near the Police Regional Office XIII Headquarters. It went off the air sometime around late 2016.

In January 2019, it went back on air, this time airing a mix of music, news and talk; Also they use frankencuts for their jingles. In August 2020, it rebranded as Radyo Kaibigan. In February 2021, it rebranded as Power Radio and transferred to Ochoa St. in Brgy. Limaha. In 2023, it rebranded as Mark FM. It went off the air sometime in 2024.

In 2025, St. Jude Thaddeus Institute of Technology acquired the frequency. On May 1, 2026, it went on the air as Nonglading Infinite Radio under the management of Nonglading Broadcasting Services.
