= DYIP =

Infinite Radio Calbayog (DYIP)
Calbayog; Philippines
- Broadcast area: Northwestern Samar
- Frequency: 92.1 MHz
- Branding: 92.1 Infinite Radio

Programming
- Languages: Waray, Filipino
- Format: Contemporary MOR, OPM
- Network: Infinite Radio

Ownership
- Owner: St. Jude Thaddeus Institute of Technology

History
- First air date: February 4, 2021

Technical information
- Licensing authority: NTC
- Power: 5,000 watts

Links
- Website: Website

DYIP (92.1 FM), broadcasting as 92.1 Infinite Radio, is a radio station owned and operated by St. Jude Thaddeus Institute of Technology. The station's studio is located at the 4th floor, Acaso Bldg., Brgy. Payahan, Calbayog.
