= Mount Diwata =

Volcanic mountain range in Mindanao, Philippines

- Diwalwal; Mount Diwalwal; Mount Dewata
- Location within Mindanao mainland Location within Philippines

Highest point
- Elevation: 1,261 m (4,137 ft)
- Coordinates: 7°49′26″N 126°06′38″E

Geography
- Country: Philippines
- Region: Davao Region
- Province: Davao de Oro; Davao Oriental
- City/municipality: Monkayo; Cateel; Boston

Geology
- Mountain type: Stratovolcano

Climbing
- First ascent: Unknown

Mount Diwata, colloquially nicknamed as Diwalwal, is a remote 1,261-metre (4,137 ft) high range of volcanic mountain and biodiversity area in Davao Region in the eastern part of Mindanao island of Philippines. Rich in gold and copper ores and mines, it is spread across the 3 municipalities: (a) Monkayo in the province of Davao de Oro; as well as (b) Cateel and (c) Boston in the province of Davao Oriental. Laguna Copperplate Inscription, the oldest written document in Philippines dated to 900 CE, refers to Mount Diwata.

It is a host to multiple high–grade epithermal gold vein systems and porphyry copper deposits. Mount Diwata is now officially a barangay of Monkayo, with an estimated population of 12,000 to 20,000 in 2015, mainly in shanty towns of miners and their families including 1,000 female miners. It is located 160 km from Davao Airport, 80 km from Tagum City, 135 km from Hinatuan, Surigao del Sur, 185 km from Butuan, 255 km from Malaybalay, 300 km from Surigao City airport and 363 km from Cagayan de Oro airport.

== Etymology ==
The mountain is named after the diwata (deity or "enchanting goddess"), which is the pre-Spanish native faith based on the Indianized concept of devata in Hinduism in Indosphere. Its local nickname "diwalwal" is derived from the native idiom "diwalwal ang dila" ("one's tongue hanging out"}.

=== Legend ===
According to the oral tradition, a king of this area fell in love, married a poor but beautiful and brave woman named "Diwata". She fought the enemies of the kingdom and she was killed fighting in one such battle while she was pregnant. The king named her mountain burial place "Diwata" after his beloved martyred wife. Over time the villagers started to perceive that the shape of mountain range resembled a pregnant woman, and the name of mountain range where she was buried also came to be known as the "Mount Diwata". As the native protective ancestor, "Diwata", she is considered the guardian angel/goddess of this mountain range, rivers and ecology.

== History ==
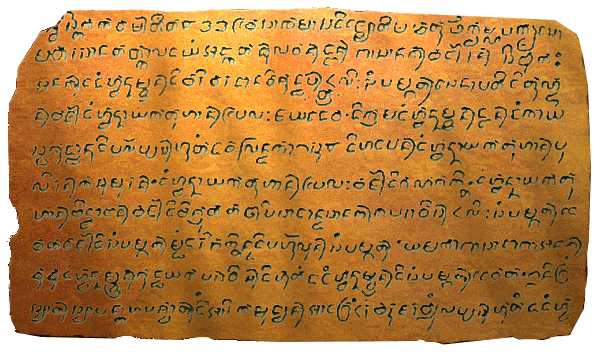
The Laguna Copperplate Inscription (key) is inscribed with small writing hammered into its surface. It shows heavy Indian cultural influence (by way of Srivijaya) present in the Philippines prior to European colonization in the 16th century.

The Laguna Copperplate Inscription (Inskripsyon sa Binatbat na Tanso ng Laguna), dated to 900 CE, which refers to Mount Diwata. The inscription is a legal document inscribed on a copper plate in 900 CE, is the earliest known written document found in the Philippines. Inscription mentions that the "Jayadewa" of Tondo is invoking the authority of the "Chief of Dewata" as P. Patanñe notes:

"This relationship is unclear but a possible explanation is that the chief of Dewata wanted it to be known that he had a royal connection in Java.”

Scholars after Postma, such as Patanñe (1996) and Abinales and Amoroso (2005) have come to identify the Dewata of the inscription as a settlement in or near “present-day Mount Diwata, near Butuan”.

=== Gold discovery and mining rush ===
In September 1983, gold was discovered by a Lumad in the creeks of Mount Diwata, leading to a gold rush causing the population to rise rapidly to 125,000, who were mostly miners living in shanties along the 2 km logging road where the gold mine valcanoic veins are located. On November 25, 2002, due to the unsafe and lethal illegal mining and siltation of Naboc River, the government declared 8,100 hectares area of Mount Diwalwal across Agusan-Davao-Surigao a "Mineral Reservation" via the Proclamation No. 297. Mining was taken over by the government owned corporation. Mining prospects include high grade ores in Balite and Buenas-Tinago vein systems.

== Biodiversity ==
According to BirdLife International, Mount Diwata Important Bird Area (IBA) is the forested area at the southern end of the Diwata range to the south of Mount Hilong-Hilong with highest peak rising to 1,261m and several lower slopes which habit many threatened and restricted species of the Mindanao and Eastern Visayas Endemic Bird Area. The threatened species of birds in Mount Diwata range are Philippine Eagle (Pithecophaga jefferyi), Mindanao Bleeding-heart (Gallicolumba criniger), Philippine Kingfisher (Ceyxme lanurus), Blue-capped Kingfisher (Actenoides hombroni), Wattled Broadbill (Eurylaimus steeri) Philippine leafbird (Chloropsis flavipensis), White Lauan (Shorea contorta), Red Lauan (Shorea negronensis), Mangkono (Xanthostemon verdugonianus), Yakal (Shorea astylosa), Bagtikan (Parashorea plicata), Tangili (Shorea polysperma).

== Tourism ==
The mountain range has numerous waterfalls of which 34 waterfalls, 4 hot springs, 14 caves, 34 lakes and one campsite "Datu Lipus Macapandong Eco-Tourism Park" in the area of the range falling in the Agusan del Sur province (excluding waterfalls and caves falling in the area of Davao de Oro province). One of the popular fall is Bega fall, which is accessible from Agusan del Sur side.

"Datu Lipus Macapandong Eco-Tourism Park", a Boys Scout camping site, near the natural water pool of the waterfall which also offers the nice view of various summits. There are several peaks, each of which can be ascended through several different routes, through the palm oil forests on the lower and coconut trees on the higher mountain slopes, ridges, meadows, butterfly infested rattan and Romblon and rattan forests (used for making banig mats). Governor of Agusan del Sur had built the "Stairway to Heaven" consisting of concrete stairs and resting shelters for climbers. San Francisco Mountaineering Club (SFMC) in the nearby town of San Francisco organises mountaineering trips for the members.

The mountain range has the 20 m high multi-tiered Awao waterfalls on Monkayo side on black canyon with a natural swimming pool, and a garden and kiosks nearby. Its higher tier is relatively harder to climb but still accessible. The fall can be reached from the Monkayo town by a habal-habal (motorl cycle taxi) and then a gradually ascending trek over the rivers and creeks.

== Environmental concerns ==
Illegal and unsafe mining practices have resulted in pollution of water, mercury poisoning, silting of Noboc river, human deaths, and destruction of flora and fauna. Thousands of miners, including children, are at risk of air and water pollution and mercury poisoning.

== See also ==
- Greater India
- Indosphere
- Hinduism in Philippines
- List of India-related topics in the Philippines
- List of active volcanoes in the Philippines
- List of inactive volcanoes in the Philippines
