= DXSZ =

Radio station in Zamboanga del Norte, Philippines

Charm Radio Sindangan (DXSZ)
- Sindangan; Philippines
- Broadcast area: Eastern Zamboanga del Norte
- Frequency: 97.7 MHz
- Branding: 97.7 Charm Radio

Programming
- Languages: Cebuano, Filipino
- Format: Contemporary MOR, OPM
- Network: Charm Radio

Ownership
- Owner: Polytechnic Foundation of Cotabato and Asia

History
- First air date: 2012
- Call sign meaning: Sindangan, Zamboanga

Technical information
- Licensing authority: NTC
- Power: 5 kW

97.7 Charm Radio (DXSZ 97.7 MHz) is an FM station owned and operated by Polytechnic Foundation of Cotabato and Asia. Its studios and transmitter are located at Brgy. Ramon Magsaysay, Sindangan.
