= DXWS =

Vibe Radio (DXWS)
- Malaybalay; Philippines
- Broadcast area: Bukidnon and surrounding areas
- Frequency: 105.3 MHz
- Branding: Vibe Radio 105.3

Programming
- Languages: Cebuano, Filipino
- Format: Contemporary MOR, News, Talk

Ownership
- Owner: Kalayaan Broadcasting System
- Operator: Reaching Out There Development Corporation

History
- First air date: 2008
- Former names: Praise Radio (2008-2020)
- Call sign meaning: Worship

Technical information
- Licensing authority: NTC
- Power: 5,000 watts

DXWS (105.3 FM), broadcasting as Vibe Radio 105.3, is a radio station owned by Kalayaan Broadcasting System and operated by Reaching Out There Development Corporation. Its studios and transmitter are located along Sayre Highway, Purok 3, Brgy. San Jose, Malaybalay.

== History ==
The frequency first went on air in 2008 as Praise Radio. It aired a christian radio format. During its existence, the frequency was under MIT Radio TV Network. It went off the air sometime in 2020, and its equipment was sold the following year.

In early 2026, it went back on air, this time as Vibe Radio under the management of Reaching Out There Development Corporation. The staff consisted of former broadcasters of the regional FM Radio 105.1, which went off the air two weeks prior. By this time, the frequency was under Kalayaan Broadcasting System.
