= DXLG =

Gold FM Valencia
Valencia; Philippines
- Broadcast area: Bukidnon
- Frequency: 98.5 MHz
- Branding: 98.5 Gold FM Radyo Kaibigan

Programming
- Languages: Cebuano, Filipino
- Format: Contemporary MOR, News, Talk
- Network: Gold FM

Ownership
- Owner: Kalayaan Broadcasting System
- Operator: Kaibigan Brotherhood Association of Bukidnon

Technical information
- Licensing authority: NTC
- Power: 5 kW

98.5 Gold FM Radyo Kaibigan (DXLG 98.5 MHz) is an FM station owned by Kalayaan Broadcasting System and operated by Kaibigan Brotherhood Association of Bukidnon. Its studios and transmitter are located at Valencia, Bukidnon.
