= DXAA =

Radio station in Zamboanga del Norte, Philippines

- Dipolog; Philippines
- Broadcast area: Northern Zamboanga del Norte and surrounding areas
- Frequency: 92.5 MHz
- Branding: DXAA 92.5

Programming
- Languages: Cebuano, Filipino, English
- Format: College Radio

Ownership
- Owner: Andres Bonifacio College Broadcasting System

History
- First air date: May 25, 1997
- Call sign meaning: Amando Amatong

Technical information
- Licensing authority: NTC
- Power: 5,000 watts

DXAA (92.5 FM) is a radio station owned and operated by Andres Bonifacio College Broadcasting System. The station's studio and transmitter are located at the 3/F Amando B. Amatong Civic Center, College Park, Dipolog.

== Incidents and controversies ==
- On May 3, 2005, DXAA personality Klein Cantoneros was shot in an ambush in Santa Filomena, leading to his death the next day.
