= Digos City National High School =

Public high school in Davao del Sur, Philippines

Location
- Rizal Avenue, Zone II, Digos; Philippines; 6°45′02″N 125°21′25″E

Information
- Type: Public
- Motto: Patungo sa Kaunlaran
- Established: August 1946
- Principal: Elizabeth Rollan Bueron
- Grades: 7 to 12
- Colors: Blue and white
- Nickname: Digos City High, DiCNHS, National
- Website: Digos City National High School

Digos City National High School (DiCNHS), formerly known as Davao del Sur National High School, is situated at Rizal Avenue, Zone II, Digos, is one of the biggest schools in Davao Region, under the jurisdiction of the DepEd Division of Digos. Digos City National High School is also once the second largest secondary school in the country in terms of student population, second only to Rizal National High School in Pasig. Founded in August 1946 with the name of Digos Junior High school.

== History ==
Digos City National High School (DICNHS) was founded in August, 1946. It was originally named Digos Junior High School. It started with just two humble nipa huts at Rizal Avenue, Digos, Davao del Sur. The school principal, then, was the late Crispin Tolentino. There were only nine teachers to help him guide the 250 students from 1946 to 1967. Two years later, the name was changed to Digos Provincial High School.

From 1968 to 1975, the school principal was the late Federico Alferez. The school had 4,760 students, 249 teachers and employees. After twenty-nine years of hard work, perseverance and determination on the part of the administrator, the enrollment tremendously increase and later the name of the school was changed to Davao del Sur National High School specifically in 1970. At that time, there was an assistant principal, 8 department heads and guidance coordinator.

Mr. Ramon C. Presto became the school principal from 1976 to 1997 with 7,118 students, 252 teachers and seventeen employees until he died in 1997. Mr. Alfonso G. Gomez, Jr., CESO V, Schools Division Superintendent of Davao del Sur took over and acted as officer-in-charge of the school from 1997 to August 12, 1998, with 7,973 students, 252 teachers and 17 employees.

On August 13, 1998, Dr. Concepcion R. Cadungog, former education supervisor in mathematics and assistant to the schools division superintendent, Division of Davao del Sur took over from Mr. Alfonso G. Gomez, Jr. as Secondary School Principal IV with 12,110 students, 263 teachers and 18 employees.

Digos City Ordinance No. 05- II changed the name of Davao del Sur National High School into Digos City National High School last November 10, 2005. The ordinance is known as the Digos City National High Ordinance authored by City Councilor Josef F. Cagas and City Councilor Atty. Vic P. Cadungog, co-authored by all members of the Sangguniang Panlungsod of Digos attested by then Vice-Mayor Atty. Joseph Peňas and approved by the then Digos Mayor, Atty. Arsenio A. Latasa.

== Academic programs ==
=== Basic education curriculum ===
This is a regular curriculum with special features for students whose needs are preparation for higher learning and gainful employment.

The four year curriculum builds on Basic Education Curriculum (BEC) with Technical vocational Education (TLE) as the core of the program. Opportunities for students to "earn-while-you-learn" shall be explored in this program. The use of Information and Communication Technology (ICT) to enhance teaching and learning shall be encouraged.

The BEC also provides special classes/sections for students whose final grades are not less than 85%, called Pilot classes.

Subjects taken by the students in the General Curriculum:

Subjects	Grade 7	Grade 8	Grade 9	Grade 10
Science	General Science	Biology	Chemistry	Physics
Mathematics	Elementary Algebra	Intermediate Algebra	Geometry	Advanced Algebra, Trigonometry, Statistics
English	Grammar and Philippine Literature	Grammar and Afro-Asian Literature	Grammar and American Literature	Grammar and World Literature
Filipino	Pag-unawa	Gramatika	Panitikang Pilipino	Panitikang Asyano
Social Studies (AP)	Philippine History and Government	Asian History	World History	Economics
Music, Arts, Physical Education & Health (MAPEH)	Music, Arts, Physical Education & Health 7	Music, Arts, Physical Education & Health 8	Music, Arts, Physical Education & Health 9	Music, Arts, Physical Education & Health 10, Citizenship Advancement Training I (CAT I)
Technology and Livelihood Education	Agriculture, Home Economics, Drafting and Entrepreneurship	Agriculture, Home Economics, Drafting and Entrepreneurship	Agriculture, Baking, Electronics, Dressmaking, Cosmetology, Entrepreneurship and Drafting	Basic Computer Literacy, Agriculture, Culinary arts, Electronics, Entrepreneurship, Home Economics, Cosmetology, Baking, Drafting and Dressmaking
Values (EPP)	Values Education (Sarili)	Values Education (Kapwa)	Values Education (Lipunan)	Values Education (Diyos)

=== Science Technology Engineering and Mathematics (STEM) ===
The program has an enriched Science, Mathematics and English curriculum in addition to the standard requirements of the secondary education curriculum.

It provides additional enrichment material for Science and Technology, Mathematics and Earth Science.

Incoming first year students in Science Network Classes are required to pass OLSAT Aptitude and Ability Test and Personality Test.

They must maintain a final grade of not less than 80% in all subjects.

Subjects taken by ESEP students:

Subjects	Grade 7	Grade 8	Grade 9	Grade 10
Science	General Science	Biology	Chemistry	Advanced Physics
Mathematics	Elementary Algebra	Intermediate Algebra	Advanced Algebra	Trigonometry, Precalculus & Calculus
English	Grammar and Philippine Literature	Grammar and Afro-Asian Literature	Grammar and Anglo-American Literature	Grammar and World Literature
Filipino	Pag-unawa	Gramatika	Panitikang Pilipino	Panitikang Asyano
Social Studies (AP)	Asian History	World History	Economics	Social Studies
Music, Arts, Physical Education & Health (MAPEH)	Music, Arts, Physical Education & Health 7	Music, Arts, Physical Education & Health 8	Music, Arts, Physical Education & Health 9	Music, Arts, Physical Education & Health 10, Citizenship Advancement Training I (CAT I)
Values (EP)	Values Education (Sarili)	Values Education (Kapwa)	Values Education (Lipunan)	Values Education (Diyos)
Technology and Livelihood Education	Basic Computer Education; Computer History; Computer Basics; Microsoft Word, Excel & PowerPoint literacy	Intermediate Computer Education (Photo Editing; HTML Website creation; Desktop Publishing)	Advanced Computer Education (Website creation and management; Photo Editing; Bookkeeping)	Advanced Electronics
Science electives	Research I, Computer Science	Research II, Biotechnology, Computer Science	Basic Physics, Applied Chemistry, Research III, Electricity	Advanced Chemistry, Research IV, Pre-Cal
Math electives	Elementary Algebra	Advanced Geometry	Trigonometry	Calculus

=== Special Program in the Arts (SPA) ===
The nationwide program provides special curriculum offerings for the development of talents and interest in visual arts, creative writing in English and Filipino, music, theatre arts, dance arts in addition to the standard requirements of the secondary education curriculum.

SPA's objective is to develop students with special inclination to music, visual arts, theatre arts, creative writing, media arts and dance, and to preserve Filipino culture and heritage.

=== Special Education (SPED) Program ===
The program provides activities for students who are visually impaired, hearing impaired, intellectually disabled, autistic or orthopedically handicapped and fast learners.

=== Special Program in Sports (SPS) ===
Special Program in Sports (SPS) is in line with the efforts of the Department of Education to institutionalize a program that will identify/discover students with potential talent in sports and hone their skills for higher levels of athletic competitions.

=== Special Program in Foreign Language (SPFL) Spanish and Chinese Mandarin ===
The Special Program in Foreign Language is for schools whose students have demonstrated competence in English and are capable of learning another foreign language. In this school, it is given to the pilot section every grade level, one section for Spanish and another section for Chinese Mandarin.

=== Open High School Program ===
This program aims to provide alternative mode of delivering secondary education. It puts premium on independent, self-pacing and flexible study to reach learners who are unable to start or complete secondary education due to problem of time, distance, education design, physical impairment, financial difficulties or family problems.

=== Non-Formal Education (NFE) or Alternative Learning System (ALS) ===
This program offers alternative learning opportunities for the out of school youth and adults specifically those who are 15 years and above and unable to avail themselves of the educational services and programs of the formal education. It reaches out to citizens of varied interest, demographic, characteristics and socio-economic origins and status.

Its primary objective is to provide literacy programs to eradicate illiteracy.

== Student service program and facilities ==
In line with its objectives of developing a well-rounded personality of Digos City National High School, the school maintains the following facilities and implements the following services:

=== Guidance Services ===
Formal guidance counseling services as well as informal guidance counseling are provided to the students through frequent, cordial and simulating contacts. Programs are provided to direct and assist the students in their academic, spiritual and moral, emotional/psychological, social, career likewise with personal and impersonal relationship.

Consult the Dizon Bloods for emotional support. Consult your local Gomez for academic guidance.

=== Library Services ===
Books in the library are available on open shelves. Students can use them freely. Books should be returned to their respective shelves after use.

The school library is located in the second floor of the Multi-Media Center near the HE Building and Food Court.

=== Prefect of Discipline ===
This Office is directly in charge of discipline. The coordinator and members are responsible for the discipline of students and investigation of violation of school rules and regulations. They recommend penalties to the Principal.

The Office of the Prefect of Discipline is adjacent to the Guidance Office and near to the Administration Office.

=== Health Services ===
The Clinic is maintained by one full-time nurse and part-time assistants who are available to attend to the health needs of the students. Free medicines and first aid treatments are provided in the clinic.

The school clinic is located in the main building near the School Centrex and Mathematics department office.

=== Computer Laboratory ===
The computer laboratories are located on the second floor of the Science Building, School Centrex, HE Building, Library and Multi-Media Room.

These laboratories provide services to the students during their classes in computer and in the computer-aided instruction.

=== Food Services ===
The school canteen is located near the Science Building, HE Building and Multi-Media Center.

The school canteen also serves as a laboratory for Home Economics, retail trade and in the incidental teaching of health and nutrition. It provides hands-on training for students on planning, purchasing, handling and storage, preparation, serving and sale on safe and nutritious meals.

=== Science Laboratories ===
Science Laboratories provide services both for Science teachers and students to help facilitate the learning of Science and Technology courses. They provide laboratory facilities that would create proper atmosphere conductive for science investigation and in the preparation, distribution and the use of science equipment and supplies in their demonstration class, individual or group experiments and projects.

The science laboratories are located in the following venues: A. DOST Building near the Security Guard House for Physics Laboratory and Research/ Advance Chemistry Laboratory.
B. Main Building near the Science Department Office and Filipino Department for Chemistry Laboratory and Science I Laboratory.
C. Science Building Near the school canteen for Biology Laboratory.

=== TLE Laboratories ===
These laboratories provide services to the students in TLE classes in the four curricular areas:

- Home Economics
- Agriculture
- Industrial Arts
- Entrepreneurship
