= DXSV =

Philippine radio station

Muews Radio Digos (DXSV)
- Digos; Philippines
- Broadcast area: Davao del Sur, parts of Davao City
- Frequency: 96.7 MHz
- Branding: 96.7 Muews Radio

Programming
- Languages: Cebuano, Filipino
- Format: Contemporary MOR, News, Talk
- Network: Muews Radio
- Affiliations: DotTV

Ownership
- Owner: Sagay Broadcasting Corporation

History
- First air date: 2012
- Former frequencies: 97.5 MHz

Technical information
- Licensing authority: NTC
- Power: 5,000 watts

DXSV (96.7 FM), broadcasting as 96.7 Muews Radio, is a radio station owned and operated by Sagay Broadcasting Corporation. The station's studio is located at 2nd floor, La Castill Bldg., Magsaysay St., Brgy. Zone 1, Digos, and its transmitter is located at Brgy. Soong, Digos.
