= Sagay Broadcasting Corporation =

Philippine radio network

- Type: Private
- Industry: Broadcast
- Founded: 1995
- Headquarters: Digos, Davao del Sur
- Key people: Arvin Malaza CEO & President

Sagay Broadcasting Corporation is a Philippine radio network. Its main headquarters are located at 2/F, La Castill Bldg., Magsaysay St., Brgy. Zone 1, Digos. SBC operates a number of stations across the country under the Muews Radio brand.

== Stations ==
=== Muews Radio ===
Branding	Callsign	Frequency	Location
Muews Radio Digos	DXSV	96.7 MHz	Digos
Muews Radio Dapitan	—N/a	104.5 MHz	Dapitan

=== Kakampi TV ===
Branding	Callsign	Channel	Location	Type
K37 TV Digos	DXSQ-DTV	TV-38	Digos	Originating

=== Former stations ===
Frequency	Location	Status
104.7 MHz	Tabuk	Acquired by Brigada Mass Media Corporation. Currently broadcasting as Brigada News FM.
107.9 MHz	Tarlac City	Defunct.
106.7 MHz	Lagonoy	Defunct.
98.1 MHz	Tayasan	Acquired by Inetworks Multimedia Solutions. Currently broadcasting as Starr Radio.
104.1 MHz	Catbalogan	Defunct.
104.7 MHz	Talisay	Acquired by Cadiz Radio and TV Network. Currently broadcasting as Hapi 104.7.
97.7 MHz	Oroquieta	Acquired by Kalayaan Broadcasting System. Currently broadcasting as Gold FM.
104.7 MHz	General Santos	Defunct.
100.5 MHz	Kiamba	Defunct.
96.1 MHz	Midsayap	Defunct.
99.1 MHz	Pagadian	Defunct.
