= DZMC =

Radio station in Tarlac, Philippines

Jelexie Radio (DZMC)
Tarlac City; Philippines
- Broadcast area: Tarlac and surrounding areas
- Frequency: 91.1 MHz
- Branding: 91.1 Jelexie Radio

Programming
- Languages: Kapampangan, Filipino
- Format: Contemporary MOR, OPM, Talk

Ownership
- Owner: Acacia Broadcasting Corporation
- Operator: JVP Bread King Corporation

History
- First air date: 1998
- Former names: DZMC (1998-2002, 2008-2018); Mom's Radio (2002-2008); Muews Radio (2018-2019)
- Call sign meaning: Music Center (former branding)

Technical information
- Licensing authority: NTC
- Power: 5 kW

Links
- Webcast: Listen Live

91.1 Jelexie Radio (DZMC 91.1 MHz) is an FM station owned by Acacia Broadcasting Corporation and operated by JVP Bread King Corporation. Its studios and transmitter are located at Luisita Industrial Park, Brgy. San Miguel, Tarlac City.

== History ==
DZMC first went on air sometime in 1998 after Acacia Broadcasting Corporation bought the frequency from Nation Broadcasting Corporation. At that time, it had the widest audience share in the province and was known for playing songs against the then-president Joseph Estrada. In 2002, Southern Broadcasting Network leased the station & became part of Mom's Radio network with an AC & Talk format.

In August 2008, TNC Promotions & Advertising leased the station & rebranded it back to DZMC with a Classic Hits & Talk format. In December 2018, Sagay Broadcasting Corporation took over the station's frequency and moved Muews Radio from 107.9. However, in June 2019, their contract with Acacia was terminated and Muews Radio moved back to its original frequency. As a result, this left the frequency dormant.

In October 2022, the station returned on air, this time as Jelexie Radio. Under the management of JVP Bread King Corporation, owner of Jelexie Bakeshop, it airs a music and talk format.
