= DXKO-FM =

Radio station in Digos, Philippines

Gold FM Digos (DXKO)
- Digos; Philippines
- Broadcast area: Davao del Sur, parts of Davao City
- Frequency: 103.1 MHz
- Branding: 103.1 Gold FM

Programming
- Languages: Cebuano, Filipino
- Format: Contemporary MOR, OPM
- Network: Gold FM

Ownership
- Owner: Kalayaan Broadcasting System

History
- First air date: November 12, 2008
- Former call signs: DXRM (November 2008-April 2012)
- Former frequencies: 93.5 MHz (November 2008-April 2012)

Technical information
- Licensing authority: NTC
- Power: 1,000 watts
- ERP: 2,100 watts

Links
- Website: http://goldfmdigos.com/

DXKO (103.1 FM), on-air as 103.1 Gold FM, is a radio station owned and operated by Kalayaan Broadcasting System. The station's studio is located along Vinzon St., Digos.
