= Andres Bonifacio College =

Private college in Zamboanga del Norte, Philippines

- Pamantasang Andres Bonifacio (Filipino)
- Other names: ABCollege
- Former names: Andres Bonifacio Institute
- Motto: Industry, Intelligence, Integrity.
- Type: Private
- Established: 1940
- Founders: Amando B. Amatong; Felicidad S. Amatong
- Religious affiliation: Nonsectarian
- President: Ernesto S. Amatong
- Vice-president: Araceli C. Amatong-Tomas (Finance and Administration); Julius B. Elopre, MAGC (Academic Affairs)
- Dean: List: Shirley G. Bellino (OIC-Graduate School); Ma. Cheryl Angela Q. Pacatang-Barbaso (School of Law); Leo C. Naparota (Acting Dean-College of Arts and Sciences); Demetrio D. Martus (School of Agriculture); Leo C. Naparota (School of Criminal Justice Education); Shirley G. Bellino (School of Education); Alejo F. Abule (School of Business Management Education); Rey C. Basadre (School of Engineering); Precy Nelia C. Gilaga (School of Nursing)
- Location: College Park, Miputak, Dipolog, Zamboanga del Norte, 7100, Philippines; 8.58124°N 123.34037°E
- Campus: *Main Campus - College Park, Miputak; GODECOST Building - 3rd Floor, Felicidad I Building, Quezon Avenue, Miputak (School of Law); Innovation Center for Agriculture - Santa Isabel
- Newspaper: The Bonifacio Standard
- Colors: Yellow
- Sporting affiliations: ZPRAA, PRISAA
- Website: abcollege.edu.ph

Andres Bonifacio College (ABCollege or ABC) is a community college institution in the Philippines. Its campus is located at College Park, Brgy. Miputak, Dipolog. ABCollege offers course programs from kindergarten to postgraduate levels. Alumni and students of the college are referred to as Bonifacians.

== History ==
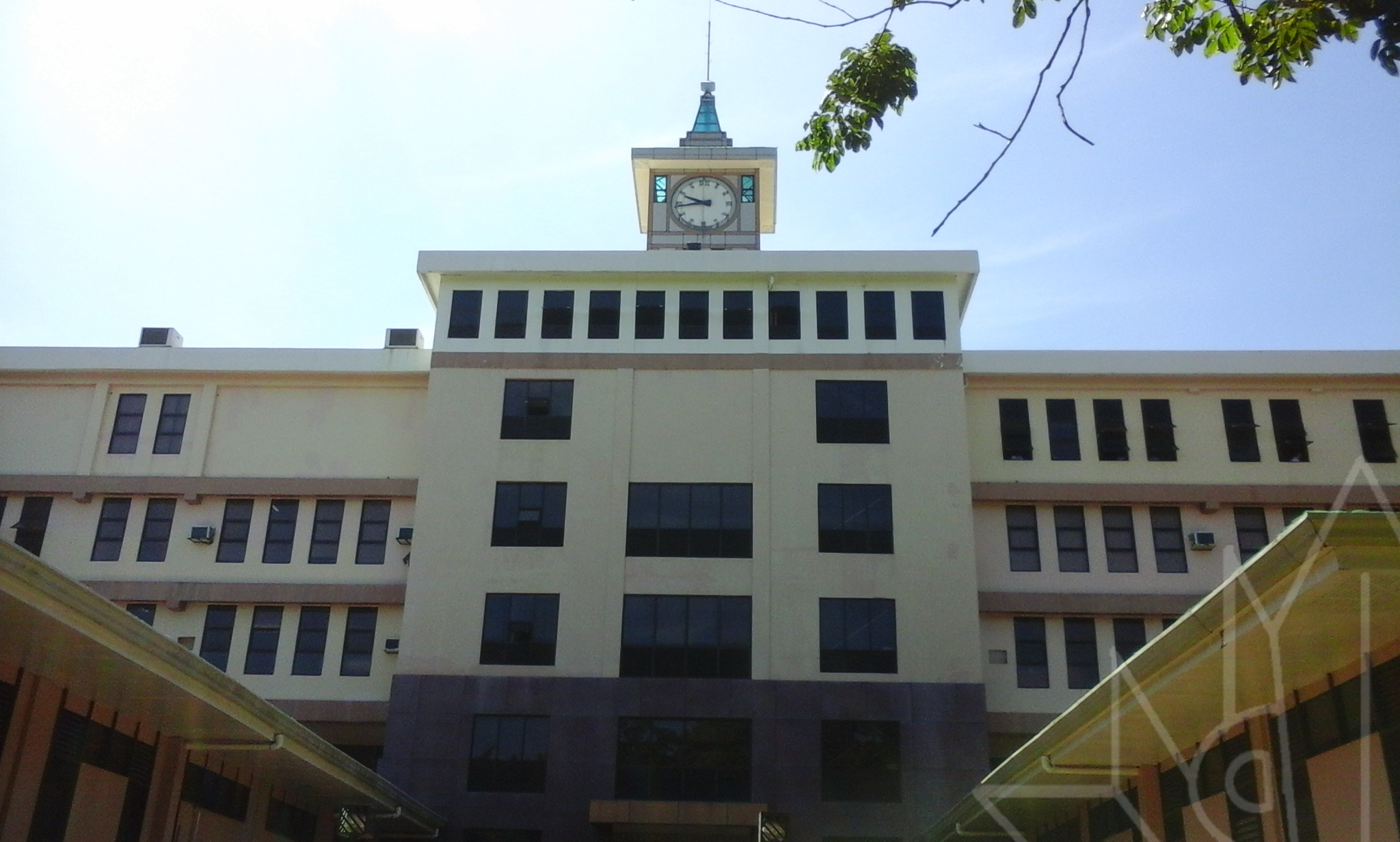
Graduate and Professional School Building at the College Park campus

Andres Bonifacio College was founded in 1940 as Andres Bonifacio Institute by Amando B. Amatong and Felicidad S. Amatong. The college was named after Andres Bonifacio, a revolutionary leader, to which Amando himself found inspiration being born to poverty in Dalaguete, Cebu. The original location of ABI used to be in what is now Festival Shopping Arcade 1 in Rizal Avenue corner Magsaysay Street, Barangay Central.

Amando Amatong died on April 21, 1943, leaving his wife Felicidad to operate the institute while taking care of their eight young children. To maintain ABI's operation, Amando's youngest brother Silverio B. Amatong was appointed as the institute's president. From its original campus used since its founding, the college permanently transferred to what it is now known as College Park in Barangay Miputak after a fire razed the institute's buildings and nearby structures to the ground in 1968.

== Student life ==
=== Student Publication ===
The official student publication of the college is The Bonifacio Standard, while the student publication for the high school department is 'The Blue Quill' and student publication for the college's elementary department is The Alphabet Soup.

=== Broadcasting ===
ABCollege operates a number of radio stations across Mindanao under its media arm Andres Bonifacio College Broadcasting System, established on July 16, 1995.

Callsign	Frequency	Power	Location
DXAA	92.5 MHz	5 kW	Dipolog
DXFA	98.5 MHz	5 kW	Liloy
DXPA	103.1 MHz	5 kW	Nabunturan

=== Newspaper ===
The Mindanao Observer, founded in 1965, is a bilingual (English and Cebuano), bi-weekly newspaper in circulation in the provinces of Zamboanga del Norte, Zamboanga del Sur, and Zamboanga Sibugay. Despite being connected with the college, it operates as a separate entity with the Andres Bonifacio College Press as its publisher. It is said to cease newspaper publication and/or moved online due to the impact of the COVID-19 pandemic in the Philippines.

== Notable people ==
- Isagani S. Amatong (LL. B., 1970) - former Provincial Governor (1986-1995; 1998–2004), and Congressman of the 3rd District of Zamboanga del Norte (2013–2022)
- Zorro Aguilar - lawyer, activist, newspaper editor, and martial law victim.
- Athalia Briones Liong (LL. B., 2016) - lawyer for the Office of the Solicitor General, and Top 3 in the 2016 Philippine Bar Examinations
