= Monkayo =

Municipality in Davao de Oro, Philippines

- Municipality
- Municipality of Monkayo
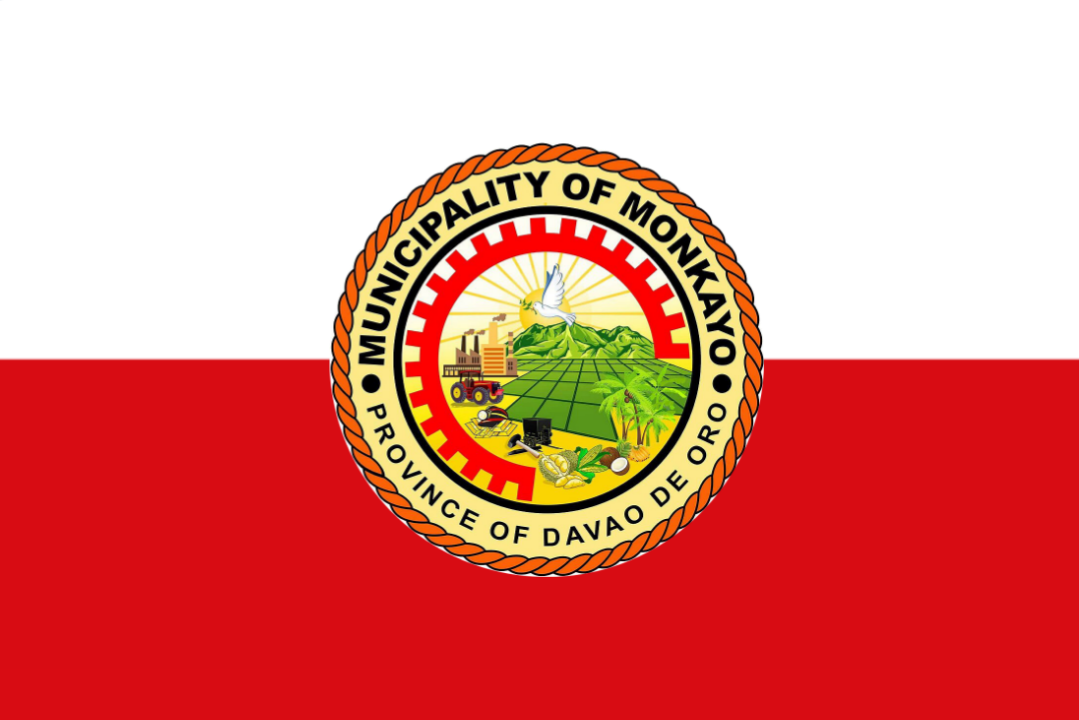
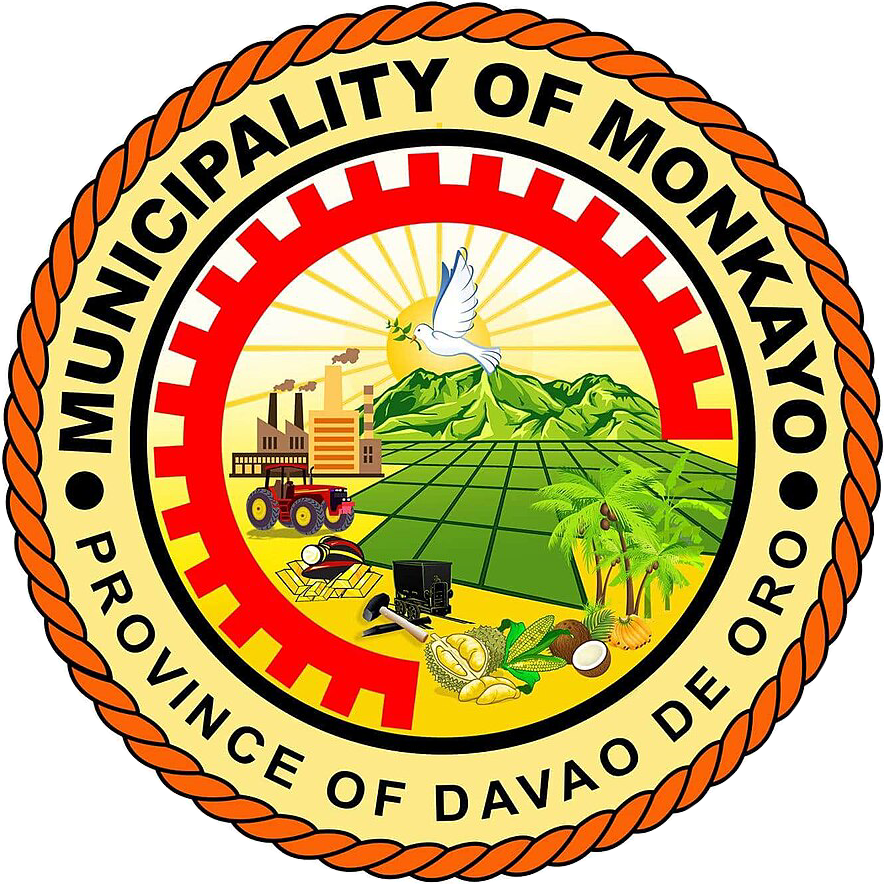
- Flag Seal
- Nickname: Gold Ore Hub of Davao de Oro
- Map of Davao de Oro with Monkayo highlighted
- Interactive map of Monkayo
- Location within the Philippines
- Coordinates: 7°49′26″N 126°03′13″E
- Country: Philippines
- Region: Davao Region
- Province: Davao de Oro
- District: 1st district
- Founded: September 14, 1954
- Barangays: 21 (see Barangays)

Government
  - Type: Sangguniang Bayan
  - Mayor: Manuel E. Zamora
  - Vice Mayor: Manuel B . Brillantes jr
  - Representative: Maria Carmen S. Zamora
  - Municipal Council: Members: Jocelyn C. Burgos; Marlon H. Tumaob; Kimberly Benazir May R. Codilla; Joel D. Basañes II; Brendo T. Ceniza; Ronald T. Manzano; Avelino T. Cabag; Antonio F. Saavedra Jr.
  - Electorate: 67,089 voters (2025)

Area
  - Total: 609.61 km^{2} (235.37 sq mi)
- Elevation: 100 m (330 ft)
- Highest elevation: 433 m (1,421 ft)
- Lowest elevation: 49 m (161 ft)

Population (2024 census)
  - Total: 96,405
  - Density: 158.14/km^{2} (409.59/sq mi)
  - Households: 23,521

Economy
  - Income class: 1st municipal income class
  - Poverty incidence: 18.42% (2023)
  - Revenue: ₱ 587 million (2024)
  - Assets: ₱ 1,810 million (2024)
  - Expenditure: ₱ 559.2 million (2024)
  - Liabilities: ₱ 360 million (2024)

Service provider
  - Electricity: Northern Davao Electric Cooperative (NORDECO)
- Time zone: UTC+8 (PST)
- ZIP code: 8805
- PSGC: 1108207000
- IDD : area code: +63 (0)87
- Native languages: Davawenyo; Cebuano; Kalagan; Mansaka; Tagalog; Ata Manobo
- Website: monkayo.gov.ph

Monkayo, officially the Municipality of Monkayo (Cebuano: Lungsod sa Monkayo; Filipino: Bayan ng Monkayo), is a municipality in the province of Davao de Oro, Philippines. According to the 2024 census, it has a population of 96,405 people, making it the most populous town in the province.

Monkayo is an agricultural town, with vast tracts of land planted to rice and banana. The municipality is also host to the gold-rich barangay of Mount Diwata, popularly known as "Diwalwal" (which in the local dialect means one's tongue is hanging out due to exhaustion), a 1,000-meter high range known for its rich gold ore deposit.

== Etymology ==
The Municipality of Monkayo is a political unit with a land area that was once and for a long period of time a wilderness in the Northern hinterlands of Davao de Oro. The name “Monkayo” is derived from a gigantic tree towering on top Tandawan mountains and its northern tip in between and immediately adjacent to the Agusan River. The tree is called “Mondabon Kayo” (Mondabon Tree). It was however shortened by the first settlers of the area as “Monkayo”.

In the other related version, it is believed that a certain Fr. Ladour, the first missionary priest assigned in the area, gave the place the name of Moncayo, a snow-topped mountain dividing the kingdoms of Aragon and Castile, in Spain, probably as an analogy to the high mountains in the area that reminded him of his own place of birth.

== History ==
Monkayo belonged to the northern hinterland of what is now called Davao de Oro. It was occupied by Lumad groups such as the Mandaya, Manobo, Mansaka, Manguangan and Dibabawon people who dwelt on primitive life and lived by hunting, fishing and crude method of farming (Kaingin) long before the Spanish conquistadors penetrated deep in Mindanao in the middle part of the 19th century. These different tribes or groups, each had a bagani as head or chief. They wore clothing and armed with bladed weapons and bows and arrows, they sang hymns called Tudom and long narrative songs called Owaging they danced and held rituals, feasted and chewed beetle nuts. Nevertheless, when Spanish missionaries came, these natives changed their lives and attitudes and eventually receptive to Christian teachings and ultimately embraced Christianity. Today, this municipality still has Mandaya, Dibabawon, Manguangan and Manobo, other tribes have transferred to other places.

Monkayo became a Municipal District in 1917. The position given to the highest official was District President. The first one appointed to the position was Adolfo Mongado, the first Mandayan educator who served from 1917 to 1925. The other prominent leaders who held the same position were : Ignacio Cervantes – 1926–1933; Ildefonso Labrador – 1934–1935; and Pedro Aroma – 1936–1937. The title of the position was changed to District Mayor in 1938 with the following officials: Jose Ibañez who served from 1938 to 1939, followed by Feliciano Cervantes who held the position from 1940 up to the end of the World War II.

During the Second World War, Monkayo was made an important military outpost. The 81st Military Division under the command of Col. Kangleon was established in the Poblacion and was named Camp Kalaw.

On September 4, 1954, Monkayo became a separate municipality by virtue of a Presidential Executive Order No. 65 by then President Ramon Magsaysay of the Republic of the Philippines. The first mayor was Angelo Ortiz (Sept. 1954–Oct. 1955), who also was responsible for making Monkayo an independent municipality. Alejandro Peñaranda (Nov. 1955-Dec. 1955) was the shortest reigning mayor for only one month, the next appointed mayor who donated portion of his land which became part of the Municipal Town Site. He was followed by Severino Lacson (Jan. 1956-Nov. 1964), Jose T. Amacio (Nov. 1964-Mar. 1972), and Anastacio C. Basañes. After the EDSA Revolution, Mayor Anastacio Basañes was succeeded by Constantino Alcaraz (April 1986 – 1992) as Officer In-Charge by virtue of the Freedom Constitution implemented under President Corazon Aquino. He was succeeded by Rizal G. Gentugaya, and Avelino T. Cabag (1998 to 2001).

On May 8, 1967, Monkayo became part of the new province of Davao del Norte following the division of Davao.

In September 1983, gold was discovered by a Lumad named Camilo Banad at Mount Diwata in the town's mountainous eastern portion. The deposits found were estimated to have contained $1.8 billion worth of untapped gold reserves. The discovery of such massive gold deposits triggered a massive gold rush of unprecedented scale by people from all over the Philippines into the mountain, that at one point the mining community at the mountain's slopes became home to some 100,000 to 130,000 inhabitants and prospectors by the late 1980's, making Monkayo one of the largest towns in Davao Region during this time. This led to the incorporation of the mining community on Mount Diwata into a barangay of Monkayo in 1987 via Provincial Proclamation No. 01 of the province of Davao del Norte, in which the town was a part of prior to the creation of the province of Compostela Valley, the present-day Davao de Oro, in 1998. The unorganized gold rush resulted in deaths of miners from mercury and lead poisoning, accidents and mine collapses, as well as killings from various groups including Lumad tribal militias, Communist rebels, segments of the Moro National Liberation Front, other paramilitary groups, mercenaries at the hire of giant corporations vying for the control of the numerous mines in the area, and government forces including the Army, police and the Constabulary trying to maintain or restore order. To prevent further incidents from happening as well as to regulate the otherwise unregulated mining in the area, President Gloria Macapagal Arroyo signed Proclamation No. 297 in year 2002 declaring a huge part of the mountain as a mineral reserve and an environmentally critical area. Despite the presidential proclamation and prior regulatory Republic Acts, however, the mining in the Diwalwal area continues to the present day.

On March 7, 1998, Monkayo became part of the new province of Compostela Valley (now Davao de Oro), when Republic Act No. 8470 was ratified through a plebiscite.

On June 28, 2003, Mayor Joel Brillantes was assassinated by barangay tanod Aniceto "Sitoy" Dejeto Jr. in a cockfighting arena in Matina, Davao City. Dejeto himself was shot dead shortly after by three unknown men according to Criminal Investigation and Detection Group Chief Eduardo Matillano. Among the alleged perpetrators of the assassination was mining magnate Jose Nelson "Tata" Sala, a politician based in Santa Cruz, Davao del Sur whom President Gloria Macapagal Arroyo explicitly accused as a murderer alongside his brother Edgar for the 2003 assassination. In 2009, during an investigation by the Commission on Human Rights in Davao City, Sala was named by a witness as a perpetrator in Brillantes's assassination alongside Dejeto and Reynaldo "Tiwi" Cajes.

== Geography ==
Monkayo is 120 kilometres (75 mi) from Mindanao's regional center of Davao City, and some 30 kilometres (19 mi) from Nabunturan, the provincial center.

=== Barangays ===
Monkayo is politically subdivided into 21 barangays. Each barangay consists of puroks while some have sitios.

- Awao
- Babag
- Banlag
- Baylo
- Casoon
- Inambatan
- Haguimitan
- Macopa
- Mamunga
- Mount Diwata (Mt. Diwalwal)
- Naboc
- Olaycon
- Pasian (Santa Filomena)
- Poblacion
- Rizal
- Salvacion
- San Isidro
- San Jose
- Tubo-tubo (New Del Monte)
- Upper Ulip
- Union

=== Climate ===
Climate data for Monkayo
Month	Jan	Feb	Mar	Apr	May	Jun	Jul	Aug	Sep	Oct	Nov	Dec	Year
Mean daily maximum °C (°F)	27 (81)	27 (81)	28 (82)	29 (84)	30 (86)	29 (84)	29 (84)	30 (86)	30 (86)	30 (86)	29 (84)	28 (82)	29 (84)
Mean daily minimum °C (°F)	23 (73)	23 (73)	23 (73)	23 (73)	24 (75)	24 (75)	24 (75)	24 (75)	24 (75)	24 (75)	24 (75)	23 (73)	24 (74)
Average precipitation mm (inches)	160 (6.3)	127 (5.0)	96 (3.8)	62 (2.4)	141 (5.6)	197 (7.8)	185 (7.3)	186 (7.3)	183 (7.2)	181 (7.1)	128 (5.0)	111 (4.4)	1,757 (69.2)
Average rainy days	20.0	17.2	15.9	13.9	23.8	27.2	28.1	28.2	27.0	27.0	21.3	18.7	268.3
Source: Meteoblue (modeled/calculated data, not measured locally)

== Demographics ==
Population census of Monkayo
Year	Pop.	±% p.a.
1918	4,898	—
1939	2,741	−2.73%
1960	16,062	+8.78%
1970	24,597	+4.35%
1975	34,120	+6.78%
1980	37,571	+1.94%
1990	58,239	+4.48%
1995	66,550	+2.53%
2000	85,830	+5.61%
2007	90,971	+0.81%
2010	94,827	+1.52%
2015	94,908	+0.02%
2020	93,937	−0.22%
2024	96,405	+0.62%
Source: Philippine Statistics Authority

In the 2024 census, the population of Monkayo was 96,405 people, with a density of 160 inhabitants per square kilometre or 410 inhabitants per square mile.

It is the most populous among the municipalities of Compostela Valley.

Ethnic groups:

- Mandayas
- Dibabawons
- Mansakas
- Manobos

=== Religion ===
The largest group is the Roman Catholic having 65% of the population, other Christian group comprises (Evangelicals, Born Again, Kingdom of Jesus Christ) comprises 10%, the Iglesia ni Cristo comprises 10% and the remaining 15% belong to the other non-Christian groups.

- Roman Catholic: 65%
- Islam: 12.5%
- Iglesia ni Cristo 10%
- Other Christian Groups: 10%

== Economy ==
Poverty incidence of Monkayo (%)

Source: Philippine Statistics Authority

== Tourism ==
Kumbilan Cave (Casoon)
Kumbilan Cave has tunnel-like features and wide chambers laden with stalactites, stalagmites and other formations. Fauna observed within the cave are snakes and fruit flies. The cave is home to the "kabyaw" fruit bats.

Mt. Diwalwal
A barangay of 18,000 people, mostly migrants from Surigao, Agusan and Cebu - all dependent on gold. Small-scale mining has been their major industry since the gold-rush in the area in the 1980s.

Seven Waterfalls of Awao
The gushing water coming from above are not that high in volume but cold but not chilling; it is noticeable that the fauna on its surroundings as well as the moss that was formed above the rocks where the falls are flowing are still thick.

Octagon Farm
Owned by Congressman Manuel Zamora Sr.

Upper Ulip Hot Spring
This is one of the nearest springs near the famed Mount Diwata.

Sagay and Pasian Falls.

== Culture ==
Another Spanish influence that remains up to this day is the observance and celebration of barrios, or villages, of the day of their respective patron saint called "Fiesta". It is in these celebrations wherein songs, dances and other forms of arts and merrymaking from various cultures have evolved creatively into the sights and sounds of Monkayo now.

Kariyawan Festival
Kariyawan Festival which is celebrated every September 4 is also one of the highlights in the municipality. This tells of the story of a diwata who has protected the people of Monkayo and who has given the first gold to the people.

Binibining Monkayo
Is the organization responsible for sponsoring the annual town beauty pageant which selects the beautiful girl throughout the municipality of Monkayo.

Monkayo Fiesta
Monkayo's celebration of the Feast of St. Ignatius de Loyola every July 31.

Araw ng Monkayo
The celebration falls on September 4.

== Transportation ==
There are various means to travel to Monkayo. The common modes of transportation within the municipality are multicabs, jeepneys, motorcycles. Tricycles play the routes that are outside the main streets of the town. In mountainous areas, the habal-habal passenger motorcycle is the main mode of transportation.

== Education ==
Secondary

Public High Schools:

- Awao National High School, located at Awao
- Babag National High School, located at Babag
- Casoon National High School, located at Casoon
- Monkayo National High School, located at Poblacion
- Mt. Diwata National High School, located at Mt.Diwata
- Pasian National High School, located at Pasian
- Tubo-tubo National High School, located at Tubo-tubo
- Union National High School, located at Union
- Upper Ulip National High School, located at Upper Ulip.

Private High School:

- Assumption Academy of Monkayo, Inc., located at Poblacion

Colleges and University

- Monkayo College of Arts Science And Technology (MONCAST) - administered by the municipal government of Monkayo.
- MATIF - TESDA accredited school
