= DXBZ-FM =

Radio station in Davao de Oro, Philippines

Juander Radyo Nabunturan (DXBZ)
- Nabunturan; Philippines
- Broadcast area: Davao de Oro, Davao del Norte
- Frequency: 88.5 MHz
- Branding: 88.5 Juander Radyo

Programming
- Languages: Cebuano, Filipino
- Format: Contemporary MOR, News, Talk

Ownership
- Owner: Rizal Memorial Colleges Broadcasting Corporation
- Operator: RSV Broadcasting Network, Inc.

History
- First air date: 2015
- Former names: YKFM (2015–2020); ZRadio (2020–2022)

Technical information
- Licensing authority: NTC
- Power: 5 kW
- ERP: 10 kW

Links
- Webcast: juandernabunturan.ismyradio.com
- Website: juanderradyo.com

88.5 Juander Radyo (DXBZ 88.5 MHz) is an FM station owned by Rizal Memorial Colleges Broadcasting Corporation and operated by RSV Broadcasting Network, Inc. The station studio and transmitter is located at Purok 8, Poblacion, Nabunturan.

== History ==
The station was established in 2015 as YKFM on 107.3 MHz under the management of YK Broadcasting Service of Rep. Manuel "Way Kurat" Zamora. In 2016, the station moved to its new home, the RMCBC-owned 88.5 FM. On July 8, 2020, it was relaunched as ZRadio and became an affiliate station of FMR Philippines, the flagship radio network of the Philippine Collective Media Corporation.

In June 2022, the station went off-the-air permanently due to the presence of XFM Mati (operated by Yes2Health Advertising, Inc.), which broadcasts from the neighboring province of Davao Oriental on the same frequency. As a result, PCMC purchased ZRadio's non-license assets (such as programming and on-air personalities) and transferred to 96.7 FM.

On November 4, 2024, the station resumed broadcasting under the Juander Radyo network of RSV Broadcasting Network.
