= DZAU =

Radio station in Camarines Norte, Philippines

Radyo Bantayog (DZAU)
- Talisay; Philippines
- Broadcast area: Camarines Norte and surrounding areas
- Frequency: 1233 kHz
- Branding: DZAU 1233 Radyo Bantayog

Programming
- Languages: Bicolano, Filipino
- Format: News, Public Affairs, Talk

Ownership
- Owner: Polytechnic Foundation of Cotabato and Asia

History
- First air date: 2010

Technical information
- Licensing authority: NTC
- Power: 5,000 watts
- Repeater: 91.3 MHz

Links
- Webcast: https://www.facebook.com/RBFM913/

DZAU (1233 AM) Radyo Bantayog is a radio station owned and operated by the Polytechnic Foundation of Cotabato and Asia. Its studios and transmitter are located at Heritage Homes, Brgy. Binanuan, Talisay, Camarines Norte.
