= DXTO =

Radio station in Tagum, Philippines

Charm Radio Tagum (DXTO)
Tagum; Philippines
- Broadcast area: Davao del Norte, Davao de Oro, parts of Davao City
- Frequency: 103.9 MHz
- Branding: 103.9 Charm Radio

Programming
- Languages: Cebuano, Filipino
- Format: Contemporary MOR, OPM
- Network: Charm Radio

Ownership
- Owner: Polytechnic Foundation of Cotabato and Asia

History
- First air date: 2001

Technical information
- Licensing authority: NTC
- Power: 5,000 watts

DXTO (103.9 FM), broadcasting as 103.9 Charm Radio, is a radio station owned and operated by the Polytechnic Foundation of Cotabato and Asia. The station's studio is located at Purok Rosal, Brgy. Visayan Village, Tagum.
