= DXWG =

Philippine radio station

Radyo Natin Tagum (DXWG)
- Tagum; Philippines
- Broadcast area: Southern Davao del Norte, parts of Davao de Oro
- Frequency: 107.9 MHz
- Branding: 107.9 Radyo Natin

Programming
- Languages: Cebuano, Filipino
- Format: Community radio
- Network: Radyo Natin Network

Ownership
- Owner: MBC Media Group; (Pacific Broadcasting System)
- Operator: Wise Ad & Promotions

History
- First air date: December 18, 2004

Technical information
- Licensing authority: NTC
- Power: 1,000 watts

DXWG (107.9 FM), broadcasting as 107.9 Radyo Natin, is a radio station owned by MBC Media Group through its licensee Pacific Broadcasting System and operated by Wise Ad & Promotions. The station's studio is located at the 3rd floor, Leonardia Bldg. Sobrecarey St. cor. Roxas Ext., Tagum.
