= St. Jude Thaddeus Institute of Technology =

Private college in Surigao del Norte, Philippines

- SJTIT
- Type: Private
- Established: 1977
- President: George M. Salabao
- Location: Surigao City, Surigao del Norte, Philippines; 9°47′12″N 125°29′53″E
- Colors: Green
- Nickname: SJTIT
- Website: sjtit.edu.ph
- Location in Mindanao Location in the Philippines

St. Jude Thaddeus Institute of Technology is a private college in the Philippines. Its main campus is located along Borromeo St., Brgy Taft., Surigao City.

== Programs and courses ==
=== College ===
- Bachelor of Arts in Broadcasting - Broadcasting
- Bachelor of Elementary Education - English
- Bachelor of Secondary Education - English
- Bachelor of Science in Business Administration
- Bachelor of Science in Criminology
- Bachelor of Science in Customs Administration

=== Senior High School ===
- Accountancy, Business, and Management (ABM)
- General Academic Strand (GAS)
- Humanities and Social Sciences (HUMSS)
- Science, Technology, Engineering, and Mathematics (STEM)

== Media operations ==
SJTIT also owns radio and TV stations across the country under its name. Its radio stations carry the Infinite Radio branding.

=== Radio stations ===
Branding	Callsign	Frequency	Location
Infinite Radio Surigao	DXSJ	93.3 MHz	Surigao City
Infinite Radio Claver	DXUS	99.3 MHz	Claver
Infinite Radio San Francisco	DXOJ	100.1 MHz	San Francisco
Infinite Radio Butuan	DXKA	90.1 MHz	Butuan
Infinite Radio Tandag	DXOW	90.1 MHz	Tandag
Infinite Radio Bislig	DXEE	100.1 MHz	Bislig
Infinite Radio Panabo	DXOD	96.1 MHz	Panabo
Infinite Radio Mati	DXEV	107.9 MHz	Mati
Infinite Radio General Santos	DXRG	96.7 MHz	General Santos
Infinite Radio Isulan	—N/a	93.3 MHz	Isulan
Infinite Radio Kidapawan	DXSY	100.7 MHz	Kidapawan
Infinite Radio Alamada	—N/a	100.9 MHz	Alamada
Infinite Radio Valencia	DXVC	91.3 MHz	Valencia
Infinite Radio Sugbongcogon	—N/a	100.3 MHz	Sugbongcogon
Infinite Radio Dipolog	DXEW	98.1 MHz	Dipolog
Infinite Radio Aurora	—N/a	88.1 MHz	Aurora
Infinite Radio Ipil	DXIP	94.3 MHz	Ipil
Infinite Radio Calbayog	DYIP	92.1 MHz	Calbayog
Infinite Radio Villaba	DYDV	94.9 MHz	Villaba
Infinite Radio Bohol	DYAU	92.9 MHz	Jagna
Infinite Radio Batangas	DWKV	102.3 MHz	Lipa

=== TV Stations (inactive) ===
Branding	Callsign	Channel	Location	Type
ABS-CBN Surigao	DXSJ-TV	TV-12	Surigao City	Affiliate of ABS-CBN Corporation
