= DXKN =

Gold FM Tagum (DXKN)
Tagum; Philippines
- Broadcast area: Davao del Norte, Davao de Oro, parts of Davao City
- Frequency: 98.3 MHz
- Branding: 98.3 Gold FM

Programming
- Languages: Cebuano, Filipino
- Format: Contemporary MOR, OPM
- Network: Gold FM

Ownership
- Owner: Kalayaan Broadcasting System

History
- First air date: 2008 (as X); 2012 (as Gold FM)
- Former frequencies: 88.7 (2008–2012)
- Call sign meaning: KalayaaN

Technical information
- Licensing authority: NTC
- Power: 5,000 Watts

Links
- Website: http://goldfmtagum.webs.com/

DXKN (98.3 FM), broadcasting as 98.3 Gold FM, is a radio station owned and operated by Kalayaan Broadcasting System. The station's studio is located along Bonifacio St., Tagum.

It was formerly known as X 88.7 from 2008 to 2012, when it transferred from 88.7 FM to 98.3 FM & rebranded as Gold FM.
