= Kalayaan Broadcasting System, Inc. =

Philippine radio network

Kalayaan Broadcasting System
- Type: Private
- Industry: Broadcast
- Founded: January 6, 1987
- Headquarters: Davao City, Philippines
- Key people: Anthony Alexander Valoria President & CEO
- Owner: Anflo Management and Investment Corporation

Kalayaan Broadcasting System, Inc. (KBSI) is a Philippine radio network. Its main headquarters is located at Damosa Bldg., J.P. Laurel Ave., Brgy. Lanang, Davao City. KBSI operates a number of stations across the country under the Gold FM and Radyo Rapido brandings.

== KBSI stations ==
=== Radyo Rapido ===
Branding	Callsign	Frequency	Location
Radyo Rapido Davao	DXRR	1017 kHz	Davao City
Radyo Rapido Mati	DXWM	91.9 MHz	Mati
Radyo Rapido Dipolog	—N/a	91.7 MHz	Dipolog

=== Gold FM ===
Branding	Callsign	Frequency	Location
Gold FM Digos	DXKO	103.1 MHz	Digos
Gold FM Tagum	DXKN	98.3 MHz	Tagum
Gold FM Compostela	—N/a	98.1 MHz	Compostela
Gold FM Bansalan	—N/a	98.3 MHz	Bansalan
Gold FM Radyo Kamagi	DXKP	103.9 MHz	Malita
Gold FM Sindangan	—N/a	96.7 MHz	Sindangan
Gold FM Oroquieta	—N/a	97.7 MHz	Oroquieta
Gold FM Calamba	—N/a	94.7 MHz	Calamba

=== Others ===
Branding	Callsign	Frequency	Location
Madayaw FM	DXKH	99.7 MHz	Baganga
The Rock	—N/a	97.7 MHz	Bislig
GFM One Life Radio	DXLK	103.9 MHz	General Santos
GNN FM	DXKW	94.1 MHz	Tulunan
Joy FM Kidapawan	DXKF	102.3 MHz	Kidapawan
Sky Radio	—N/a	98.5 MHz	M'lang
Radyo Kaibigan	DXLG	98.5 MHz	Valencia
Vibe Radio	DXWS	105.3 MHz	Malaybalay
Layag News FM	—N/a	99.5 MHz	Cotabato City
Magnet FM	—N/a	107.3 MHz	Datu Blah T. Sinsuat
Nonglading Radio Iligan	—N/a	104.1 MHz	Iligan
Radyo Suyog	—N/a	92.5 MHz	Surigao City
