= DXKW (Cotabato) =

Good News Network
Tulunan; Philippines
- Broadcast area: Southern Cotabato, parts of Maguindanao and Sultan Kudarat
- Frequency: 94.1 MHz
- Branding: 94.1 GNN FM

Programming
- Languages: Cebuano, Filipino
- Format: Contemporary MOR, News, Talk

Ownership
- Owner: Kalayaan Broadcasting System

History
- First air date: October 14, 2009

Technical information
- Licensing authority: NTC
- Power: 5 kW

94.1 GNN FM (DXKW 94.1 MHz) is an FM station owned and operated by Kalayaan Broadcasting System. Its studios and transmitter are located at Sorilla Medical and Maternity Clinic and Hospital, National Highway, Brgy. Sibsib, Tulunan.
