= DXPA =

Radio station in Davao de Oro, Philippines

- Nabunturan; Philippines
- Broadcast area: Davao del Norte and Davao de Oro
- Frequency: 103.1 MHz
- Branding: DXPA 103.1 Radyo Serbisyo

Programming
- Languages: Cebuano, Filipino
- Format: Contemporary MOR, News, Talk

Ownership
- Owner: Andres Bonifacio College Broadcasting System

History
- First air date: December 8, 2008
- Call sign meaning: Prospero Amatong

Technical information
- Licensing authority: NTC
- Power: 5,000 watts

DXPA (103.1 FM) Radyo Serbisyo is a radio station owned and operated by Andres Bonifacio College Broadcasting System. Its studios and transmitter are located at Purok 4, Brgy. Sta. Maria, Nabunturan.
