= DXLT =

Philippine radio station

RPFM (DXLT)
Tagum; Philippines
- Broadcast area: Davao del Norte, Davao de Oro, parts of Davao City
- Frequency: 99.9 MHz
- Branding: 99.9 RPFM

Programming
- Languages: Cebuano, Filipino
- Format: Contemporary MOR, News, Talk

Ownership
- Owner: Kaissar Broadcasting Network
- Operator: RP Advertising and Communications

History
- First air date: September 23, 2015

Technical information
- Licensing authority: NTC
- Power: 2,000 Watts

DXLT (99.9 FM), broadcasting as 99.9 RPFM, is a radio station owned by Kaissar Broadcasting Network and operated by RP Advertising and Communications. The station's studio is located at the 3rd Floor, Casaway Bldg., Abad Santos St., Tagum, and its transmitter is located in Mawab.

On December 11, 2019, RPFM's transmitter site is burned down by unidentified men.
