= DXDN-AM =

Radio station in Tagum, Philippines

DXDN
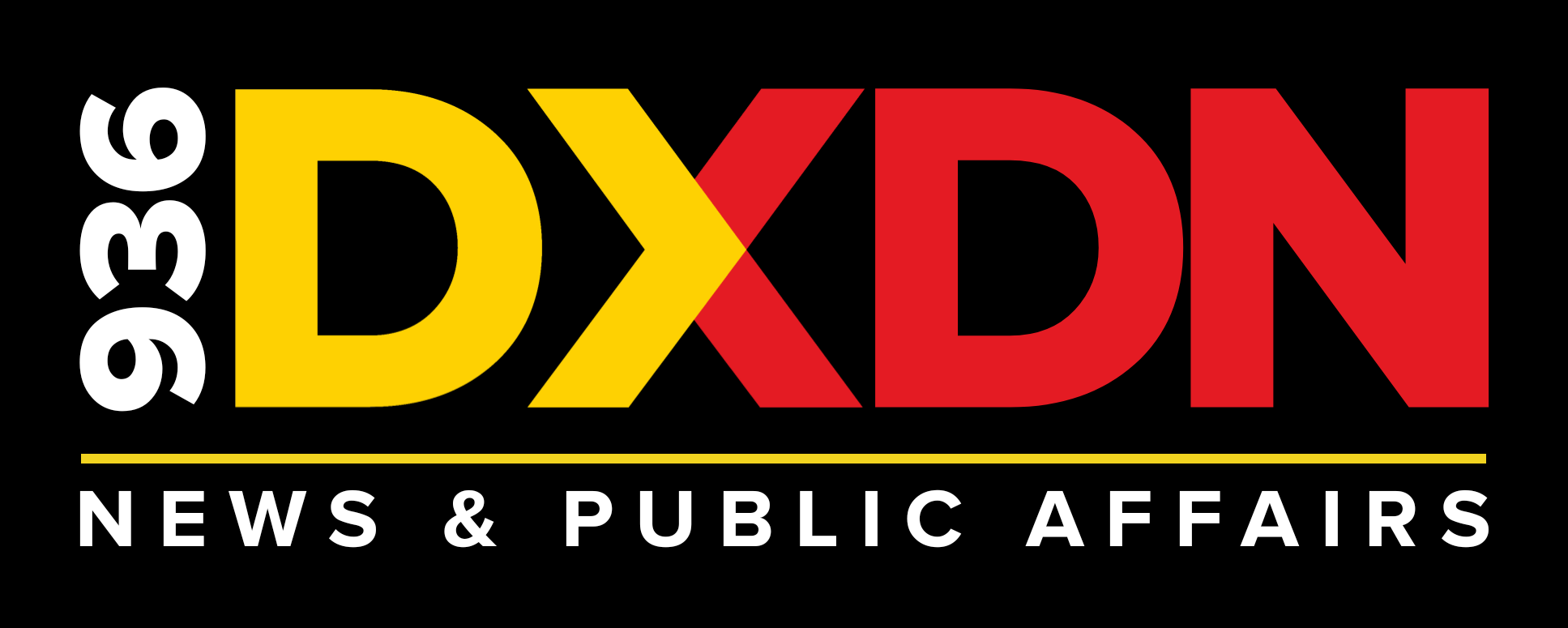
- Tagum; Philippines
- Broadcast area: Northern Davao Region
- Frequency: 936 kHz
- Branding: 936 DXDN

Programming
- Languages: Cebuano, Filipino
- Format: News, Public Affairs, Talk
- Network: UMBN News & Public Affairs

Ownership
- Owner: UM Broadcasting Network

History
- First air date: October 4, 1967
- Former call signs: DXUM (1957–1988)
- Former frequencies: 88.7 MHz (2012–2019)
- Call sign meaning: Davao del Norte

Technical information
- Licensing authority: NTC
- Power: 5,000 watts
- Repeater: 92.5 MHz

DXDN (936 AM) is a radio station owned and operated by UM Broadcasting Network. The station's studio and transmitter are located in Purok Cacao, Brgy. Visayan Village, Tagum.

It was formerly known as Radyo Ukay from 2000 to June 14, 2020. On June 15, 2020, management decided to retire the branding as it has run its course. DXDN, along with its other AM stations, started carrying their perspective call letters in their brandings. The yellow highlighted in the "X" of their logos means to move forward.
