= Nabunturan =

Capital of Davao de Oro, Philippines

- Municipality
- Municipality of Nabunturan
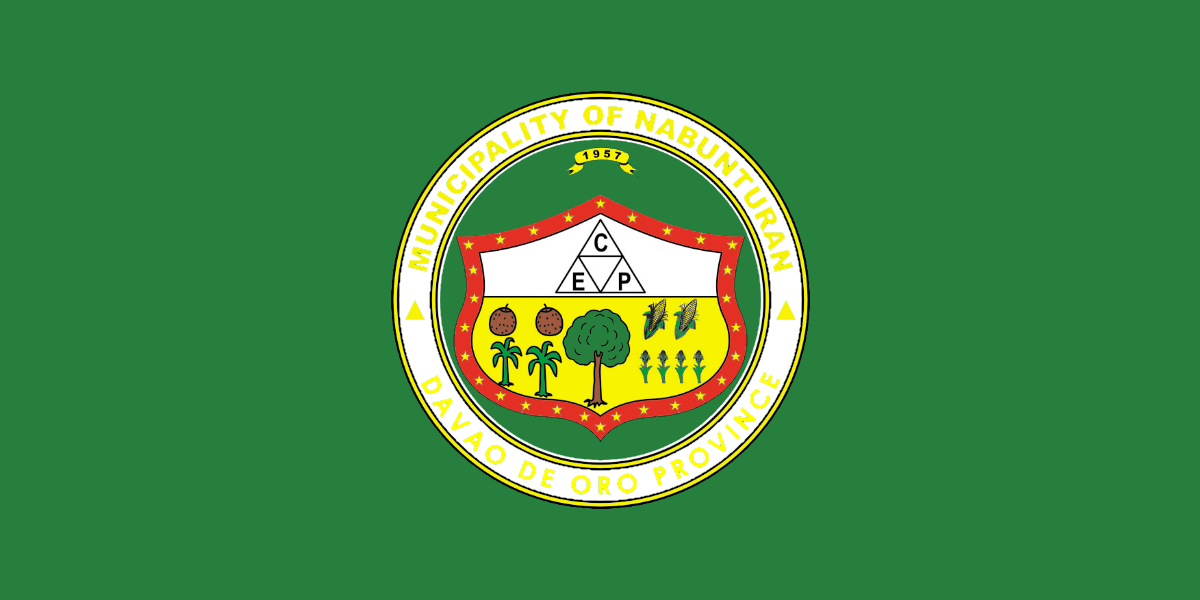
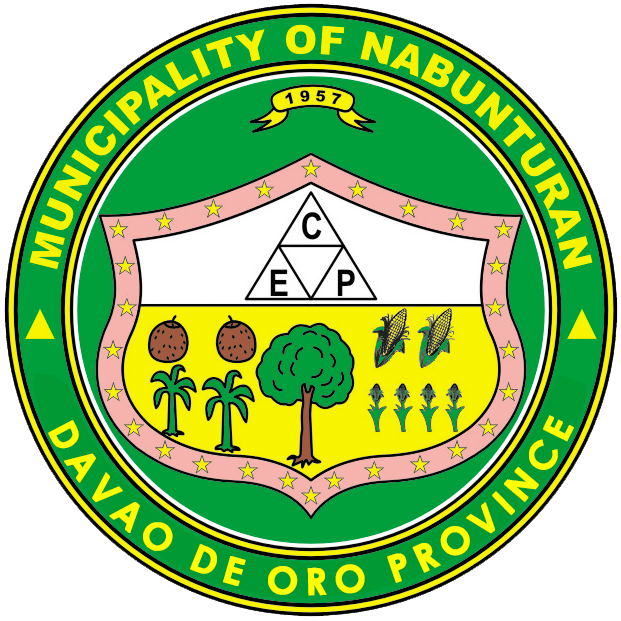
- Flag Seal
- Nicknames: Heart of the Valley; Home of the Biggest Gold Ring in the Philippines; El Dorado FIlipino
- Motto: Nabunturan, A Progressive, Peaceful, and Dynamic Agri-based Municipality
- Anthem: Nabunturan Hymn
- Map of Davao de Oro with Nabunturan highlighted
- Interactive map of Nabunturan
- Location within the Philippines
- Coordinates: 7°36′12″N 125°58′01″E
- Country: Philippines
- Region: Davao Region
- Province: Davao de Oro
- District: 2nd district
- Founded: July 23, 1957
- Barangays: 28 (see Barangays)

Government
  - Type: Sangguniang Bayan
  - Mayor: Myrocel Clarin-Balili
  - Vice Mayor: Cyrian A. Reterba
  - Representative: Leonel D. Ceniza
  - Electorate: 53,977 voters (2025)

Area
  - Total: 231.30 km^{2} (89.31 sq mi)
- Elevation: 127 m (417 ft)
- Highest elevation: 437 m (1,434 ft)
- Lowest elevation: 64 m (210 ft)

Population (2024 census)
  - Total: 85,949
  - Density: 371.59/km^{2} (962.42/sq mi)
  - Households: 20,831
- Demonym: Nabunturanon

Economy
  - Income class: 1st municipal income class
  - Poverty incidence: 11.2% (2023)
  - Revenue: ₱ 459.9 million (2024)
  - Assets: ₱ 834.3 million (2024)
  - Expenditure: ₱ 457.2 million (2024)

Service provider
  - Electricity: Northern Davao Electric Cooperative (NORDECO)
  - Water: Nabunturan Water District
  - Telecommunications: Globe Telecom; PLDT
  - Cable TV: Nabunturan Cable TV Network
- Time zone: UTC+8 (PST)
- ZIP code: 8800
- PSGC: 1108209000
- IDD : area code: +63 (0)87
- Native languages: Davawenyo; Cebuano; Kalagan; Mansaka; Tagalog; Ata Manobo
- Website: nabunturan.gov.ph

Nabunturan, officially the Municipality of Nabunturan (Cebuano: Lungsod sa Nabunturan; Tagalog: Bayan ng Nabunturan), is a municipality and capital of the province of Davao de Oro, Philippines. According to the 2024 census, it has a population of 85,949 people.

The municipality is home to the Mainit Hot Springs Protected Landscape.

== History ==
The town of Nabunturan was once a barangay of Municipality of Compostela. The origin of the name is from bungtod, the Cebuano term for "hill." The word Nabunturan means "surrounded by hills" in English (nabungturan). The early settlement was governed by a headman called Bagani, but was under the supervision of the Municipal District President of Compostela over matters concerning civil affairs. For the maintenance of peace and order, the area was under the immediate supervision of the Philippine Constabulary Detachment of Camp Kalaw, Moncayo. From barangay Jaguimitan in the north to barangay Mawab (now a municipality in the south), the whole Compostela town was divided into two (2) municipal districts: the district of Moncayo, and the district of Compostela, with the latter's seat of local government in barangay Nabunturan, now the municipality of Nabunturan.

Before the construction of the national road traversing Nabunturan, the place was little known; but despite the threat of malaria, which was prevalent at the time, pioneers ventured into the area. Mansaka natives settled their lives here in the municipality of Mawab to Barangay Bangkerohan, Montevista. The original site of Barangay Nabunturan was situated along the Libasan-Saosao Provincial Road, about 4 km from the present Poblacion site. The public school system was under the supervision of the Supervising Teacher stationed in the Kalaw Settlement for schools in the district of Monkayo.

When the road was constructed in 1938, many Visayan settlers and pioneers came to Nabunturan and made it their home. By that time, the establishment of the Bureau of Public Works (BPW) camp settled in Nabunturan. Many business trades and establishments poured in and Nabunturan was established as a rural community.

In 1941, the Second World War broke out in the country. A new hiding place for guerrillas and USAFFE Contingents established in Nabunturan. But during the Japanese occupation in Mindanao, Nabunturan became a Japanese Kempetai Garrison. After the war, the Japanese were repulsed back to Davao City, and the camp regained its status as the center of life and business in Davao de Oro. Camp Kalaw was destroyed and abandoned.

In 1945, American forces landed in Davao City, and the Philippine Civil Assistance Unit (PCAU) established the civil government of Compostela at Nabunturan because of its accessibility to Davao City. By that time, many highways and roads were constructed, and Nabunturan became a center of commerce. Because of this, the need to convert Nabunturan into a municipality was felt. On July 23, 1957, 30 days after the approval and passage of Republic Act no. 2038, a new political unit—separate and distinct from the mother municipality of Compostela—was created. It retained its original name, Nabunturan. The first mayor of the town was Lauro C. Arabejo, the incumbent mayor of the municipality of Compostela.

On January 30, 1998, President Fidel V. Ramos signed into law the creation of the 79th province of the country, Compostela Valley (now named Davao de Oro), pursuant to Rep. Act 8470, which created Nabunturan as its capital town on March 8, 1998. Prospero Amatong, then governor of Davao del Norte province from which the new province of Compostela Valley was carved out, opted to serve as the first governor of the newly created province. He only served for one day, before resigning the following day and filing his candidacy for Congress. He was succeeded by Luz Sarmiento as an appointed governor and served for two months. The first elected governor was Jose R. Caballero who served from July 1, 1998, to June 30, 2007.

== Geography ==
=== Barangays ===
Nabunturan is subdivided into 28 barangays, namely: Each barangay consists of puroks while some have sitios.

- Anislagan
- Antequera
- Basak
- Bayabas
- Bukal
- Cabacungan
- Cabidianan
- Katipunan
- Libasan
- Linda
- Magading
- Magsaysay
- Mainit
- Manat
- Matilo
- Mipangi
- New Dauis
- New Sibonga
- Ogao
- Pangutosan
- Poblacion
- San Isidro
- San Roque
- San Vicente
- Santa Maria
- Santo Niño (Kao)
- Sasa
- Tagnocon

=== Climate ===
Climate data for Nabunturan
Month	Jan	Feb	Mar	Apr	May	Jun	Jul	Aug	Sep	Oct	Nov	Dec	Year
Mean daily maximum °C (°F)	27 (81)	27 (81)	28 (82)	29 (84)	30 (86)	29 (84)	29 (84)	30 (86)	30 (86)	29 (84)	29 (84)	28 (82)	29 (84)
Mean daily minimum °C (°F)	23 (73)	23 (73)	23 (73)	23 (73)	24 (75)	24 (75)	24 (75)	23 (73)	24 (75)	24 (75)	23 (73)	23 (73)	23 (74)
Average precipitation mm (inches)	160 (6.3)	127 (5.0)	96 (3.8)	62 (2.4)	141 (5.6)	197 (7.8)	185 (7.3)	186 (7.3)	183 (7.2)	181 (7.1)	128 (5.0)	111 (4.4)	1,757 (69.2)
Average rainy days	20.0	17.2	15.9	13.9	23.8	27.2	28.1	28.2	27.0	27.0	21.3	18.7	268.3
Source: Meteoblue

== Demographics ==
Population census of Nabunturan
Year	Pop.	±% p.a.
1960	21,860	—
1970	27,689	+2.39%
1975	30,883	+2.21%
1980	37,292	+3.84%
1990	53,410	+3.66%
1995	56,576	+1.08%
2000	60,543	+1.46%
2007	67,365	+1.48%
2010	73,196	+3.07%
2015	82,234	+2.24%
2020	84,340	+0.53%
2024	85,949	+0.45%
Source: Philippine Statistics Authority

In the 2024 census, the population of Nabunturan was 85,949 people, with a density of 370 inhabitants per square kilometre or 960 inhabitants per square mile.

== Economy ==
Poverty incidence of Nabunturan

Source: Philippine Statistics Authority

== Government ==
=== List of former chief executives ===
Local Executives Serving the Municipality of Nabunturan Since 1957–Present
Name of mayor	Years served	Remarks
Lauro C. Arabejo	1957–1959	Not, who continued his two unexpired term as Mayor of Compostela
Antonio A. Tulio	1960–1963	Served until September 11, 1963 only because he ran for Provincial Board
Gregorio Echavez	Four Months	Served as Mayor on September 12, 1964 being as Vice Mayor.
Lauro C. Arabejo	1964–1967	Served as Mayor for the whole term
Lauro C. Arabejo	1968–1969	Served as Mayor until 1969 because he ran for Congressman
Venancio C. Piastro	1969–1971	Served as Mayor from September 1969 to 1971 being as Vice Mayor
Prospero S. Amatong	1972–1977	Served as Mayor from January 1, 1972, to September 28, 1977, after his courtesy resignation was accepted by then President Marcos.
Zosimo A. Bugas	1977–1980	Appointed and served as mayor from September 29, 1977 to March 2, 1980
Prospero S. Amatong	1980–1986	Served as Mayor until March 31, 1986, only because he was appointed as OIC Governor.
Venancio C. Piastro	15 Days	Served as Mayor from April 1, 1986, to April 15, 1986 for being as Vice Mayor
Arsenio B. Flores	1986–1988	Appointed and served as OIC Mayor from April 16, 1986, to January 26, 1988
Romeo A. Chavez, MD	5 days	Appointed and served as Mayor from January 27, 1988, to February 1, 1988
Joel O. Bugas	1988–1992	Served as Mayor for the whole term
Joel O. Bugas	1992–1995	Re-elected as Mayor during the 1992 national and local elections
Joel O. Bugas	1995–1998	Re-elected as Mayor during the 1995 national and local elections
Ruben R. Flores MD	1998–2001	Served as Mayor for the whole term
Macario T. Humol	2001–2004	Served as Mayor for the whole term
Macario T. Humol	2004–2007	Re-elected as Mayor during the 2004 national and local elections
Macario T. Humol	2007–2010	Re-elected as Mayor during the 2007 national and local elections
Romeo C. Clarin	2010–2016	Served as Mayor of Nabunturan
Chelita C. Amatong	2016–2022	Served as Mayor of Nabunturan
Myrocel C. Balili	2022–present	Currently elected as Mayor of Nabunturan

== Media ==
=== Radio stations and cable provider ===
- DXPA-FM 103.1 Radyo Serbisyo – Owned By Andres Bonifacio College Broadcasting System
- DXWH-FM 104.7 Radyo Natin – Owned by Manila Broadcasting Company ( operator . AJT production and media services )
- DXKY-FM 88.5 Zradio – Owned by 1st District Congressman Manuel "Way Kurat" Zamora under the license by RMC Broadcasting Corporation of the Radyo ni Juan Network
- Nabunturan Cable TV Network (NCTN) – owned By Jainal B. Uy
- 97.9 AFM Nabunturan owned by Mr. Alexander Petalcorin Agustin
- 94.3 Juander Radyo Nabunturan (RSV Broadcasting Network Inc.) owned by Richard S. Villaronte
