= DXEV =

Infinite Radio Mati (DXEV)
- Mati; Philippines
- Broadcast area: Davao Oriental, parts of Davao de Oro
- Frequency: 107.9 MHz
- Branding: 107.9 Dino Infinite Radio

Programming
- Languages: Cebuano, Filipino
- Format: Contemporary MOR, OPM, Talk
- Network: Infinite Radio

Ownership
- Owner: St. Jude Thaddeus Institute of Technology

History
- First air date: 2024
- Former frequencies: 101.5 MHz (2024-2025)

Technical information
- Licensing authority: NTC
- Power: 5,000 watts

DXEV (107.9 FM), broadcasting as 107.9 Dino Infinite Radio, is a radio station owned and operated by St. Jude Thaddeus Institute of Technology. The studio is located along Rizal Ext., Mati, Davao Oriental.
