= Digos =

Capital city of Davao del Sur, Philippines

- Component city
- City of Digos
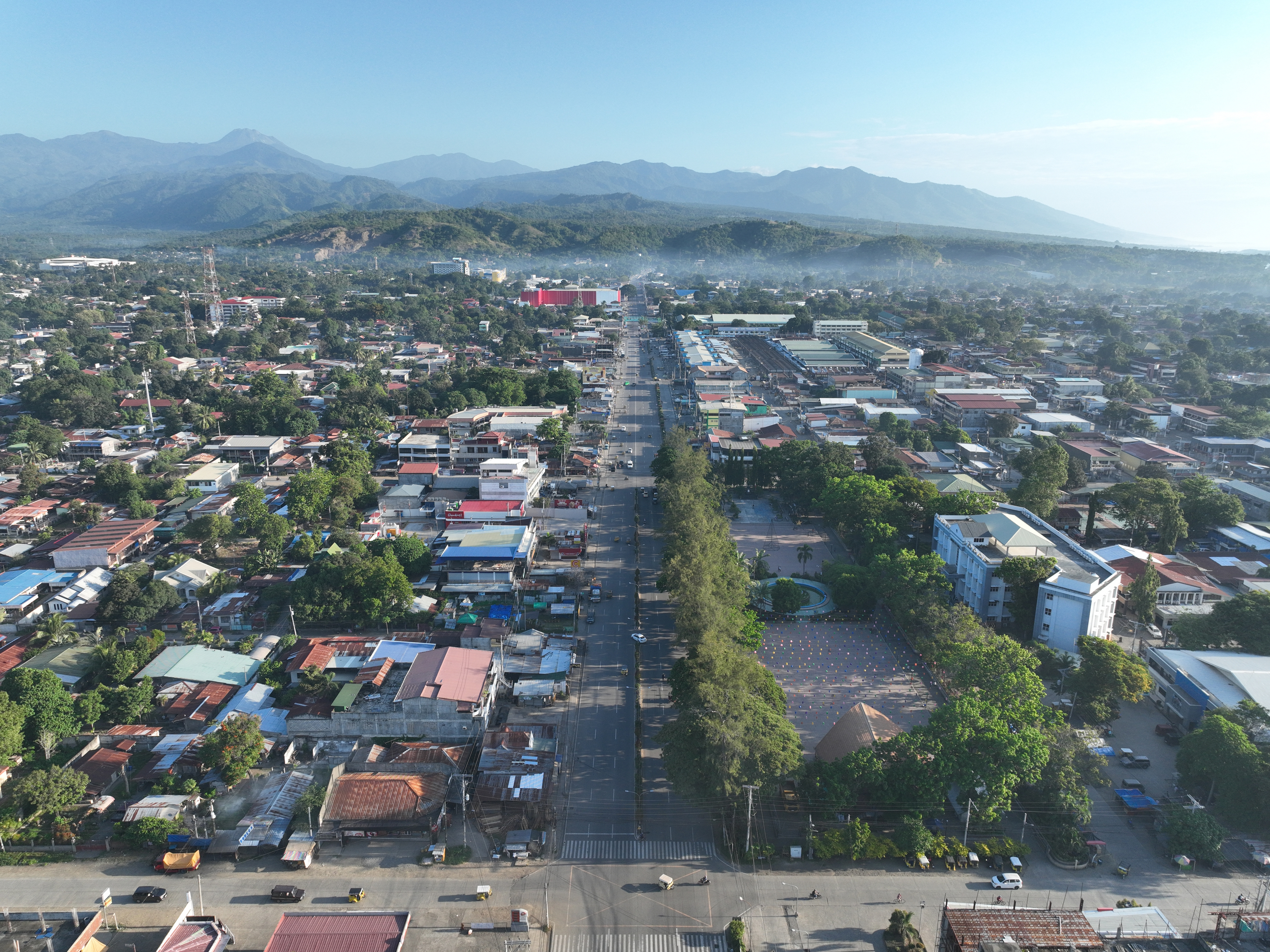
- Skyline

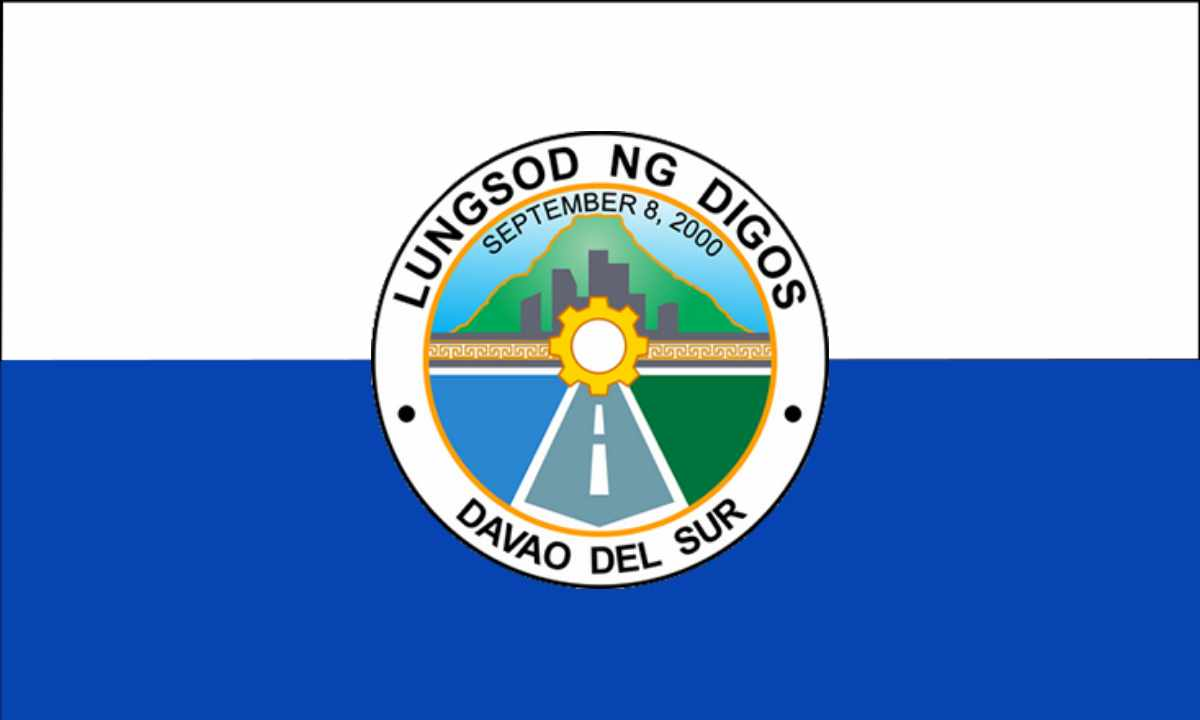
- Flag Seal

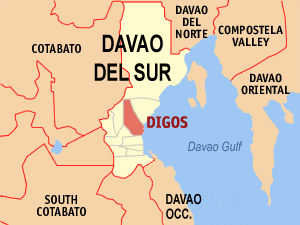
- Map of Davao del Sur with Digos highlighted
- Interactive map of Digos
- Location within the Philippines
- Coordinates: 6°44′43″N 125°21′21″E
- Country: Philippines
- Region: Davao Region
- Province: Davao del Sur
- District: Lone district
- Founded: July 19, 1949
- Cityhood: September 8, 2000
- Barangays: 26 (see Barangays)

Government
  - Type: Sangguniang Panlungsod
  - Mayor: Josef F. Cagas (Independent)
  - Vice Mayor: Johari G. Baña (Independent)
  - Representative: John Tracy F. Cagas (NP)
  - City Council: Members: Gary R. Cagas; Reynaldo T. Aballe; Millennium P. Garcia; Rey Q. Ayo; Xymber M. Latasa; Ramil Ian C. Llanos; Francisco B. Tongcos; Salvador L. Dumogho III; Marc Dominic R. Fernandez; Concepcion R. Cadungog
  - Electorate: 117,797 voters (2025)

Area
  - Total: 287.10 km^{2} (110.85 sq mi)
- Elevation: 190 m (620 ft)
- Highest elevation: 1,979 m (6,493 ft)
- Lowest elevation: 0 m (0 ft)

Population (2024 census)
  - Total: 192,063
  - Density: 668.98/km^{2} (1,732.6/sq mi)
  - Households: 47,948
- Demonym: Digoseño

Economy
  - Income class: 1st city income class
  - Poverty incidence: 10.06% (2023)
  - Revenue: ₱ 1,567 million (2024)
  - Assets: ₱ 3,329 million (2024)
  - Expenditure: ₱ 1,425 million (2024)
  - Liabilities: ₱ 1,240 million (2024)

Service provider
  - Electricity: Davao del Sur Electric Cooperative (DASURECO)
- Time zone: UTC+8 (PST)
- ZIP code: 8002
- PSGC: 112403000
- IDD : area code: +63 (0)82
- Native languages: Davawenyo; Cebuano; Obo; Kalagan; Tagalog; Ata Manobo
- Website: www.digoscity.gov.ph

Digos, officially the City of Digos (Cebuano: Dakbayan sa Digos; Filipino: Lungsod ng Digos), is a component city and capital of the province of Davao del Sur, Philippines. According to the 2024 census, it has a population of 192,063 people.

The city lies on the western shores of Davao Gulf and southern foothills of Mount Apo on the island of Mindanao, centrally located between the three major cities in Mindanao, Davao City in the north, General Santos in the south and Cotabato City in the west.

It is the second most populous city in Davao del Sur after the highly-urbanized city of Davao as well as the fourth most populous city in Davao Region, and it is also considered as part of Metropolitan Davao.

It is known for its sweet-juicy 'carabao variety mango,' sold locally and exported abroad, thus being dubbed as the Mango Capital City of the Philippines. It is also considered as The Gate City Of The South.

On September 8, 2000, Digos was converted into a city.

== History ==
In the early days, Digos was a watercourse, a meeting place of inhabitants belonging to the Austronesians who settled along the southern foothills of Mount Apo. The Digos River meets Davao Gulf and it is ideal for fishing and bathing.

Digos was once part of the Sultanate of Maguindanao. During the 1800s, it was under the influence of Datu Bago, a Maguindanaon datu who led the resistance in Davao Region against the Spanish Empire.

During the Spanish Era, a group of natives carrying bows and arrows were approached by some Spaniards traversing the very fertile tracts of land in Davao. One Lopez Jaena Pacheco, a conquistador during the administration of Governor Claveria serving as the head of the group, inquired about the name of the place from the barefooted natives. Believing that the Spaniards were asking where they were bound to, the natives answered "Padigus", which means "to take a bath". Since then the place was identified as Digos.

As a portion of the "food bowl" of the province of Davao del Sur, otherwise known as the Padada Valley, Digos lured many migrants, majority of whom came from the Visayas and Ilocos regions to settle permanently in the area. Before World War II, an enterprising American by the name of N.E. Crumb leased 10.24 km^{2} and transformed the place into an Abaca Plantation. This became the hub of economic activity in the locality during those days.

Digos was occupied by the Japanese troops in 1942.

In 1945, through the brave efforts of the combined forces of the Philippine Commonwealth Army, the local Davaoeño guerrilla units from the Davao peninsula, and the United States military, the Japanese soldiers were defeated.

Through the initiation of Davao Congressman Apolinario Cabigon, Digos, became a regular municipality of the unified Davao in 1949 by virtue of Presidential Executive Order No. 236, dated July 1, 1949, issued by President Elpidio Quirino. Its coverage included the barrios of Tres de Mayo, Goma Bansalan, Matanao, Darapuay and the Poblacion, where the seat of government was located. Before its creation into a municipality, Digos was a barrio of Santa Cruz, a town 16 kilometers (9.9 mi) away. On July 19, 1949, the town was formally inaugurated with Benito Rabor appointed as Mayor.

On May 8, 1967, the municipality became part of Davao del Sur following Davao's division under Republic Act No. 4867.

Digos in later years, before its conversion into a city, was regarded as the capital town of the Province of Davao del Sur, long before it gained the status of a First-Class Municipality in 1993, being center for trade, commerce and education, accruing to its strategic location at the cross point of two principal thoroughfares in the south.

=== Cityhood ===
In July 1998, the bid to convert into a city was moved and initiated by Mayor Arsenio A. Latasa, considering its very satisfactory qualifications required for in R.A. 7160

House Bill No. 5672 dated November 24, 1998, of Congress authored by Davao Del Sur 1st district Congressman Douglas Cagas, led to the drafting of Republic Act No. 8798, converting the Municipality of Digos into a component City of Davao del Sur, which was signed by President Joseph Estrada on July 14, 2000, and ratified by the Digoseños on September 8, 2000.

== Geography ==
Digos shares common boundaries with the municipalities of Hagonoy in the south, Bansalan in the north and northwest by Siranagan and Miral Creek and with Santa Cruz in the northeast. It is bounded in the east by Davao Gulf. It has a total land area of 28,710 hectares (70,900 acres) consisting of 26 barangays; nine (9) of which comprise the poblacion or urban center.

The land topography of Digos ranges from hilly to mountainous in the north-northeast portion and flat and slightly rolling at the coastal barangays, while the urban area and the surrounding barangays in the south portion are generally flat. Generally, climate in Digos falls under the fourth type while wind direction is prevalent from northeast to southwest. On the other hand, rainfall is evenly distributed throughout the year wherein during the period from 1995 to 2000, there was no observed extreme dry or wet season.

=== Climate ===
Climate data for Digos
Month	Jan	Feb	Mar	Apr	May	Jun	Jul	Aug	Sep	Oct	Nov	Dec	Year
Mean daily maximum °C (°F)	30 (86)	30 (86)	31 (88)	32 (90)	31 (88)	30 (86)	29 (84)	30 (86)	30 (86)	30 (86)	30 (86)	29 (84)	30 (86)
Mean daily minimum °C (°F)	23 (73)	23 (73)	23 (73)	24 (75)	24 (75)	24 (75)	24 (75)	24 (75)	24 (75)	24 (75)	23 (73)	22 (72)	24 (74)
Average precipitation mm (inches)	59 (2.3)	46 (1.8)	41 (1.6)	54 (2.1)	105 (4.1)	159 (6.3)	179 (7.0)	197 (7.8)	162 (6.4)	147 (5.8)	102 (4.0)	65 (2.6)	1,316 (51.8)
Average rainy days	13	11.7	12.2	14.5	22.6	25.6	26.6	27.5	25.5	26.0	21.2	16.0	242.4
Source: Meteoblue

=== Barangays ===
Digos is politically subdivided into 26 barangays. Each barangay consists of puroks while some have sitios.

- Aplaya
- Balabag
- San Jose (Balutakay)
- Binaton
- Cogon
- Colorado
- Dawis
- Dulangan
- Goma
- Igpit
- Kiagot
- Lungag
- Mahayahay
- Matti
- Kapatagan (Rizal)
- Ruparan
- San Agustin
- San Miguel (Odaca)
- San Roque
- Sinawilan
- Soong
- Tiguman
- Tres De Mayo
- Zone 1 (Pob.)
- Zone 2 (Pob.)
- Zone 3 (Pob.)

== Demographics ==
Population census of Digos
Year	Pop.	±% p.a.
1960	31,174	—
1970	47,588	+4.32%
1975	59,533	+4.59%
1980	70,065	+3.31%
1990	96,806	+3.29%
1995	106,565	+1.82%
2000	125,171	+3.51%
2007	145,514	+2.10%
2010	149,891	+1.08%
2015	169,393	+2.36%
2020	188,376	+2.26%
2024	192,063	+0.47%
Source: Philippine Statistics Authority

== Economy ==
Poverty incidence of Digos (%)

Source: Philippine Statistics Authority

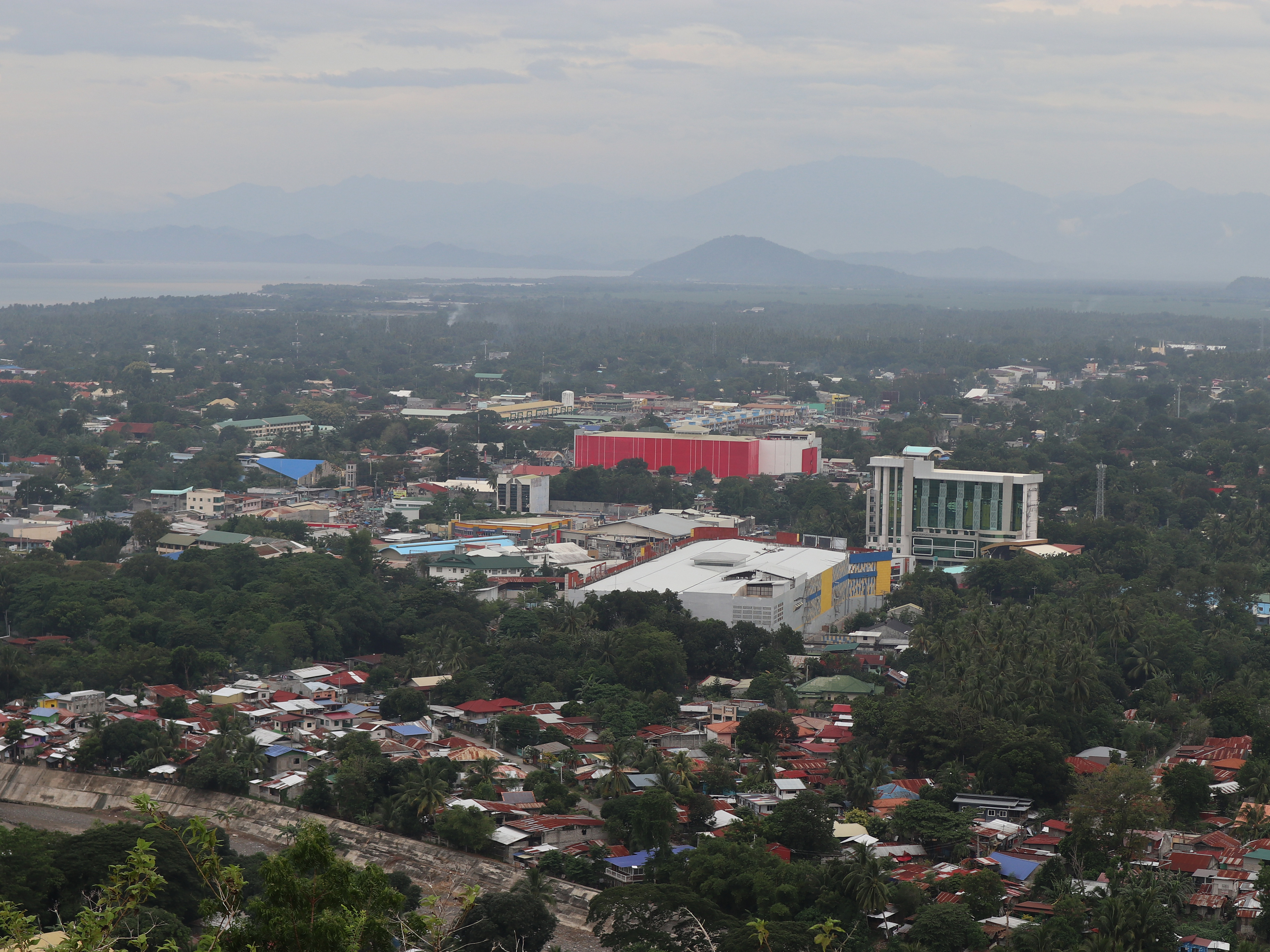
View of Digos

Agriculture is a major component of Digos's economy. Some 9,330 households or 37% of the total households are dependent on agriculture for their livelihood. Of the total households dependent on agriculture, 91% are engaged in farming and the remaining 9% in fishing. The total area devoted to agriculture covered 8,944.1 hectares (22,101 acres), representing 31% of the total land area of Digos. The more important agricultural crops grown in the area include coconut, sugarcane, mango and banana. Among the agricultural crops, the staple crops rice and corn are the most widely grown.

== Government ==
Digos City Hall

=== Elected officials ===
Members of the Digos City Council (2022–2025):

- Mayor: Josef Cagas
- Vice Mayor: Johari Baña
- City Councilors:
  - Liza M. Cagas
  - Reynaldo T. Aballe
  - Xymber M .Latasa
  - Michael R. Latasa
  - Ferdinand D. Canastra
  - Marc Dominic R. Fernandez
  - Salvador L. Dumogho, III.
  - Concepcion R. Cadungog
  - Nestor M. Aldeguer, Jr.
  - Reynaldo S. Hermosisima
  - Juanito O. Morales (ABC President)
  - Linda E. Regidor (IPMR)
  - Lolemeir John Egos (SK Fed President)

== Culture ==
=== Fiestas and festivals ===
- Sinulog sa Digos - every January 15
- San Isidrio Labrador - every May 15
- Padigosan Festival - every July 19
- Mary Mediatrix - every August 22
- Araw ng Digos - every September 8
- GKK/BEC (Gagmay'ng Kristohanong Katilingban/Basic Ecclesial Community) Fiestas - Depends on the feast day of the patron saint.

== Infrastructure ==
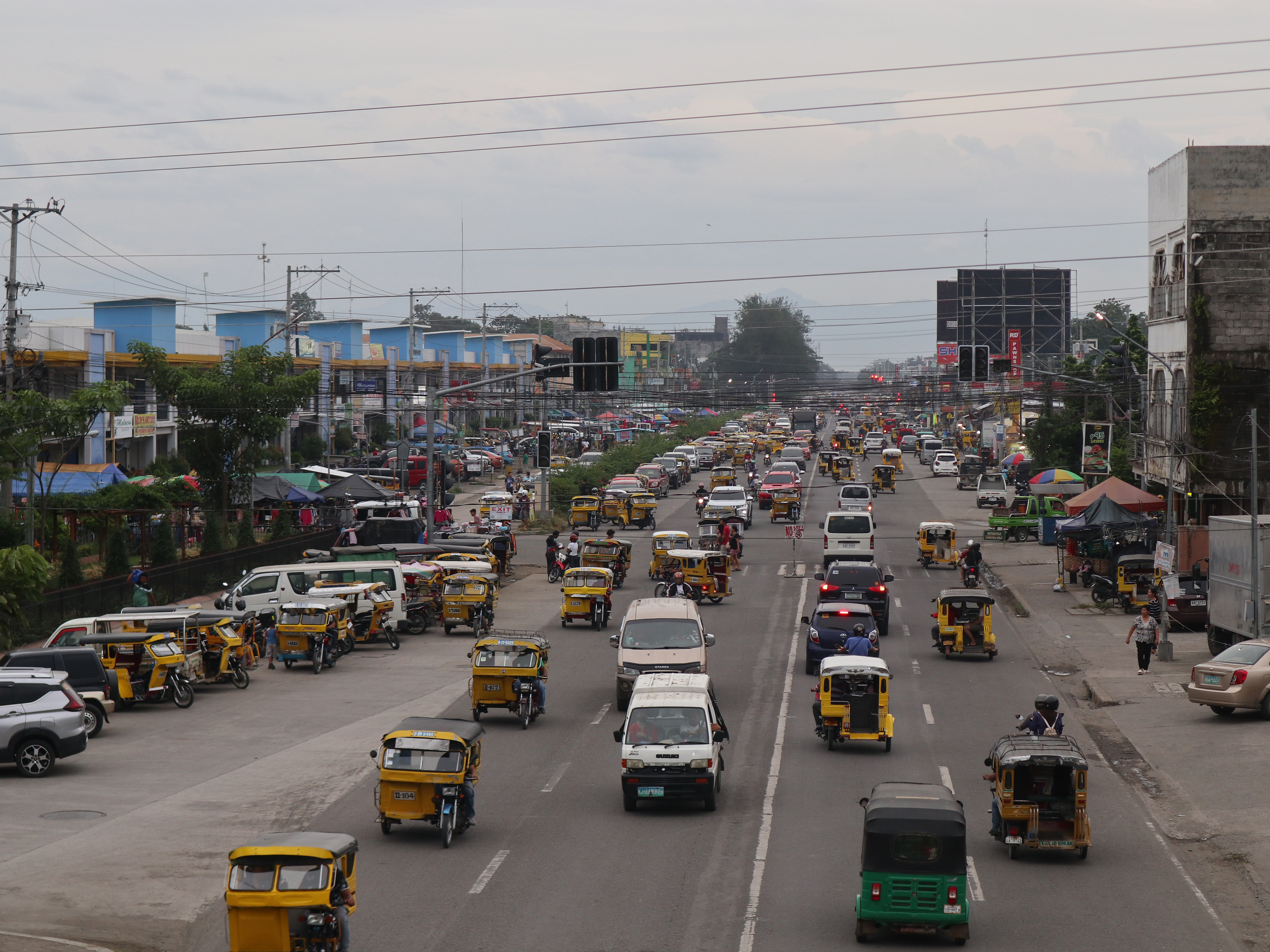
Intersection of Rizal Avenue (Pan-Philippine Highway) and Roxas Street in the city proper

=== Transportation ===
Local means of transportation is served by almost 5,000 tricycles known locally as "pedicab". Transportation to its barangays and adjacent municipalities are served by single motorcycles (skylab/habal-habal), multicabs, jeepneys, and L300 vans. Public utility vans also served routes to and from the cities of Davao, Cotabato, Kidapawan, Tacurong-Isulan, Koronadal and General Santos.

Bus companies operating in the city of Digos:

- Mindanao Star (General Santos, Davao City & Cotabato City)
- Davao Metro Shuttle (Tagum City)
- Yellow Bus Lines Inc. (General Santos/Koronadal City)
- Grand Transport Corp. (Tacurong City)
- SEMTRAMPCO (Digos)
- Tacurong Express (Tacurong City)
- Davao ACF Bus Line (Malita, Davao del Sur)

=== Hospitals/healthcare facilities ===
- Digos Doctors Hospital
- CM Torregosa Birthing Home and Woman Center
- Medical Center Of Digos Cooperative
- Gonzales-Maranan Clinics & Hospital
- Davao del Sur Provincial Hospital
- Dominican Hospital
- Sunga Hospital
- Llanos Medical Clinic & Hospital
- Paulino Hospital
- Masongsong Clinic & Hospital
- Davao del Sur Medical Specialist
- Digos Medical Multi-test
- Bethlehem Birthing Center
- Monarca Lying Inn Clinic
- Mayor's Birthing Place
- Kayden-Blaise Birthing Home

== Education ==
Public and private schools in Digos:

=== Tertiary ===
- Cor Jesu College (private, catholic)
- University of Mindanao Digos Campus (private, non-sectarian)
- Polytechnic College of Davao del Sur (private)
- Davao del Sur State College (DSSC/SPAMAST) - Digos Campus (public)
- John Paul II Seminary (theological school, Diocese of Digos)
- PRIME Innovations, Technical and Vocational School [PITVS] (Private, Non-Sectarian)
- Southern Mindanao Computer College (private)
- Philippine International Technological School (private)
- Adventure College Of Technology And Science (private)
- Mindanao Technological Institute (private)
- Digital Systems Institute (private)
- Digos Institute Of Technical Education (private)

=== Secondary ===
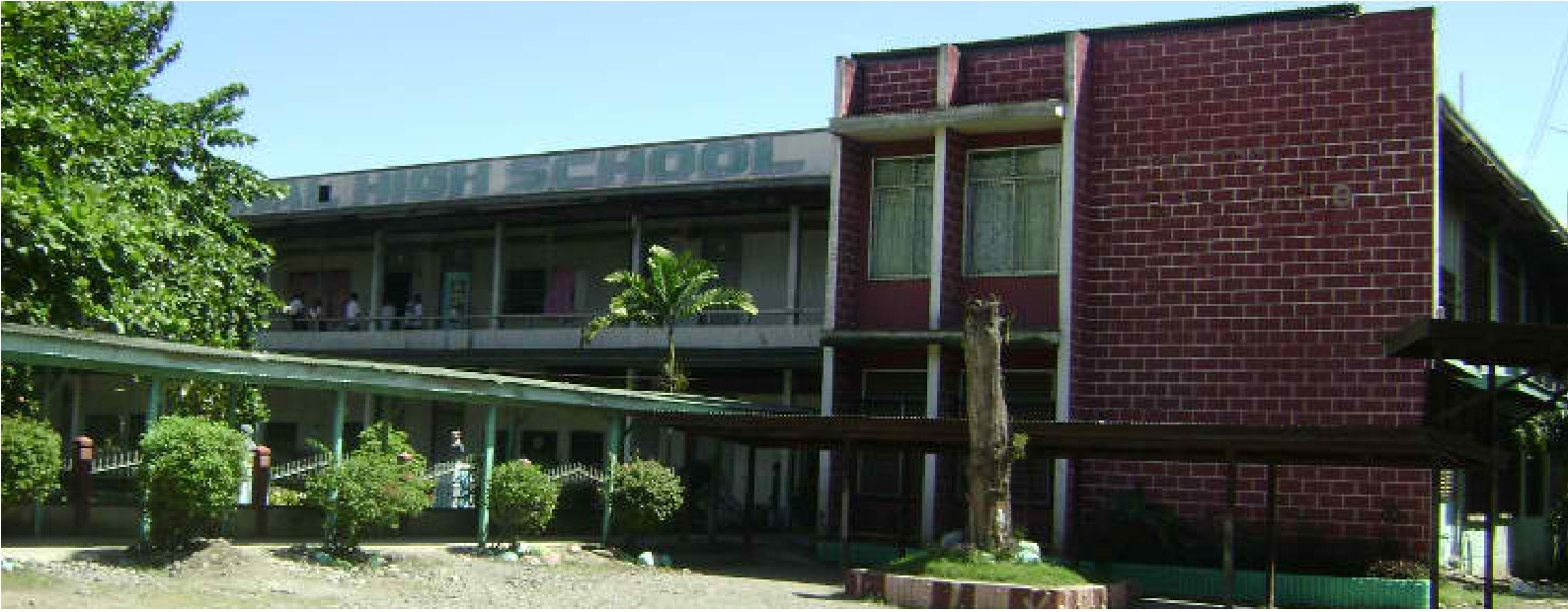
Digos City National High School

- Digos City National High School
- Cor Jesu College High School Department
- Holy Cross Academy Inc.
- The Lighthouse Accelerated Christian School
- Polytechnic College of Davao del Sur High School Department
- Kapatagan National High School
- Aplaya National High School
- Ruparan National High School
- Soong National High School
- Igpit National High School
- Digos City National High School - Balabag High School Annex
- Digos Central Adventist Academy - Lapu-Lapu Ext.
- Matti National High School
- Palan Bagobo-Tagabawa National High School
- Saver's Technological College of Davao Inc.

== Notable personalities ==
- Esnyr - social media influencer
- KZ Tandingan - singer
- Wilbert Ross - actor and singer
