= Metro Davao =

Metropolitan area in the Philippines

Metro Davao Kaulohang Dabaw (Cebuano)
- Metropolitan area
- Metropolitan Davao
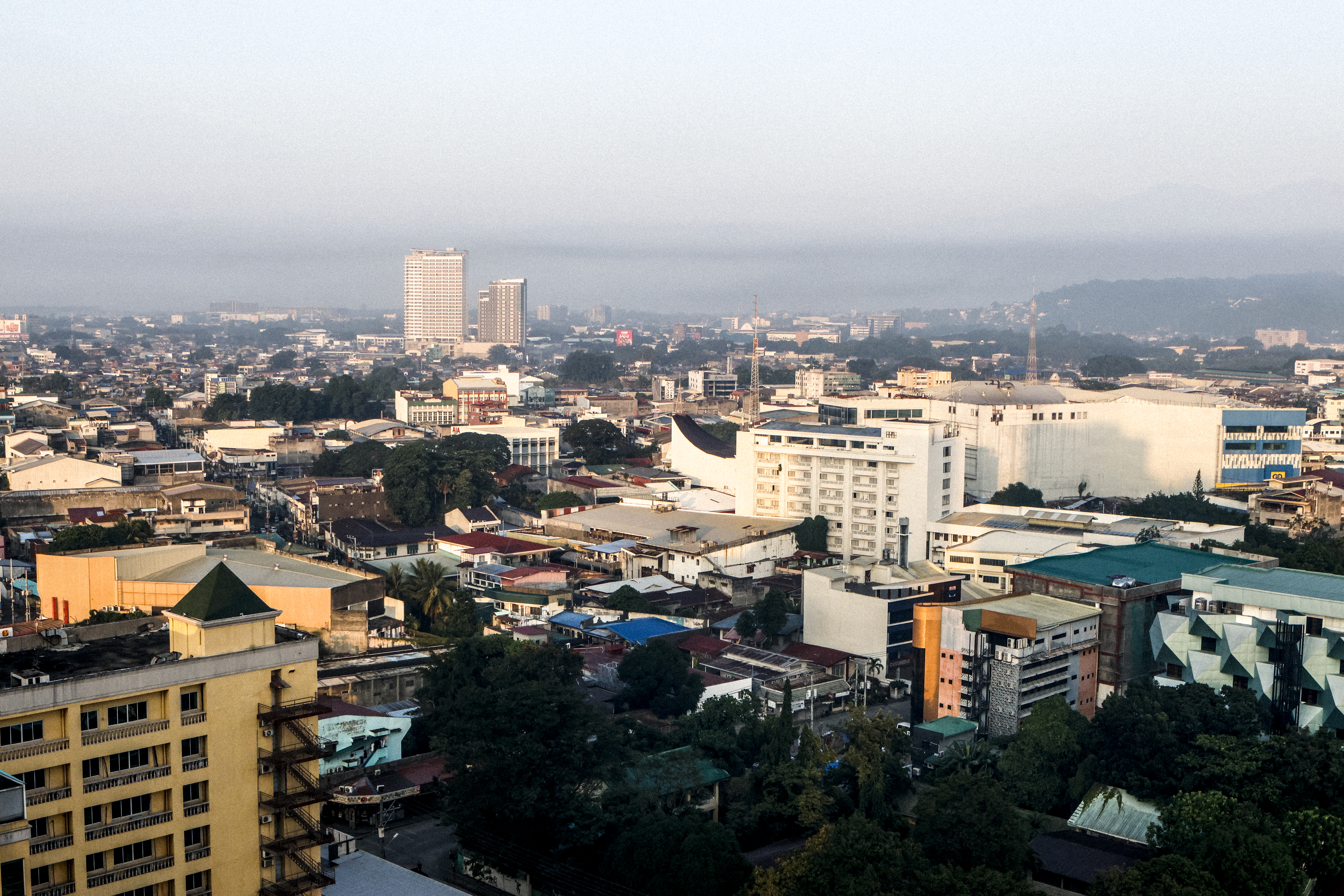
- Skyline of Davao City at daytime
- Interactive map of Metro Davao
- Coordinates: 7°04′N 125°36′E
- Country: Philippines
- Region: Davao Region (Region XI)
- Province(s): Davao del Norte; Davao de Oro; Davao del Sur; Davao Occidental
- Managing entity: Metropolitan Davao Development Authority
- Established: 1995 (as metropolitan area); 2022 (as administrative area)
- Cities and Municipalities: 15

Area
  - Total: 6,492.84 km^{2} (2,506.90 sq mi)

Population (2020)
  - Total: 3,339,284
  - Density: 514.303/km^{2} (1,332.04/sq mi)

Divisions
  - Highly urbanized cities: 1: Davao City
  - Component cities: 5: Digos; Mati; Panabo; Samal; Tagum
  - Municipalities: 9: Carmen; Hagonoy; Maco; Malalag; Malita; Padada; Sta. Cruz; Sta. Maria; Sulop
- Time zone: UTC+8 (PST)

Metro Davao, officially Metropolitan Davao (Cebuano: Kaulohang Dabaw; Filipino: Kalakhang Davao), is a metropolitan area in Mindanao, Philippines. It includes the cities of Davao, Digos, Mati, Panabo, Samal and Tagum and spans parts of all five provinces of the Davao Region. Metro Davao is one of three metropolitan areas in the Philippines. It is administered by the Metropolitan Davao Development Authority. It is the largest metropolitan region by land area and the second most populous in the Philippines.

== History ==
=== Comparison with other metropolitan areas ===
The agglomeration of Metro Davao has no formal legal framework early on its initial stage of development process either by an act of Congress, by an executive declaration of the president or by a formal agreement among component cities and municipalities of the metropolitan area.

In the case of Metro Manila, the component cities and municipalities were grouped into a province through a decree issued by then-President Ferdinand Marcos, and designated the then First Lady Imelda Marcos as a governess. From then on, Greater Manila, as it was known earlier, became Metro Manila.

To formalize its juridical identity, Congress passed into law Republic Act No. 7924, instituting the Metropolitan Manila Development Authority. Under the current law, the head of the agency shall be appointed by the President and should not be on a concurrent elected position as mayor.

Metro Cebu is a concept created in the 70's and formally adopted by the Regional Development Council of Central Visayas as a platform for integrating parallel development in the metropolitan area.

=== Formation of the metropolitan area ===
Although Metro Davao was formed in 1995 by then-mayor of Davao City (and later president) Rodrigo Duterte, it does not have the birth perspective of either Metro Cebu or Metro Manila. The metropolitan concept of Metro Davao is being spearheaded by the mayor but no formal agreement or an act of congress have been executed to formalize its legal and juridical identity. Because of this, the region, having no official legal framework (although they have a de facto one, the Davao Regional Development Council), exists not as a juridical identity but only as an informal reference to the area. However, the said council have formally adopted the concept in 1996 for the development of the area, especially Davao City.

Twenty-seven years later, as president, Duterte signed Republic Act No. 11708 on April 27, 2022, paving the way for the establishment of the Metro Davao Development Authority which would oversee the administration and planning in the metropolitan area.

== Government ==
Metropolitan Davao Development Authority
- Abbreviation: MDDA

Agency overview
- Formed: May 24, 2022

Jurisdictional structure
- Operations jurisdiction: Philippines
- Legal jurisdiction: Metro Davao
- Governing body: Metropolitan Davao Development Council

Prior to the creation of the Metropolitan Davao Development Authority in 2022, Metro Davao had its three own development and governance councils, namely: Davao Integrated Development Program Board, Metropolitan Davao Committee, and Metropolitan Davao Management Office. Davao Integrated Development Program Board served as the metropolitan area's development council, since Metro Davao not only defines the LGUs in the said metropolitan area, but also all of Davao Region. As such, it was not an administrative political unit but an agglomeration of independent local government units, the third level government in the Philippine political system. With Republic Act No. 11708 signed into effect in 2022 however, the then newly created Metropolitan Davao Development Authority will replace the provisional entities that are overseeing the affairs of the metropolis, thus effectively turning Metro Davao into an administrative political unit in the same level as Metro Manila. It is considered to be a special development and administrative region.

=== Definitions of Metro Davao ===
As the years passed, the definitions of Metro Davao have changed in recent years. The following are the three identical geographical definitions:

- The metropolitan area is synonymous with Davao City itself, which is the largest city in the Philippines by land area (2,443.61 ha (9.4348 sq mi)). The entire city is ten times the size of Metro Manila and five times the size of Metro Cebu.
- The metropolitan area encompasses the cities of Davao, Digos, Mati, Panabo, Tagum and Samal, along with the municipalities of Santa Cruz, Hagonoy, Padada, Malalag, Sulop, Carmen, Maco, Malita, and Santa Maria
- The metropolitan area extends beyond Davao City to encompass its nearby five provinces: Davao de Oro, Davao del Norte, Davao del Sur, and Davao Occidental, (Note: Metro Davao, under the third definition, has some form of policy and management structure already in place through the Davao Integrated Development Program Board.) essentially covering the entirety of the Davao Region

=== Component local government units ===
- Highly urbanized city
- Component city
- Municipality

Local government unit	Population (2020)	Area (km^{2})	Pop. density (per km^{2})
Davao City	1,776,949	2,443.61	727.2
Digos	188,376	287.10	656.1
Mati	147,547	588.63	250.7
Panabo	209,230	251.23	734.8
Samal	116,771	301.30	387.6
Tagum	296,202	195.80	1,330.5
Carmen	82,018	166.00	449.9
Hagonoy	56,919	114.28	498.1
Maco	83,237	342.23	284.4
Malalag	40,158	186.12	215.8
Malita	118,197	883.37	133.8
Padada	29,878	83.00	360.0
Santa Cruz	101,125	319.91	284.4
Santa Maria	57,526	175.00	328.7
Sulop	35,151	155.26	226.4
Total	3,339,284	6,492.84	622.6

== Geography and demographics ==
The metropolitan area has 6,492.84 km^{2}, making it the largest metropolitan area in the Philippines in terms of land area. It also has a population of 3,339,284 in the combined population sizes of the local government units that make up the metropolitan area during the 2020 census, making it the second most populous metropolitan area in the country after Metro Manila and Metro Cebu and the most populous in the entire Mindanao region.

=== Languages ===
Most of the region's inhabitants, originally mostly descended from migrant settlers from Visayas and Luzon in recent centuries and decades, mostly speak Davaoeño Cebuano Bisaya vernacularly, whereas English is the primary formal medium of instruction in schools, besides Filipino (Tagalog) class, and is widely understood by residents, who often use it in varying professional fields. Aside from Davaoeño Cebuano Bisaya, Tagalog, Hiligaynon, and Chavacano Davaoeño are also widely casually used in Metro Davao in addition to languages indigenous to Davao City, such as Giangan, Kalagan, Tagabawa, Matigsalug, Ata Manobo, and Obo. Other languages also varyingly spoken in the main city include Maguindanao, Maranao, Sama-Bajau, Iranun, Tausug, Kapampangan and Ilocano. Among Chinese Filipinos and Japanese Filipinos in Davao, Philippine Hokkien and Japanese can also be heard privately used among their fellows. Mandarin (Standard Chinese) and Japanese is also taught in Chinese class and Japanese class of Chinese FIlipino schools and Japanese Nikkei schools respectively.

A linguistic phenomenon has developed in Metro Davao whereby some Cebuano-speaking locals have started integrating Tagalog-based lexicon to their everyday conversations. Numerous factors are behind this, such as the normalcy older generations to speak Tagalog towards their children in the household, the presence of migrant settlers and visitors from various areas in the country, particularly from Luzon, and the mass media and education where people learn Tagalog-based terms, phrases, words, and grammar. While Cebuano language is still primarily spoken in the metro, due to these factors, Tagalog is considered a secondary casual lingua franca.

== Economy ==
The economy of Metro Davao is one of the largest in the country and the most economically active in Mindanao. Davao City, from which the metropolitan area is centered, is known as the Crown Jewel of Mindanao due to its status as the premier city, the financial and trade center, and the overall hub of Mindanao.

There are several industrial and business establishments within the metropolitan area as well. Industrial plants in Davao City, Santa Cruz, and Digos generate income for their respective LGUs as well as for the locals living there. Banana plantations in the northern part of the metropolitan area also contribute to the metropolitan, as well as the national, economy. Local fruits such as durians, mangoes, pineapples, and mangosteens are also exported abroad.

=== List of LGUs in Metro Davao by annual income ===
City/Municipality	Annual Income as of 2022 (₱)	Income Classification as of 2010
Davao City	17,169,476,000.00	1st income class highly urbanized city
Tagum	2,262,919,000.00	1st income class component city
Panabo	1,818,050,000.00	3rd income class component city
Mati	1,803,292,000.00	5th income class component city
Digos	1,551,233,000.00	2nd income class component city
Samal	1,396,221,000.00	4th income class component city
Malita	799,090,000.00	1st income class municipality
Santa Cruz	628,185,000.00	1st income class municipality
Maco	553,069,000.00	1st income class municipality
Carmen	441,376,000.00	1st income class municipality
Santa Maria	299,732,000.00	2nd income class municipality
Sulop	292,970,000.00	3rd income class municipality
Malalag	274,793,000.00	2nd income class municipality
Hagonoy	261,196,000.00	3rd income class municipality
Padada	191,914,000.00	3rd income class municipality
Total	29,743,516,000.00	

=== Agriculture ===
Davao City is one of the country's leading producers and exporters of durian, mangoes, pomeloes, banana, coconut products, papaya, mangosteen, and even flowers. Panabo hosts one of the country's biggest banana plantations, which is owned by the Tagum Agricultural Development Company (TADECO) that covers around 6,900 hectares of banana fields. Digos is popular for the mangoes produced in the city.

== Infrastructure ==
=== Transportation ===
Air

Metro Davao, as a whole, is being served by Davao City's Francisco Bangoy International Airport. It is the largest and the most developed airport on the island of Mindanao. It comes second for having the longest runway on the island at 3,000 meters after that of General Santos International Airport. The airport is currently the third busiest airport in the country after Ninoy Aquino International Airport and Mactan–Cebu International Airport, and the busiest in Mindanao. This international facility is one of the domestic hubs of Philippines AirAsia, Cebu Pacific Air, and Philippine Airlines. Presently, the airport serves flights to Manila, Cebu, Iloilo, Cagayan de Oro, Zamboanga, Pampanga, Bacolod, Tagbilaran, Tacloban, Puerto Princesa, Caticlan and as far as Singapore, Hong Kong, Quanzhou (suspended), and Doha. In 2006, airport officials described the new Air Traffic Control tower as the most advanced in the Philippines at the time, surpassing the facilities at NAIA.

Sea

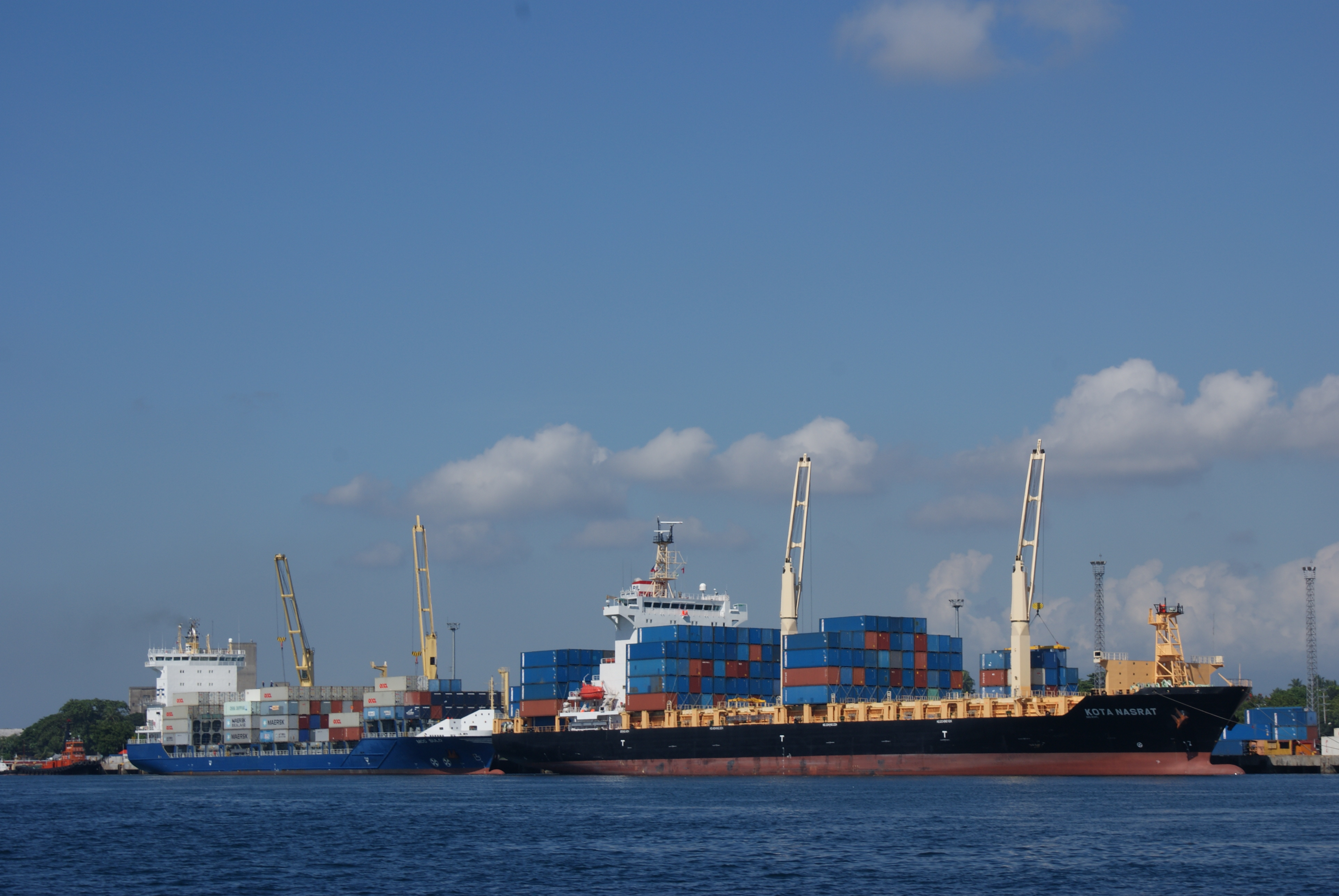
The International Seaport of Davao, the busiest port in Mindanao.

Three of the four main seaports in the region operate in Metro Davao, namely: Sasa International Seaport in Sasa and Santa Ana Pier in the Chinatown District, both in Davao City; and Panabo Seaport in Davao del Norte. The former two, both of which are located in Port of Davao in Davao City, can service both interisland and international shipments. Sasa International Container Port, also located in the Davao International Seaport, is one of the busiest in the entire Visayas-Mindanao region.

Land

Metro Davao is served by the Pan-Philippine Highway as well as provincial roads connecting nearby provinces outside of Davao Region. The cities of Davao and Tagum are the metropolitan area's major land transportation hubs. All cities and towns in the metropolitan area have overland transport terminals connecting the area to other parts of Mindanao and the Philippines via buses and passenger vans.

The Mindanao Railway will have its first segment on the Tagum–Davao–Digos line, and its construction is targeted to begin in 2023.

=== Energy ===
The cities of Davao and Panabo and the town of Carmen has their electricity needs served by Davao Light and Power Company, a distribution utilities subsidiary of Aboitiz Power which also operates the 300-megawatt Therma South Coal-Fired Power Plant located in Brgy. Binugao, Davao City. The cities of Samal and Tagum and the town of Maco are served by Northern Davao Electric Cooperative (NORDECO), the city of Digos and the towns of Hagonoy, Malalag, Padada, Sulop, Sta. Cruz, and Sta. Maria and Malita by Davao del Sur Electric Cooperative (DASURECO).

=== Sanitation ===
Metro Davao currently does not have a unified sewage and sewerage system as to the fact that it is rather disconnected in terms of urban contiguity. As such, every city and town in the metropole has their own drainage system.

Davao City has its own water service via Davao City Water District. Other towns and cities within Metro Davao are served by their own water utility service providers.

The sanitary landfill at Barangay Carmen, Davao City are shared by both Davao and Panabo. The city of Tagum and the town of Carmen also had their own landfill located at Brgy. Nueva Fuerza, Tagum City.

== Education ==
Metro Davao has a number of educational institutions catering to the needs of its residents. These colleges and universities are mostly found in Davao City. There are also a number of international schools that serve the metro. Here are some notable institutions in Metro Davao.

Public

- Davao del Norte State College (1995)
- Southern Philippines Agri-Business and Marine and Aquatic School of Technology (1982)
- University of Southeastern Philippines (1978)
- University of the Philippines Mindanao (1995)

Private

- Academia de Davao College (2007)
- Ateneo de Davao University (1948)
- Brokenshire College (1954)
- Cor Jesu College (1959)
- Davao Doctors College (1975)
- Davao Medical School Foundation (1976)
- Holy Child College of Davao (1981)
- Holy Cross of Davao College (1951)
- Joji Ilagan International Schools (1982)
- Mapúa Malayan Colleges Mindanao (2018)
- Mindanao Kokusai Daigaku (2002)
- Polytechnic College of Davao del Sur (1986)
- Philippine Women's College of Davao (1953)
- San Pedro College (1956)
- St. John Paul II College of Davao (2000)
- St. Mary's College of Tagum (1948)
- University of Mindanao (1946)
- University of the Immaculate Conception (1905)

== Media ==
Davao City, having over a million night-time population and an estimated 4 million day-time population is home to many media outlets and Large media networks, maintain their respective local stations and branches for viewership, commercial and news coverage purposes. Most of these stations broadcast local news and public affairs as well as entertainment and dramas to cater to the local viewers.

=== TV stations ===
- Bright TV Asia Channel 1 (Bright Media Asia Corporation Berhad)
- TV5 Davao Channel 2 (TV5 Network, Inc.)
- ALLTV-4 Davao (Advanced Media Broadcasting System)
- GMA TV-5 Davao (GMA Network, Inc.)
- SBN/ETC TV-7 Davao (Southern Broadcasting Network)
- RPN/RPTV TV-9 Davao (Radio Philippines Network)
- PTV-11 Davao (People's Television Network)
- IBC TV-13 Davao (Intercontinental Broadcasting Corporation)
- A2Z Channel 21 Davao (ABS-CBN Corporation/ZOE Broadcasting Network)
- Light TV Davao Channel 20.2 (ZOE Broadcasting Network)
- RJTV Channel 23 (Rajah Broadcasting Network)
- Hope Channel 25 Davao (Hope Channel Philippines)
- GTV Channel 27 Davao (GMA Network, Inc.)
- One Sports Channel 29 (Nation Broadcasting Corporation/TV5 Network, Inc)
- BEAM TV-31 Davao (Broadcast Enterprises and Affiliated Media)
- RHTV 33 Davao (Manila Broadcasting Company)
- Net25 Channel 39 Davao (Eagle Broadcasting Corporation)
- GNN TV-41 Davao (Global Satellite Technology Services)
- SMNI TV-43 Davao (Sonshine Media Network International)
- DCBN Channel 45 (Davao Christian Bible Channel)
- UNTV Channel 51 Davao (Progressive Broadcasting Corporation)
- ANBC IMBN TV52 Davao Channel 52 (ANBC IMBN TV and Radio Network Corporation)
- DepEd TV Davao Channel 52.7

=== Cable and satellite TV operators ===
- Sky Cable Davao – Davao City
- Davao Cableworld Network – Davao City
- Eastcoast Cable TV Network – Davao City
- Digos Cable TV Network – Digos
- Prime Cable Network – Digos and Samal
- Wise Cable TV Network – Tagum and Maco
- Love Net TV – Tagum
- Panabo Satellite Cable TV – Panabo, Carmen and Samal
- Asymmetrical Cable TV Network – Carmen and Padada
- G Sat Cable
- Sky Direct
- Cignal TV

There is one regional newscast in Metro Davao like One Mindanao that aired on GMA 5 Davao, simulcast on all GMA stations in Mindanao including semi-satellite stations in Cagayan de Oro and General Santos.

Aside from the 24 national daily newspapers available, Davao City also has 21 local newspapers. Among the widely read are SunStar Davao, the Mindanao Times and the Mindanao Examiner.
