= DXRS =

DXRS may refer to:

- DXRS-AM, an AM radio station broadcasting in Surigao City, branded as RMN Surigao
- DXRS-FM, an FM radio station broadcasting in Gingoog, branded as Radyo Natin
- DXRS-TV, a TV station broadcastiong in Davao City, branded as RJTV
