= Braulio E. Dujali =

Municipality in Davao del Norte, Philippines

- Municipality
- Municipality of Braulio E. Dujali
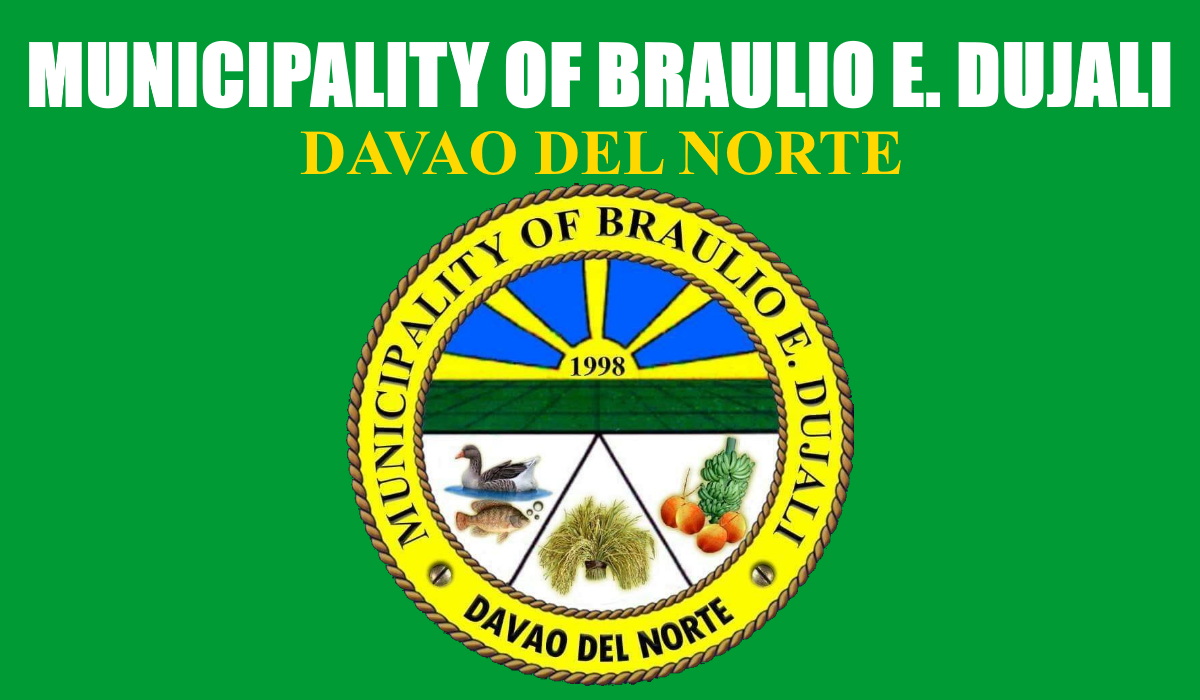
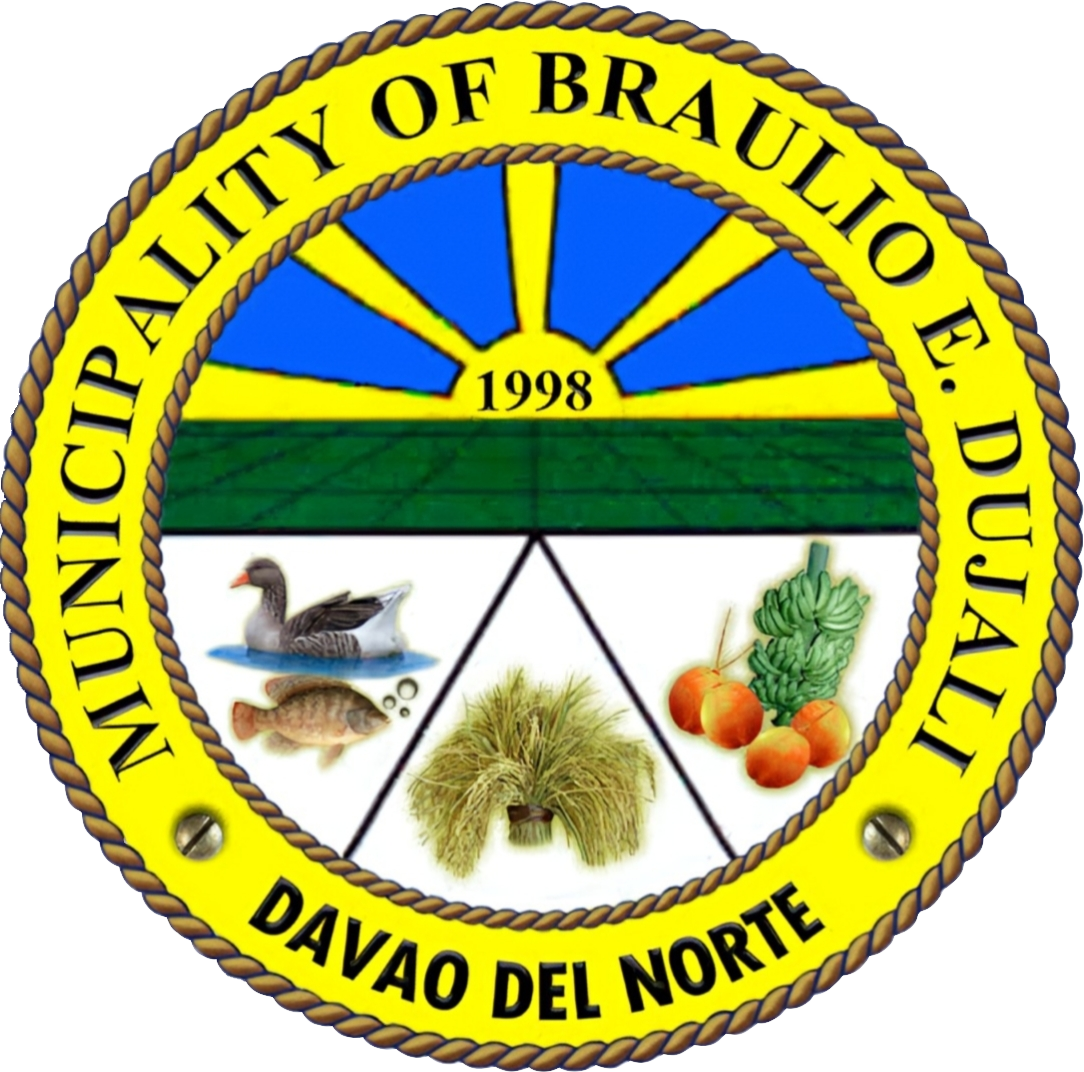
- Flag Seal

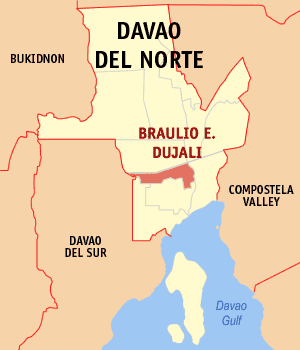
- Map of Davao del Norte with Braulio E. Dujali highlighted
- Interactive map of Braulio E. Dujali
- Location within the Philippines
- Coordinates: 7°27′04″N 125°41′19″E
- Country: Philippines
- Region: Davao Region
- Province: Davao del Norte
- District: 2nd district
- Founded: 30 January 1998; 28 years ago
- Named for: Braulio Española Dujali
- Barangays: 5 (see Barangays)

Government
  - Type: Sangguniang Bayan
  - Mayor: Leah Marie M. Romano
  - Vice Mayor: Restie E. Tabirao
  - Representative: JM Lagdameo (PFP)
  - Municipal Council: Members: Yasmin V. Campion; Melfar C. Aguiluz; Ricky T. Delco; Samuel F. Pacres; Concordio B. Momo Jr.; Adhem F. Funa; Nelson C. Baer; Miko G. Dujali
  - Electorate: 22,834 voters (2025)

Area
  - Total: 91.00 km^{2} (35.14 sq mi)
- Elevation: 16 m (52 ft)
- Highest elevation: 97 m (318 ft)
- Lowest elevation: 0 m (0 ft)

Population (2024 census)
  - Total: 36,092
  - Density: 396.6/km^{2} (1,027/sq mi)
  - Households: 7,178

Economy
  - Income class: 3rd municipal income class
  - Poverty incidence: 15.61% (2023)
  - Revenue: ₱ 182.4 million (2024)
  - Assets: ₱ 573.6 million (2024)
  - Expenditure: ₱ 153.9 million (2024)
  - Liabilities: ₱ 175 million (2024)

Service provider
  - Electricity: Davao Light and Power Company (DLPC)
- Time zone: UTC+8 (PST)
- ZIP code: 8100
- PSGC: 1102323000
- IDD : area code: +63 (0)84
- Native languages: Davawenyo; Cebuano; Ata Manobo; Kalagan; Tagalog
- Website: www.braulioedujali.gov.ph

Braulio E. Dujali (IPA: [bɾɐ'uʎɔ i du'hali]), officially the Municipality of Braulio E. Dujali (Cebuano: Lungsod sa Braulio E. Dujali; Tagalog: Bayan ng Braulio E. Dujali), or simply referred to as Dujali, is a municipality in the province of Davao del Norte, Philippines. According to the 2024 census, it has a population of 36,092 people.

== History ==
The municipality was established on January 30, 1998, by virtue of Republic Act No. 8473, carved from parts of Panabo and Carmen, and named after Braulio Española Dujali, leader of the first group of Karay-a settlers that came from South Cotabato (originally from Antique).

== Geography ==
Braulio E. Dujali is located in Mindanao, and it is in the province's second political district. It is bounded in the north by the Municipality of Santo Tomas, Davao del Norte to the west, Carmen and Panabo to the south and Tagum to the east.

=== Climate ===
Climate data for Braulio E. Dujali, Davao del Norte
Month	Jan	Feb	Mar	Apr	May	Jun	Jul	Aug	Sep	Oct	Nov	Dec	Year
Mean daily maximum °C (°F)	29 (84)	30 (86)	30 (86)	30 (86)	31 (88)	31 (88)	30 (86)	30 (86)	30 (86)	30 (86)	30 (86)	30 (86)	30 (86)
Mean daily minimum °C (°F)	22 (72)	22 (72)	22 (72)	22 (72)	23 (73)	24 (75)	24 (75)	24 (75)	24 (75)	24 (75)	23 (73)	22 (72)	23 (73)
Average precipitation mm (inches)	98 (3.9)	86 (3.4)	91 (3.6)	83 (3.3)	133 (5.2)	158 (6.2)	111 (4.4)	101 (4.0)	94 (3.7)	117 (4.6)	131 (5.2)	94 (3.7)	1,297 (51.2)
Average rainy days	16.4	14.3	16.3	18.5	25.3	25.0	23.8	21.9	20.8	24.4	24.3	18.7	249.7
Source: Meteoblue

=== Barangays ===
Braulio E. Dujali is politically subdivided into 5 barangays. Each barangay consists of puroks while some have sitios.

- Cabayangan
- Dujali
- Magupising
- New Casay
- Tanglaw

== Demographics ==
Population census of Braulio E. Dujali
Year	Pop.	±% p.a.
2000	18,050	—
2007	24,886	+4.53%
2010	28,339	+4.84%
2015	30,104	+1.16%
2020	35,729	+3.67%
2024	36,092	+0.24%
Source: Philippine Statistics Authority

== Economy ==
Poverty incidence of Braulio E. Dujali (%)

Source: Philippine Statistics Authority

Significant to economic development of Braulio E. Dujali are TADECO company and local businessman engaged in banana based commercial production successfully operating in the municipality. Rice production also contributes to the economic development of the municipality.

== Education ==
Braulio E. Dujali has several public and private schools.

=== Public elementary schools ===
- Balisong Elementary School
- Cabay-angan Elementary School
- DAPECOL Elementary School
- Dujali Central Elementary School
- East Cabay-angan Elementary School
- Magupising Elementary School
- New Casay Elementary School
- Sitio Bacali Elementary School
- Sitio Talisay Elementary School
- Tanglaw 3A Annex Elementary School
- Tanglaw Elementary School

=== Public high schools ===
- Antonio Fruto National High School
- Dujali National High School
- Tanglaw National High School

=== Private schools ===
- ABA Technical Institute (tertiary school)
- Zion Christian School of Tanglaw Inc. (kinder, elementary and high school)
