= Visayan Electric Company =

Electric utility company in the Philippines

Visayan Electric Company, Inc.
- Type: Public
- Industry: Power distributor
- Founded: 1905
- Founder: Messrs. M. Levering, A. Bryan, R. Landon and A. Pond.
- Headquarters: Cebu City, Philippines
- Area served: Metro Cebu
- Key people: Mark Anthony Kindica (OIC-President and General Manager)
- Parent: Aboitiz Power Corporation and Vivant Corporation
- Website: www.visayanelectric.com

Visayan Electric Company, Inc., also known as Visayan Electric (formerly VECO), is the second largest electric utility in the Philippines and serves the cities of Cebu, Mandaue, Talisay and Naga and four municipalities of the greater part of Metro Cebu - Liloan, Consolacion, Minglanilla and San Fernando. Its franchise service covers an area of about 672 square kilometers with an estimated population of 1.73 million.

== History ==
VECO's previous logo

VECO was founded in 1905 by a group of Cebu businessmen led by Messrs. M. Levering, A. Bryan, R. Landon and Arlington Pond. It started with an 800 kW generating facility by the Cebu pier. By 1918, Viuda é hijos de Francisco Escaño, Inc. had acquired control and began expanding both the generation capacity and the distribution network.

In 1919, under the Escaño family, VECO was reorganised and purchased two 250hp gas engines to replace the company's single 300hp steam engine. The development allowed for greater generation capacity and was publicly promoted increasing the company's clientele. The rapid increase in need and accessibility of electricity in the early 20th Century resulted in the two engines being overpowered by 1925. That same year, a Swedish Polar Atlas (now Atlas Copco) 500hp diesel engine was added to accommodate the increasing usage. By 1929, a fourth engine, a newer model of the existing Polar Atlas diesel engine was added, boasting 550hp.

In 1929, Gabriel A. Daza, Supervising Engineer and Assistant General Manager of the Company, sought to expand VECO's business outside of the City of Cebu. Daza went to Philippine Legislature in Manila to work on a new franchise. The Legislature approved the franchise in 1931, and VECO was given a 50 year authorisation to operate North and South of Cebu over 60km including: Mandaue, Consolacion, Liloan and Compostela, North of Cebu; and Talisay (which they have outages for almost 4x a month), Minglanilla, Naga, San Fernando and Danao. Daza's expansion of VECO resulted in the installation of a fifth engine, a Swiss Sulzer-Unternehmungen AG Winterthur Internal Combustion engine, boasting 1,500hp. In 1933, VECO produced 3,815,270KWH.

In 1938, VECO had 10,000~ customers and owned subsidiary plants in: Bogo, Cebu; Dumaguete, Negros Oriental; and Dipolog, Zamboanga.

During the Second World War, the United States Armed Forces in the Far East (USAFFE) bombed all the generation units in order to deprive the occupying Japanese forces control of the network. In December 1945, with the war over, VECO was back in business delivering power to its customers.

== Legislative order ==
VECO was granted its legislative franchise under Act No. 3499 which was approved by the Philippine Legislature in 1928. It authorized VECO to install, operate and maintain electric light, heat and power system in the Municipalities of Cebu (now City), Talisay (now City), Minglanilla, Naga (now City), San Fernando, Mandaue (now City), Consolacion, Liloan and Compostela. The period of existence of the franchise was for 50 years. This was subsequently extended for another 25 years by RA 6454 which took effect in 1972. In 2005, RA 9339 was signed extending the term of VECO's franchise for another 25 years. At present, VECO's franchise area covers the cities of Cebu, Mandaue, Talisay and Naga plus the municipalities of Consolacion, Liloan, Minglanilla and San Fernando.

VECO uses a SCADA (Supervisory Control and Data Acquisition) system to monitor and control its electric distribution assets via remote control. It also has a GIS (Geographic Information System) to map and manage its facilities.

In early 2005, VECO opened a full service centre at SM City Cebu with its own Contact Centre equipped with a VoIP telephone system integrated with CRMS. A second, albeit smaller, full service centre also opened in Talisay City in 2007 to attend to the needs of customers in the southern part of the franchise area. VECO is now owned and managed by publicly listed Aboitiz Power Corporation (PSE: AP) and Vivant Corporation. Approximately 800 individual shareholders comprise the VECO shareholders' roster.
