= Davao Light and Power Company =

Philippine electric company

Davao Light and Power Company, Inc.
- Type: Subsidiary
- Industry: Electricity
- Founded: 1929 in Davao, Philippine Islands, United States
- Founder: Patrick Henry Frank
- Headquarters: Davao City, Philippines
- Number of locations: 12
- Area served: Davao City; Davao del Norte
- Key people: Engr. Enriczar T. Tia, COO
- Parent: Aboitiz Power Corporation

Davao Light and Power Company, Inc. (DLPC) is a Davao-based Filipino electricity company and the third largest privately owned electric utility in the Philippines and is owned by Aboitiz Power Corporation (AboitizPower). In 2007, the company had 247,341 customers and 290,000 customers in 2012. It serves Davao City and several southern parts of the Province of Davao Del Norte namely: Panabo City, Carmen, Braulio E. Dujali, Sto. Tomas, and southern portions of Asuncion and Kapalong, later expanded into the entire province of Davao del Norte.

The company was founded in 1929 and originally owned by P. H. Frank but was sold to the Aboitiz Group in 1941.

A house bill seeking to expand its franchise area was vetoed by Pres. Bongbong Marcos on July 27, 2022. However, another similar bill lapsed into law on April 6, 2025, effectively expanding its franchise area.

== Service area ==
=== Current areas of Davao Light ===
==== Areas currently in service pre-2026 expansion ====
- Braulio E. Dujali – added in 1998 after its creation as a municipality.
- Carmen – added 1970s.
- Davao City – Original and core service area.
- Panabo – added 1970s.
- Santo Tomás – added 1970s.

==== Additional areas post-2026 ====
- Asunción
- Kapalong – Initially covered some areas such as Luna, Pag-asa and Sampao since 1970s, later Maniki since January 2026, now covered the entire municipality since May 26, 2026.
- New Corella
- Samal – Recently started its operations as of February 26, 2026 covering first 26 areas around the island city, in addition to 20 remaining areas as of June 3, 2026.
- Sawata
- Tagum – Recently started its operations as of May 26, 2026, superseding Northern Davao Electric Cooperative (NORDECO) as a service provider.
- Talaingod

=== Partial and limited coverage areas ===
- Arakan – Particularly Dallag, Datu Ladayon, Gambodes and Katipunan, which co-exists with Cotabato Electric Cooperative (COTELCO). This is due to proximity along Bukidnon–Davao Road.
- Kitaotao – Particularly some areas bordering Davao City along Bukidnon–Davao Road.
- Santa Cruz – Particularly Inawayan and Sibulan, which co-exists with Davao del Sur Electric Cooperative (DASURECO) and also due to close proximity with Therma South power plant owned by Davao Light's parent company AboitizPower.

=== Upcoming service areas ===
- Laak
