= Santo Tomas, Davao del Norte =

Municipality in Davao del Norte, Philippines

Santo Tomas
- Municipality
- Municipality of Santo Tomas
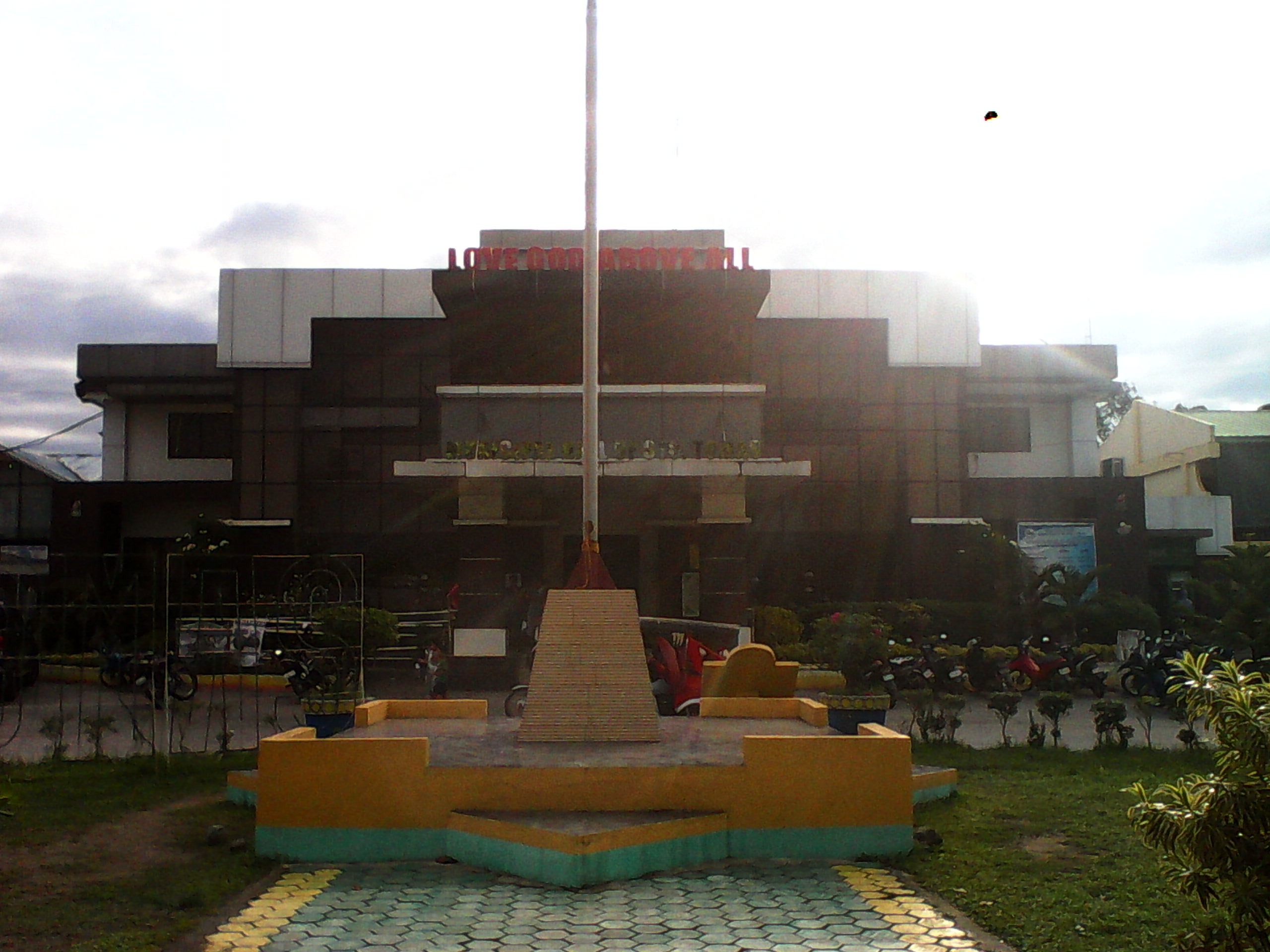
- Municipal Hall

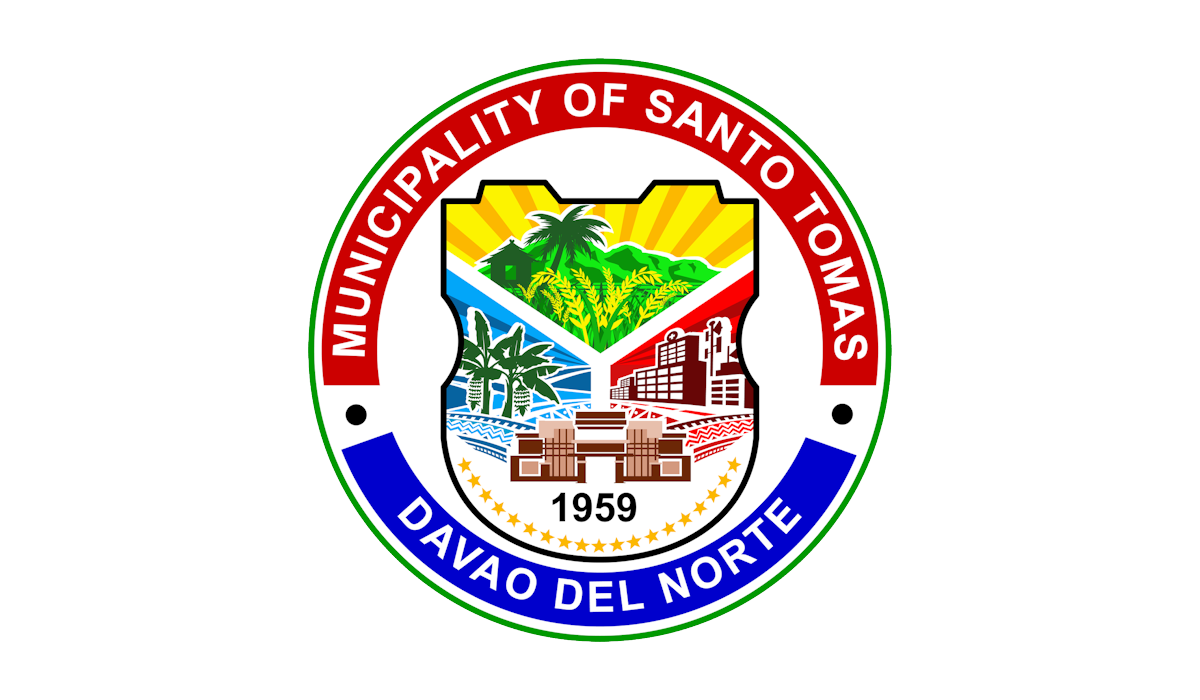
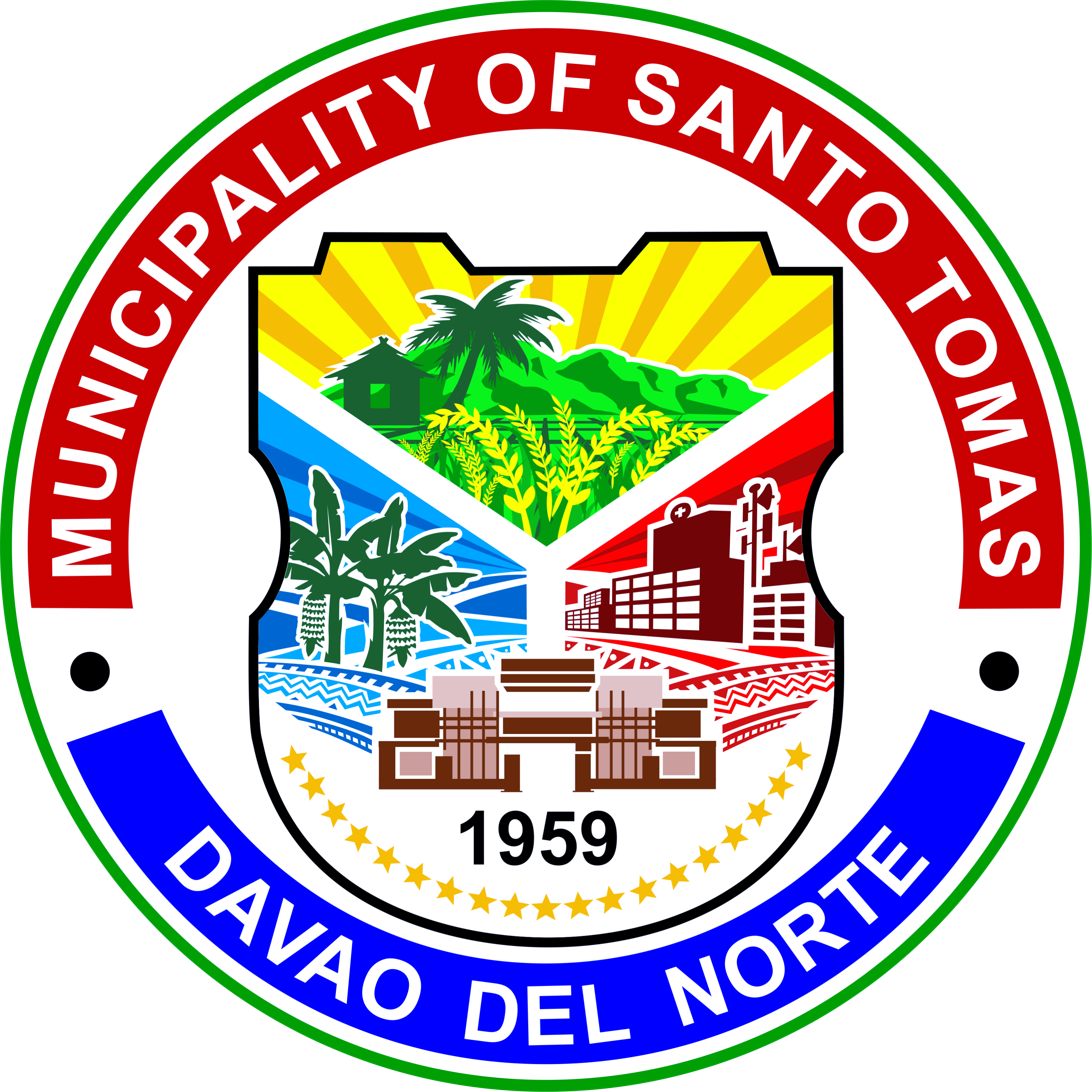
- Flag Seal

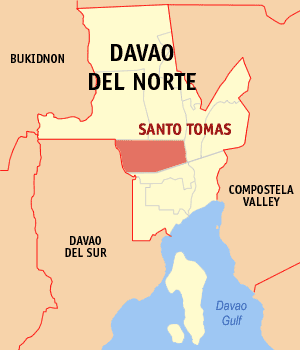
- Map of Davao del Norte with Santo Tomas highlighted
- Interactive map of Santo Tomas
- Location within the Philippines
- Coordinates: 7°32′02″N 125°37′25″E
- Country: Philippines
- Region: Davao Region
- Province: Davao del Norte
- District: 2nd district
- Founded: August 14, 1959
- Named for: St. Thomas of Villanova
- Barangays: 19 (see Barangays)

Government
  - Type: Sangguniang Bayan
  - Mayor: Roland "Angkol" S. Dejesica
  - Vice Mayor: Maria Luz "Inday ng Masa" F. Dejesica
  - Representative: JM Lagdameo (PFP)
  - Municipal Council: Members: Deofel S. Rollan; Daniel S. Batosalem, Jr., MDMG; Ronald P. Dimaya; Joshua Bebis; Julie H. Mantequilla; Henly P. Danila; Benigno R. Andamon; Gabriel Eric L. Estela, DMD
  - Electorate: 74,990 voters (2025)

Area
  - Total: 221.8 km^{2} (85.6 sq mi)
- Elevation: 37 m (121 ft)
- Highest elevation: 197 m (646 ft)
- Lowest elevation: 16 m (52 ft)

Population (2024 census)
  - Total: 131,100
  - Density: 591.1/km^{2} (1,531/sq mi)
  - Households: 30,750
- Demonym(s): Tomasito; Tomasita

Economy
  - Income class: 1st municipal income class
  - Poverty incidence: 15.99% (2023)
  - Revenue: ₱ 659.5 million (2024)
  - Assets: ₱ 1,695 million (2024)
  - Expenditure: ₱ 621.6 million (2024)
  - Liabilities: ₱ 419.7 million (2024)

Service provider
  - Electricity: Davao Light and Power Company (DLPC)
- Time zone: UTC+8 (PST)
- ZIP code: 8112
- PSGC: 1102318000
- IDD : area code: +63 (0)84
- Native languages: Davawenyo; Cebuano; Ata Manobo; Kalagan; Tagalog
- Website: www.stotomas.gov.ph

Santo Tomas, officially the Municipality of Santo Tomas (Cebuano: Lungsod sa Santo Tomas; Tagalog: Bayan ng Santo Tomas; Spanish: Municipio de Santo Tomás), is a municipality in the province of Davao del Norte, Philippines. According to the 2024 census, it has a population of 131,100 people.

== Etymology ==
Santo Tomas was so named after Saint Thomas, the patron saint of Danao which is the hometown of then Governor of undivided Davao Province Vicente Duterte, father of the 16th Philippine president Rodrigo Duterte.

== History ==
What is now Santo Tomas, initially called Tibal-og, was once part of the jurisdiction of nearby town of Kapalong. Before the 1950s. the place used to be a lush forest inhabited by the indigenous Ata-Manobo people.

According to the town's pioneering residents, the area of what is now Kapalong (in which what is now Santo Tomas was still part of) and Panabo City were planted for abaca during the pre-war years.

Santo Tomas was established as a municipality through Executive Order No. 352, issued by President Carlos P. Garcia on August 14, 1959. It consists of Barrio Tibal-og, designated as the seat of government, and "other barrios or sitios" of Kapalong, and four barrios of Panabo, all then part of the old Davao province.

Feliciano P. Ganade served as the first elected mayor of Santo Tomas after briefly governing the town of Kapalong.

From then on, it continued to grow and prosper, even as it went several successions of mayoralty governance throughout its history.

== Geography ==
Santo Tomas is located on the island of Mindanao, and it is in the province's second political district. It is bounded in the north by the Municipalities of Kapalong and Talaingod, in the east by the Municipality of Asuncion, in the west by Davao City, and in the south by the Municipality of Braulio E. Dujali.

=== Climate ===
Rainfall in Santo Tomas is evenly distributed throughout the year. Being a nearly typhoon-free municipality, the production of high-value crops is favorable all year round and makes a profitable investment.

Climate data for Santo Tomas, Davao del Norte
Month	Jan	Feb	Mar	Apr	May	Jun	Jul	Aug	Sep	Oct	Nov	Dec	Year
Mean daily maximum °C (°F)	28 (82)	28 (82)	29 (84)	31 (88)	31 (88)	30 (86)	30 (86)	31 (88)	31 (88)	31 (88)	30 (86)	29 (84)	30 (86)
Mean daily minimum °C (°F)	22 (72)	22 (72)	22 (72)	22 (72)	23 (73)	24 (75)	23 (73)	23 (73)	23 (73)	23 (73)	23 (73)	23 (73)	23 (73)
Average precipitation mm (inches)	63 (2.5)	50 (2.0)	35 (1.4)	22 (0.9)	47 (1.9)	68 (2.7)	51 (2.0)	53 (2.1)	49 (1.9)	47 (1.9)	39 (1.5)	38 (1.5)	562 (22.3)
Average rainy days	15.0	12.6	10.4	8.2	18.8	22.5	21.2	20.5	20.3	20.3	14.4	11.7	195.9
Source: Meteoblue

=== Barangays ===
Santo Tomas is politically subdivided into 19 barangays.

- Balagunan
- Bobongon
- Casig-Ang
- Esperanza
- Kimamon
- Kinamayan
- La Libertad
- Lungaog
- Magwawa
- New Katipunan
- New Visayas
- Pantaron
- Salvacion
- San Jose
- San Miguel
- San Vicente
- Talomo
- Tibal-og
- Tulalian

== Demographics ==
Population census of Santo Tomas
Year	Pop.	±% p.a.
1960	16,687	—
1970	21,241	+2.44%
1975	31,584	+8.28%
1980	44,512	+7.10%
1990	67,916	+4.32%
1995	77,182	+2.43%
2000	84,367	+1.93%
2007	97,210	+1.97%
2010	109,269	+4.35%
2015	118,750	+1.60%
2020	128,667	+1.70%
2024	131,100	+0.45%
Source: Philippine Statistics Authority

Santo Tomas is home to a diverse culture inter-mingling with Mandaya and Ata-Manobo. The people are predominantly Cebuano.

Santo Tomas is also the most populated municipality in the Province of Davao del Norte.

== Economy ==
Poverty incidence of Santo Tomas (%)

Source: Philippine Statistics Authority

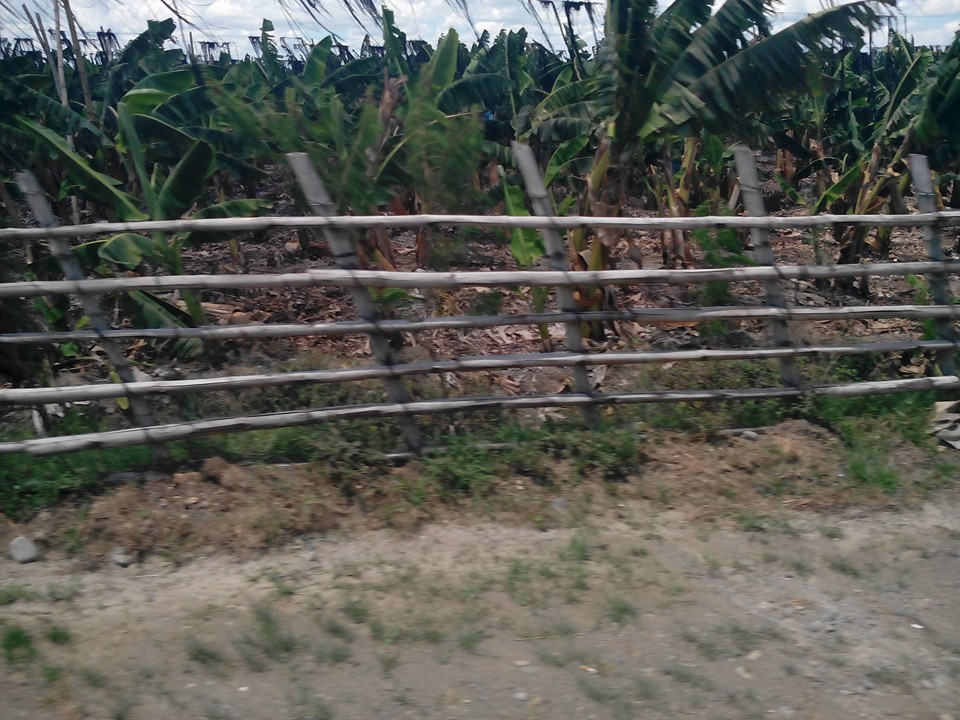
Banana plantation, located at the southern portion of Santo Tomas

Significant to the economic development of Santo Tomas is a number of multi-national corporations and cooperatives engaged in banana based commercial production successfully operating in the municipality. Rice production also contributes to the economic development of the municipality. In 2015, SantoTomas was part of the lists for the top 15 richest municipality in Davao Region which was listed as the second place.

== Transportation ==
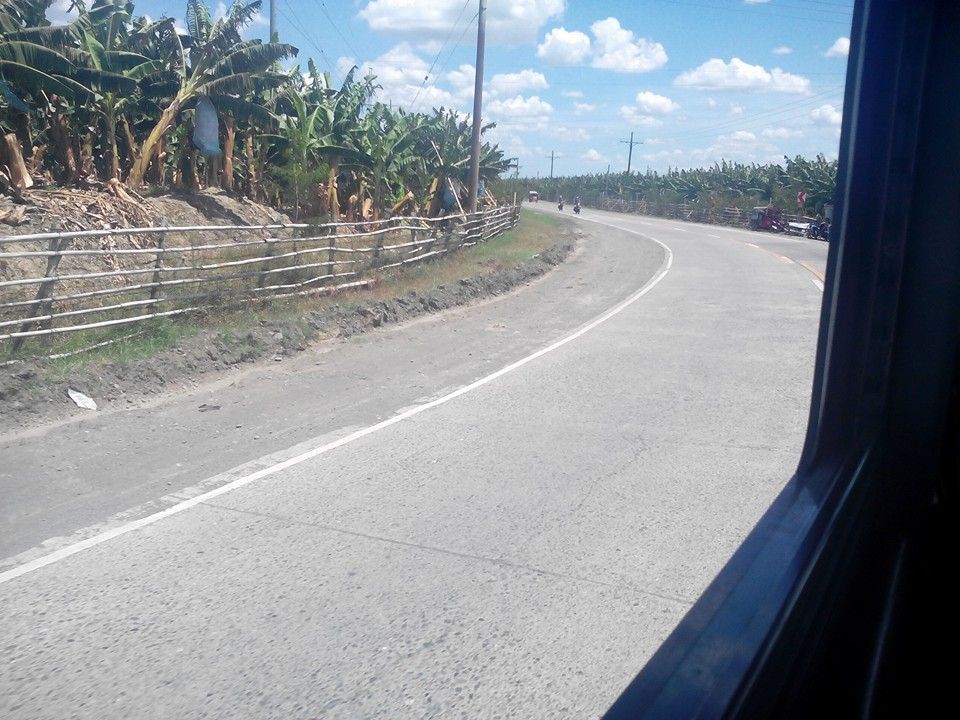
A shot of Davao del Norte Circumferential Road in Barangay Balagunan, Santo Tomas. The road cuts through the banana plantations of Davao Prison and Penal Farm.

Santo Tomas sits astride the Davao del Norte Provincial Circumferential Road. It is more or less 30 kilometres (19 mi) or about an hour ride from Tagum City by any land vehicle, and the town offers a wide choice of public utility jeepneys via Kinamayan route or bus liners via Carmen route. Davao City is approximately 63 kilometres (39 mi) or an hour and a half ride by bus or private car.

Santo Tomas is accessible by land through any type of vehicle. There are tricycle units serving the different routes within the municipality. Most tricycles are color-coded red, with a capacity of 6 passengers per tricycle.

== Education ==
Santo Tomas have several public and private institutions.

Elementary schools:

- Apitong Elementary School (Public)
- Balagunan Elementary School (Public)
- Balisong Elementary School (Public)
- Bobongon Elementary School (Public)
- Casig-ang Elementary School (Public)
- Davao Winchester Colleges Inc. (Private)
- Esperanza Elementary School (Public)
- Holy Infant School of Santo Tomas, Inc. (Private)
- Jireh School of Tomorrow (Private)
- Jesus Lumain Elementary School (Public)
- Kimamon Elementary School (Public)
- Kinamayan Integrated School (Public)
- La Libertad Elementary School (Public)
- Lunga-og Elementary School (Public)
- Magwawa Elementary School (Public)
- Marsman Elementary School (Public)
- Maryknoll High School of Santo Tomas (Private)
- Mustard Seed Christian School, Inc. (Private)
- Nafco Central Elementary School (Public)
- New Katipunan Elementary School (Public)
- New Visayas Elementary School (Public)
- Pantaron Elementary School (Public)
- Philippine Baptist Christian College of Mindanao, Inc. (Private)
- Salvacion Elementary School (Public)
- San Isidro Elementary School (Public)
- San Jose Elementary School (Public)
- San Vincenzo Learning Center (Private)
- Santo Tomas Central Elementary School - Sped Center (Public)
- Talomo Elementary School (Public)
- Talos Elementary School (Public)
- Temple Christian School, Inc. (Private)
- Tulalian Elementary School (Public)

High schools:

- Balagunan National High School (Public)
- Davao Winchester Colleges Inc. (Private)
- Kimamon National High School (Public)
- La Libertad National High School (Public)
- Marsman National High School (Public)
- Maryknoll High School of Santo Tomas (Private)
- Mustard Seed Christian School, Inc. (Private)
- Philippine Baptist Christian College of Mindanao, Inc. (Private)
- Salvacion National High School (Public)
- Santo Tomas National High School (Public)
- Temple Christian School Inc. (Private)
- Tulalian National High School (Public)

Tertiary education:

- Bukidnon State University (discontinued)
- Davao Winchester Colleges Inc. (Private)
- University of Southeastern Philippines
- Santo Tomas College of Agriculture Science and Technology (STCAST)

Technical/vocational schools:

- ABA Technical School of Santo Tomas, Inc.
- Davao Winchester Colleges Inc. (Private)

== Culture ==
Araw ng Santo Tomas (lit. Day of Santo Tomas) is a celebration held every 14 August annually. Events include drum and lyre competitions; parades, fireworks display, and many more.

== Gallery ==
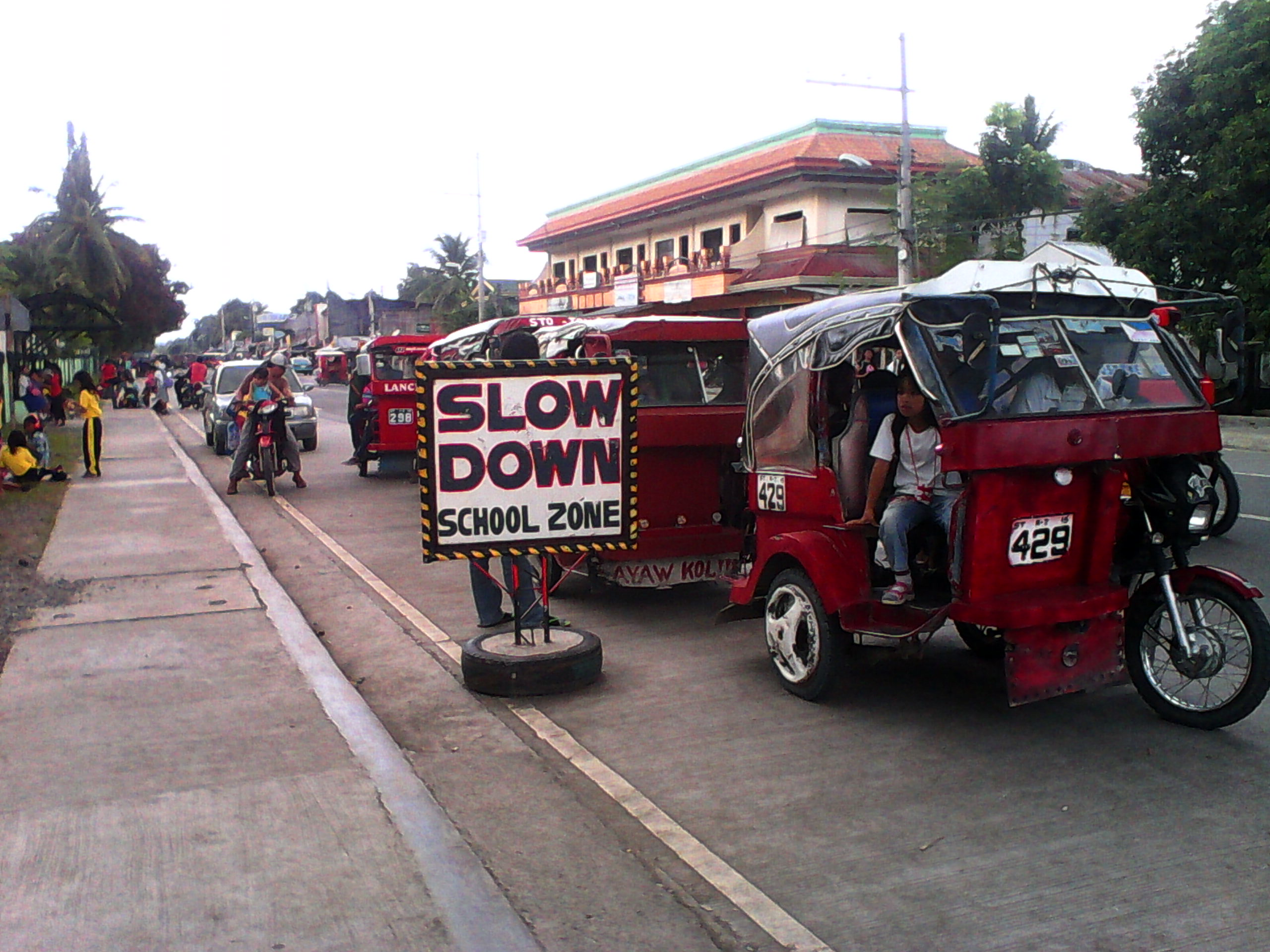
Row of parked tricycles outside the Santo Tomas Central Elem. School SPED Center campus.

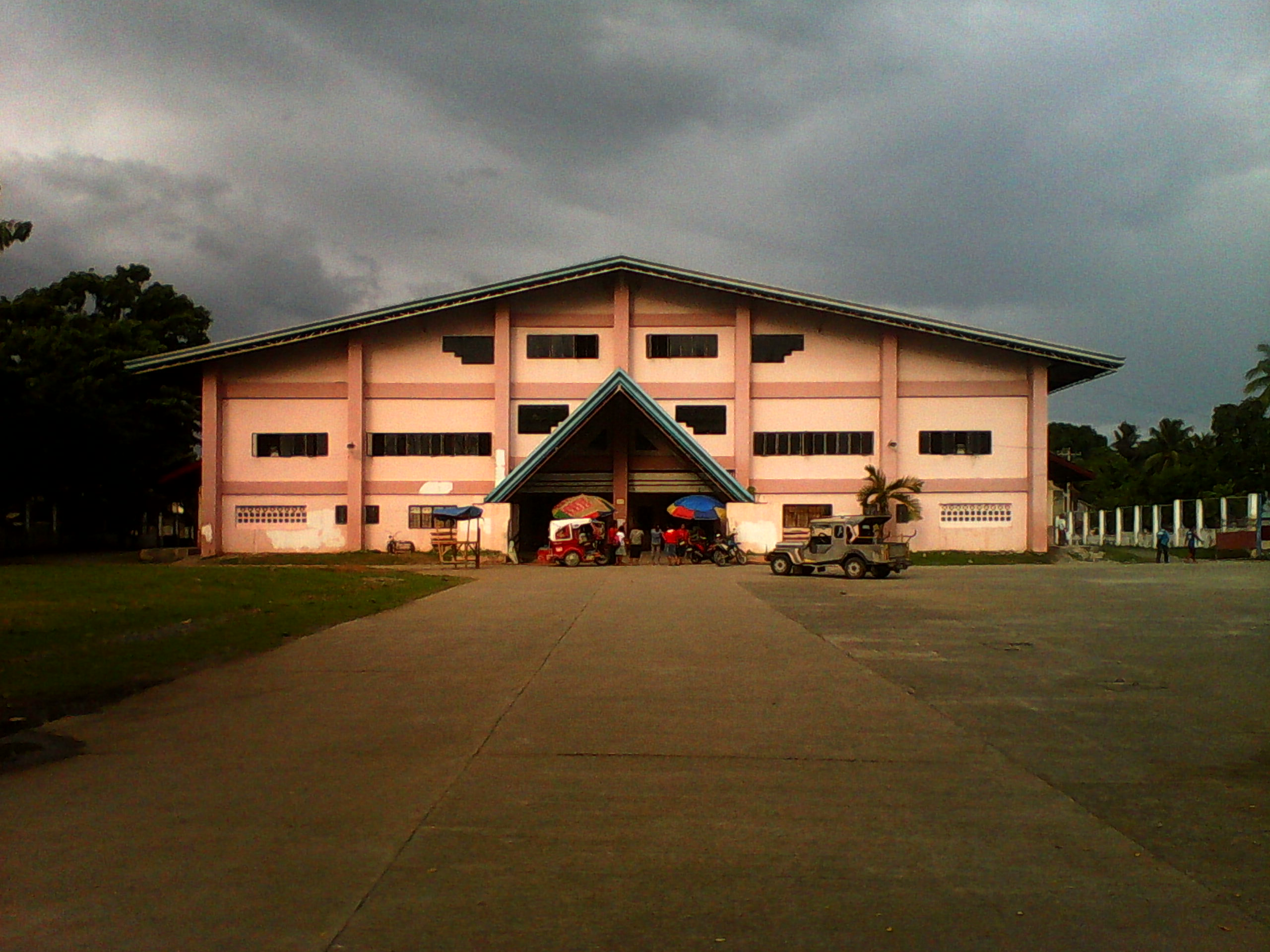
Santo Tomas Cultural Gymnasium

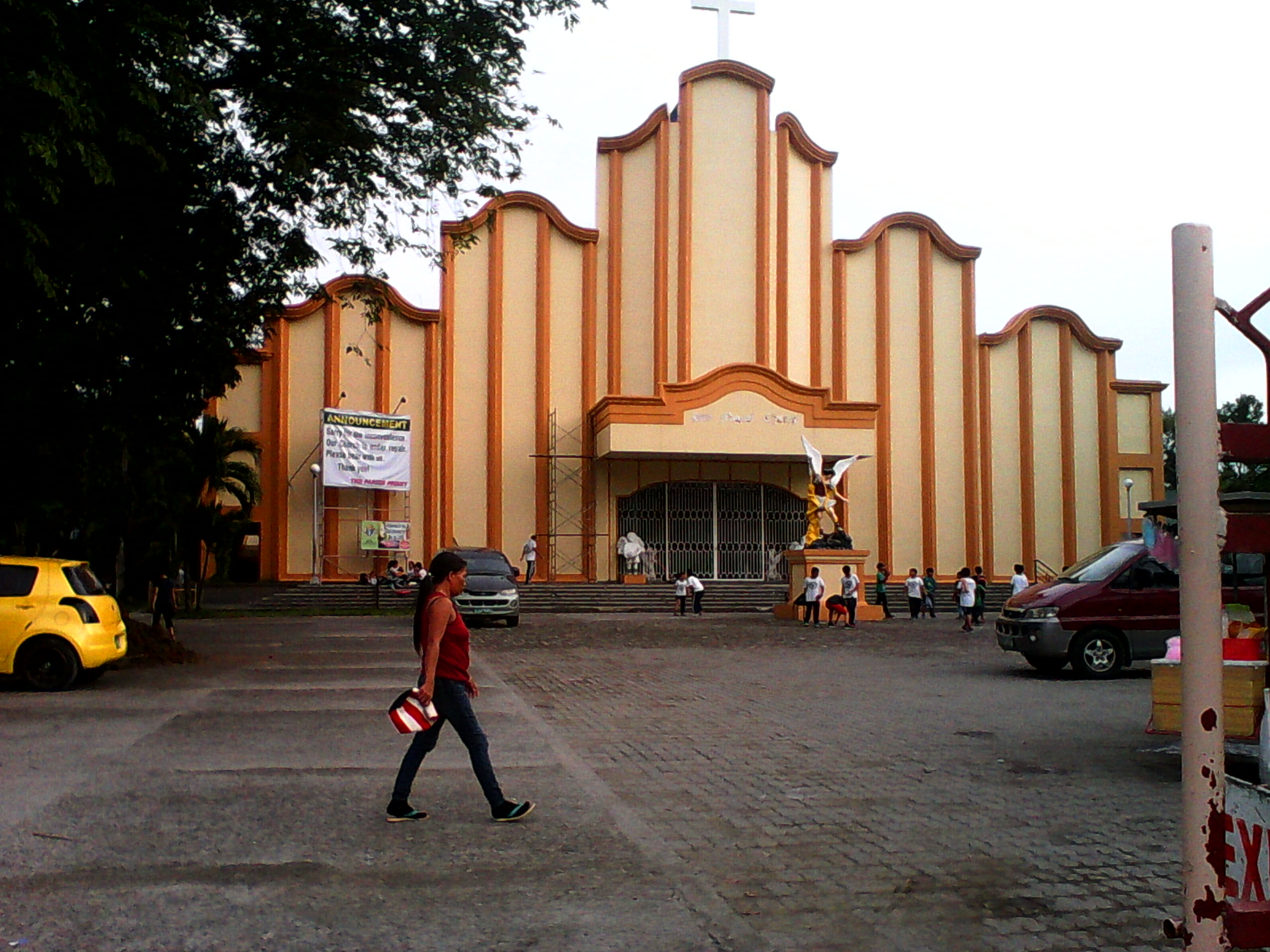
San Miguel Parish Church
