= AboitizPower =

Philippine energy holding company

- Ayala Triangle Gardens Tower 2, site of the headquarters of the Aboitiz Power
- Type: Public
- Traded as: PSE: AP
- Industry: Electric utilities, power generation
- Founded: Philippines; February 13, 1998; 28 years ago
- Headquarters: 11th-12th floor Ayala Triangle Gardens Tower 2, Paseo de Roxas corner Makati Ave, Makati Central Business District, Makati City, 1226 Metro Manila, Philippines
- Key people: Sabin M. Aboitiz (Chairman); Daniel C. Aboitiz (President & CEO)
- Revenue: ▼ ₱110.38 billion (2020)
- Net income: ▼ ₱14.82 billion (2020)
- Total assets: ▼ ₱397.93 billion (2020)
- Total equity: ▲ ₱127.16 billion (2020)
- Parent: Aboitiz Equity Ventures
- Subsidiaries: Davao Light and Power Company; Visayan Electric Company; Cotabato Light and Power Company; Hijos de F. Escaño, Inc. Pampanga Energy Ventures Inc. San Fernando Electric Light and Power Co. Subic Enerzone Corp.
- Website: https://aboitizpower.com/

Aboitiz Power Corporation also known as AboitizPower (AP), a subsidiary of Aboitiz Equity Ventures (AEV), is a holding company engaged in power distribution, generation and retail electricity services.

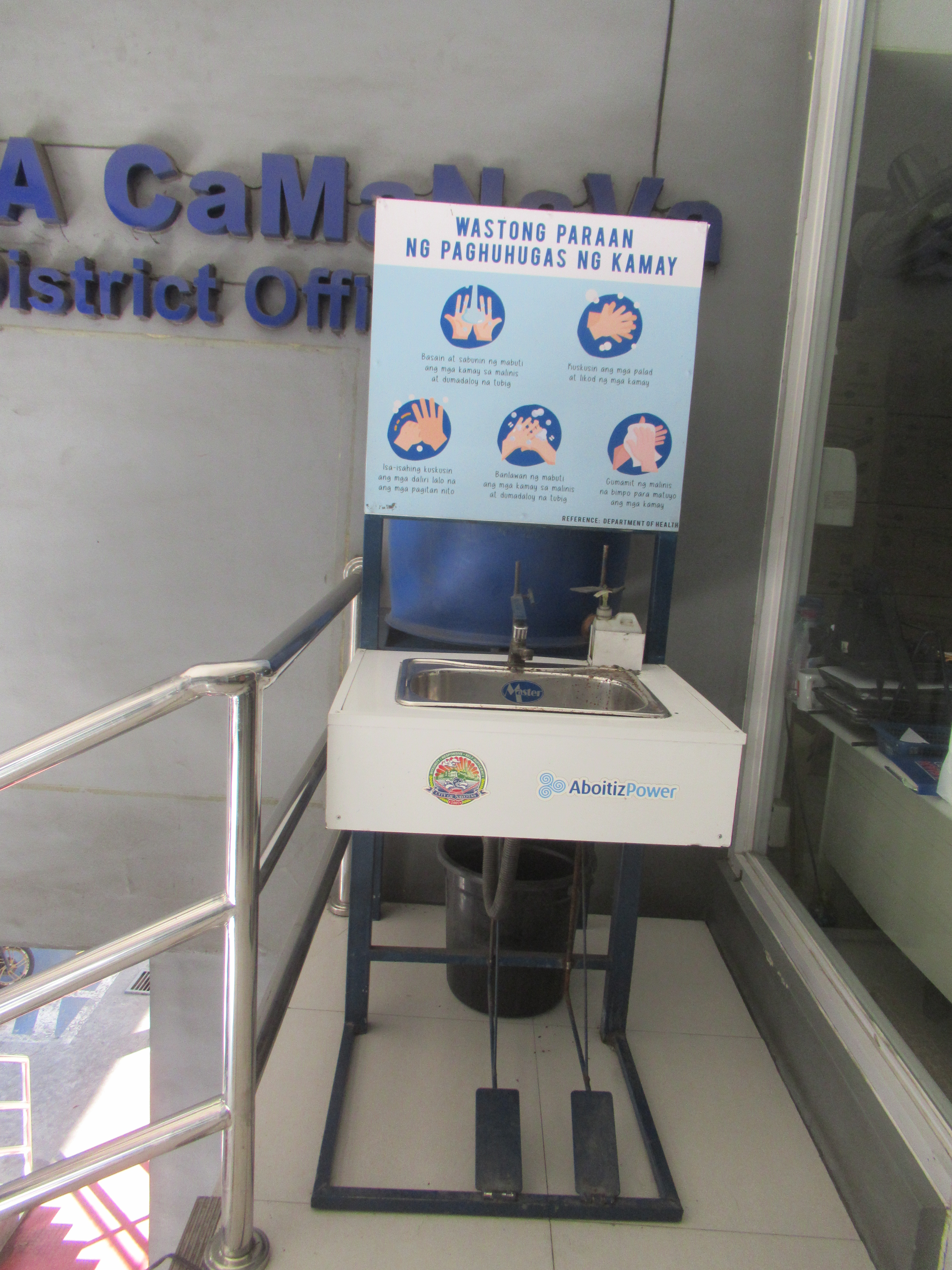
Navotas Vocational Training & Assessment Institute

== Background ==
Aboitiz Power Corporation was established on February 13, 1998. The company is AEV's largest subsidiary, contributing 71% of its total income in the first three months of 2019, and holds all of its assets in the generation and distribution of electricity. The company's power generation unit operates solar, coal, oil, hydroelectric, and geothermal facilities. As of 2025, coal comprises 48% of AEV's total net sellable capacity, with fossil fuels comprising at least 75% of its capacity.

On July 16, 2007, it became a publicly listed company on the Philippine Stock Exchange with an initial public offering of 1.8 billion shares out of 7.2 billion registered common shares.

In 2005, the company established SN Aboitiz Power (SNAP), a joint venture with Norway-based company SN Power Invest AS, to produce renewable energy. It implemented floating solar farms, which place solar panels on bodies of water to reduce land use, in Tawi-Tawi and at the Magat Dam in Isabela.

In April 2019, the Philippine Competition Commission (PCC), the Energy Regulatory Commission, and the Senate Committee on Energy conducted separate probes into a series of power outages in Luzon, which were alleged to have been caused by collusion among power firms to increase electricity prices. Power companies denied the allegations, and Aboitiz Power Corporation stated that the outages harmed business and that the company was open to any investigation. According to the Department of Energy, the outages were due to technical issues caused by old and new power plants, maintenance shutdowns, and reduced power ratings at some facilities.

== Subsidiaries ==
The company's subsidiaries include Aboitiz Energy Solutions Inc., Davao Light & Power Co. Inc., Cotabato Light & Power Co., Hijos de F. Escaño, Inc., Pampanga Energy Ventures Inc., San Fernando Electric Light and Power Co., Subic Enerzone Corp., and Visayan Electric Co., Inc.
