= Carmen, Davao del Norte =

Municipality in Davao del Norte, Philippines

Carmen
- Municipality
- Municipality of Carmen
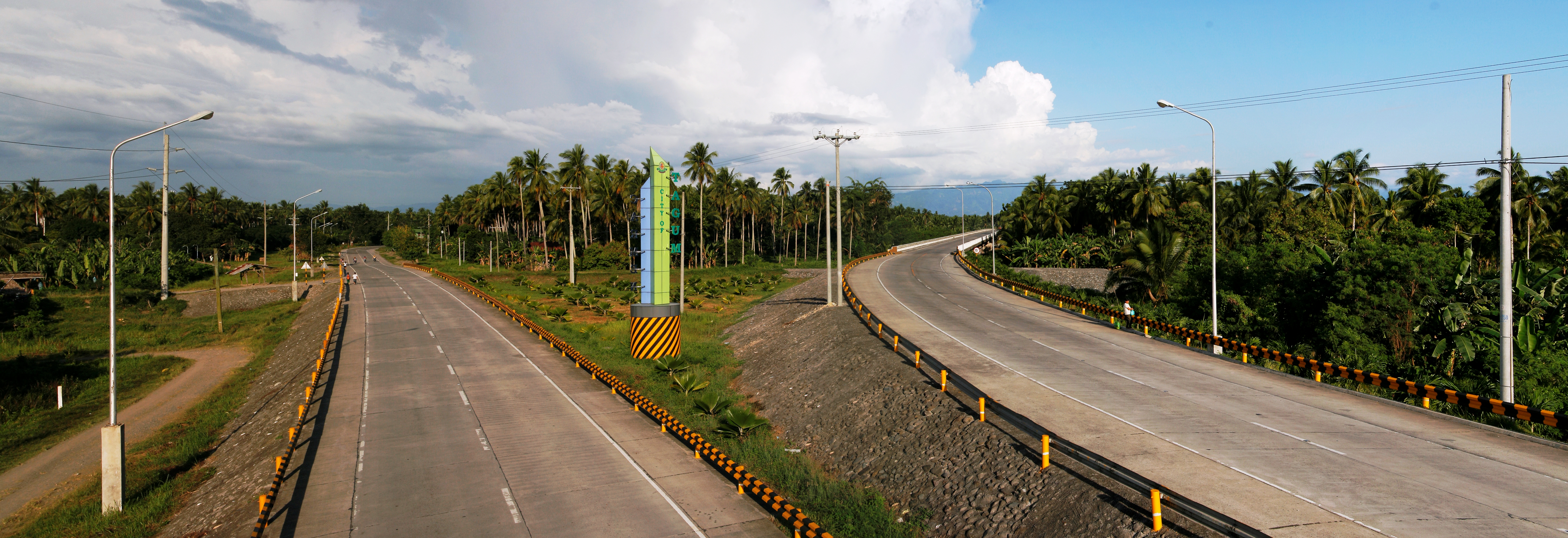
- Tagum-Carmen Border

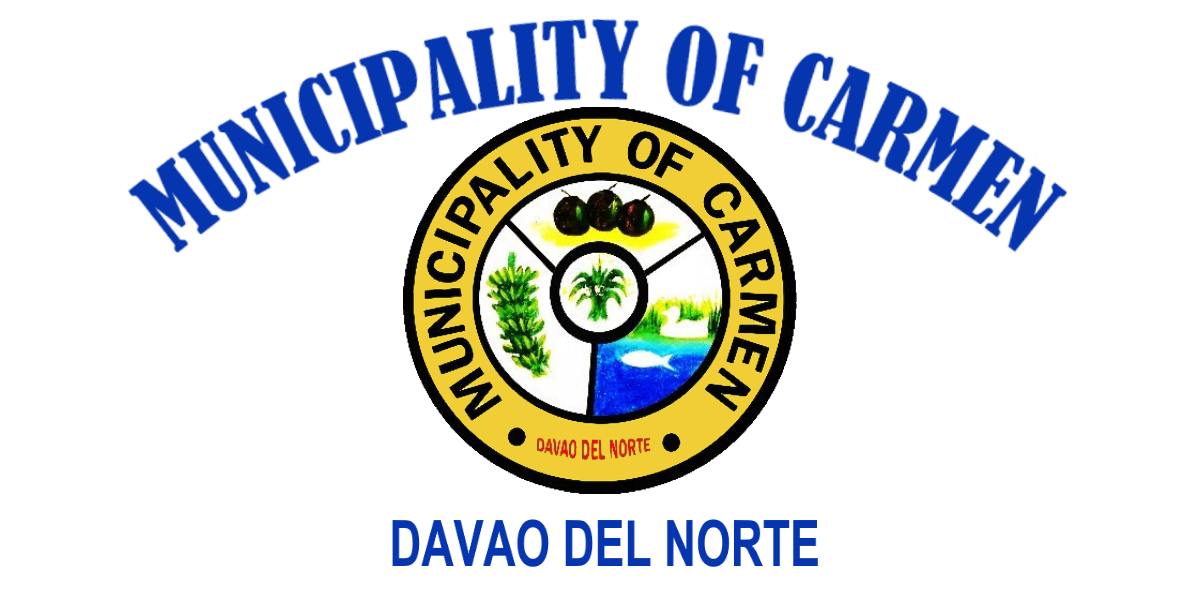
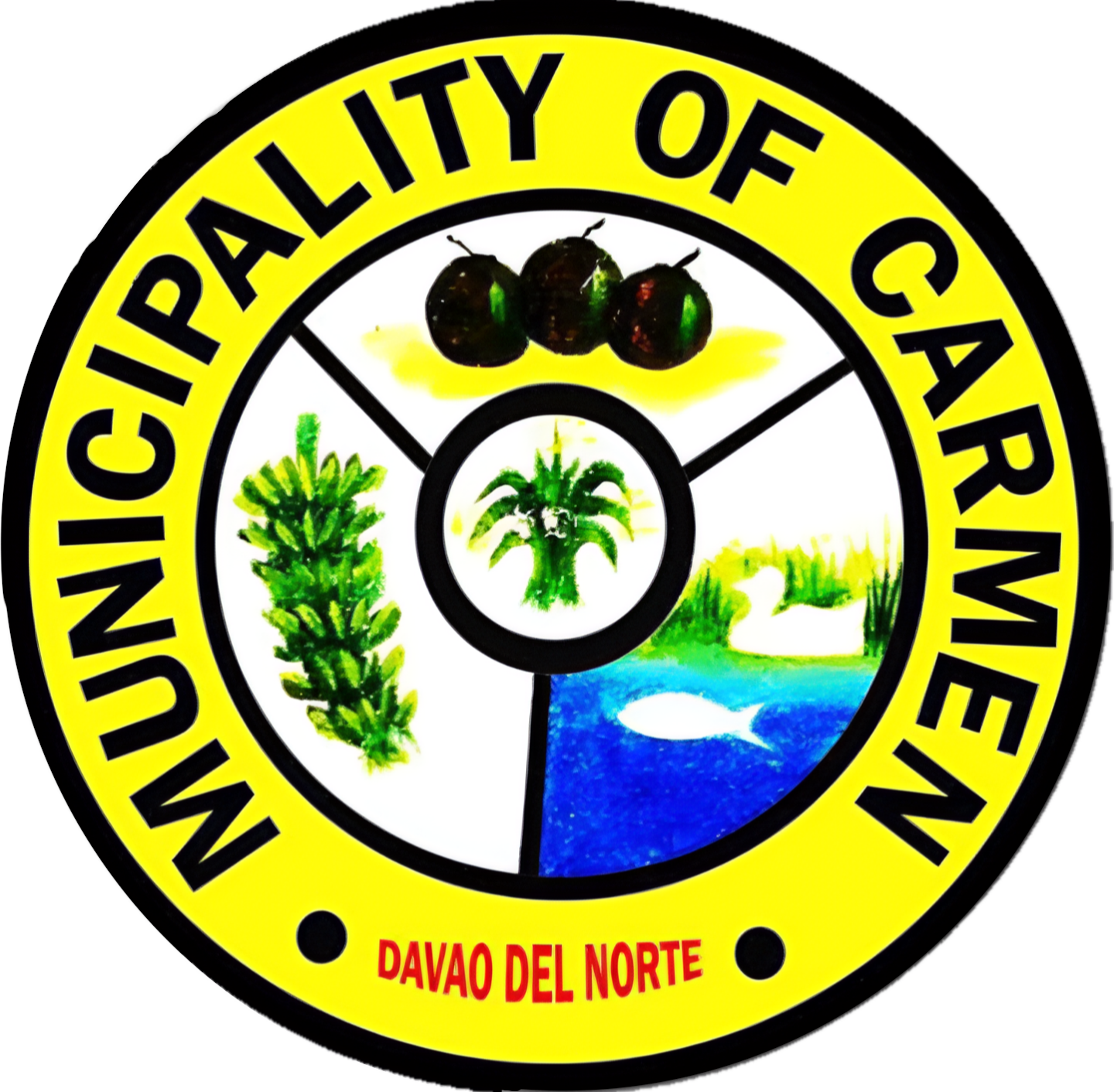
- Flag Seal
- Motto(s): "Basta Carmen, Trabaho Pa"
- Anthem: Carmen Hymn
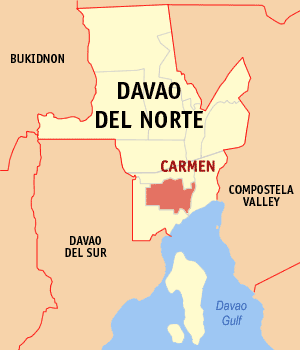
- Map of Davao del Norte with Carmen highlighted
- Interactive map of Carmen
- Location within Philippines
- Coordinates: 7°21′23″N 125°42′19″E
- Country: Philippines
- Region: Davao Region
- Province: Davao del Norte
- District: 2nd district
- Founded: May 6, 1966; 60 years ago
- Named for: Doña Carmen Veloso
- Barangays: 20 (see Barangays)

Government
  - Type: Sangguniang Bayan
  - Mayor: Leonidas R. Bahague
  - Vice Mayor: Marchell J. Perandos
  - Representative: Jose Manuel "JM" Lagdameo
  - Municipal Council: Members: Christian Bahague; Liza Adran; Roselyn Buen; Cathy Inso; Joel Espina; Abet Sarin; Jun Andales; Bongbor Relampagos
  - Electorate: 52,421 voters (2025)

Area
  - Total: 169.1 km^{2} (65.3 sq mi)
- Elevation: 16 m (52 ft)
- Highest elevation: 135 m (443 ft)
- Lowest elevation: 0 m (0 ft)

Population (2024 census)
  - Total: 85,423
  - Density: 505.2/km^{2} (1,308/sq mi)
  - Households: 19,872

Economy
  - Income class: 1st municipal income class
  - Poverty incidence: 15.79% (2023)
  - Revenue: ₱ 448.2 million (2024)
  - Assets: ₱ 1,973 million (2024)
  - Expenditure: ₱ 452 million (2024)
  - Liabilities: ₱ 774.5 million (2024)

Service provider
  - Electricity: Davao Light and Power Company (DLPC)
  - Water: Carmen Water District, South Balibago Resources, Inc.
  - Telecommunications: Globe, Smart, DITO, PLDT, StarLink
  - Cable TV: Cignal TV, Sky Cable, GSAT
  - Largest Barangay in Terms of Land Area: Brgy. Alejal
  - Largest Barangay in Terms of Population: Brgy. Ising
- Time zone: UTC+8 (PST)
- ZIP code: 8101
- PSGC: 1102303000
- IDD : area code: +63 (0)84
- Native languages: Davawenyo; Cebuano; Ata Manobo; Kalagan; Tagalog
- Patron saint: Our Lady of Mount Carmel

Carmen (Tagalog: ['kaɾmɛn]), officially the Municipality of Carmen (Cebuano: Lungsod sa Carmen; Tagalog: Bayan ng Carmen), is a first-class municipality in the province of Davao del Norte, Philippines. According to the 2024 census, it has a population of 88,745 people and a daily foot traffic of more than 250,000 people, mainly because of its strategic location in the Pan-Philiipine Highway (Maharlika Highway).

== History ==
Carmen was once part of Tagum in 1941, and then municipality of Panabo in 1949 in the undivided province of Davao. It was by virtue of Republic Act 4745 enacted by the defunct Philippine Congress that the new municipality was created on June 18, 1966. Carmen was named in memory of Doña Carmen Veloso, then wife of Congressman Ismael Veloso whose ancestors came from Carmen, Cebu.

During World War II, many Filipinos joined military units that resisted the Japanese invaders. In Carmen, locals fought during the war and drove away the Japanese army then stationed in Barangay Ising. The Battle of Ising is being remembered with a 30 feet (9.1 m) high monument built on the same spot the battle took place, which was just a few meters away from the Japanese garrison. The Veterans Memorial Shrine, just along the national highway, records some of the names of those who participated, and has become a tourist attraction in Carmen.

== Geography ==
Carmen is about 38 kilometres (24 mi) from Davao City, 6 kilometers (3 mi) from Panabo City and about 17 kilometres (11 mi) from Tagum City, the capital of Davao del Norte, has a total land area of 16,910 hectares (41,800 acres). Carmen has vast rice fields while its coastal areas provide fishermen a major source of livelihood such as mud crab fattening and fishing. Carmen is also a part of Davao Metropolitan Area.

=== Climate ===
Climate data for Carmen, Davao del Norte
Month	Jan	Feb	Mar	Apr	May	Jun	Jul	Aug	Sep	Oct	Nov	Dec	Year
Mean daily maximum °C (°F)	29 (84)	30 (86)	30 (86)	30 (86)	31 (88)	31 (88)	30 (86)	30 (86)	30 (86)	30 (86)	30 (86)	30 (86)	30 (86)
Mean daily minimum °C (°F)	22 (72)	22 (72)	22 (72)	22 (72)	23 (73)	24 (75)	24 (75)	24 (75)	24 (75)	24 (75)	23 (73)	22 (72)	23 (73)
Average precipitation mm (inches)	98 (3.9)	86 (3.4)	91 (3.6)	83 (3.3)	133 (5.2)	158 (6.2)	111 (4.4)	101 (4.0)	94 (3.7)	117 (4.6)	131 (5.2)	94 (3.7)	1,297 (51.2)
Average rainy days	16.4	14.3	16.3	18.5	25.3	25.0	23.8	21.9	20.8	24.4	24.3	18.7	249.7
Source: Meteoblue (Use with caution: this is modeled/calculated data, not measured locally.)

=== Barangays ===
The municipality of Carmen is politically subdivided into 20 barangays. Each barangay consists of puroks while some have sitios.

- Alejal
- Anibongan
- Asuncion
- Cebulano
- Guadalupe
- Ising (Poblacion)
- La Paz
- Mabaus
- Mabuhay
- Magsaysay
- Mangalcal
- Minda
- New Camiling
- Salvacion
- San Isidro
- Sto. Niño
- Taba
- Tibulao
- Tubod
- Tuganay

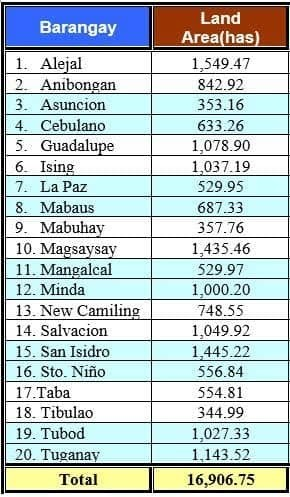
These are the barangays in Carmen, Davao del Norte in terms of land area (in hectares).

== Demographics ==
Population census of Carmen
Year	Pop.	±% p.a.
1970	20,385	—
1975	23,163	+2.60%
1980	30,719	+5.81%
1990	49,507	+4.89%
1995	56,260	+2.42%
2000	55,144	−0.43%
2007	61,656	+1.55%
2010	69,199	+4.29%
2015	74,679	+1.46%
2020	82,018	+1.99%
2024	85,423	+0.98%
Source: Philippine Statistics Authority

== Economy ==
Poverty incidence of Carmen (%)

Source: Philippine Statistics Authority

Carmen, Davao del Norte is known as the "Balut Capital of the Davao Region" due to its long and extensive history of duck-raising and balut-making, which caters not only to the municipality but also other towns and cities in the Davao Region.

Carmen is also home of several industries, manufacturing plants, shopping mall such as Gaisano Grand Mall of Carmen, and small and medium enterprises.

The economy of Carmen is strong due to agricultural exports, its geographic location, the thriving commercial sector and local industries. It is not reliant on one company or industry, but a growing rural-urban economy.

The largest Citihardware warehouse in Mindanao is located in Brgy. La Paz, Carmen, Davao del Norte. Moreover, the largest feedmill in Mindanao, UNAHCO, is located in Brgy. Sto. Nino, Carmen, Davao del Norte. Gaisano Grand Mall is the first community mall of Carmen, Davao del Norte. Wilcon Depot- Carmen Branch will soon rise in Carmen, Davao del Norte, as the groundbreaking ceremony has been done already.

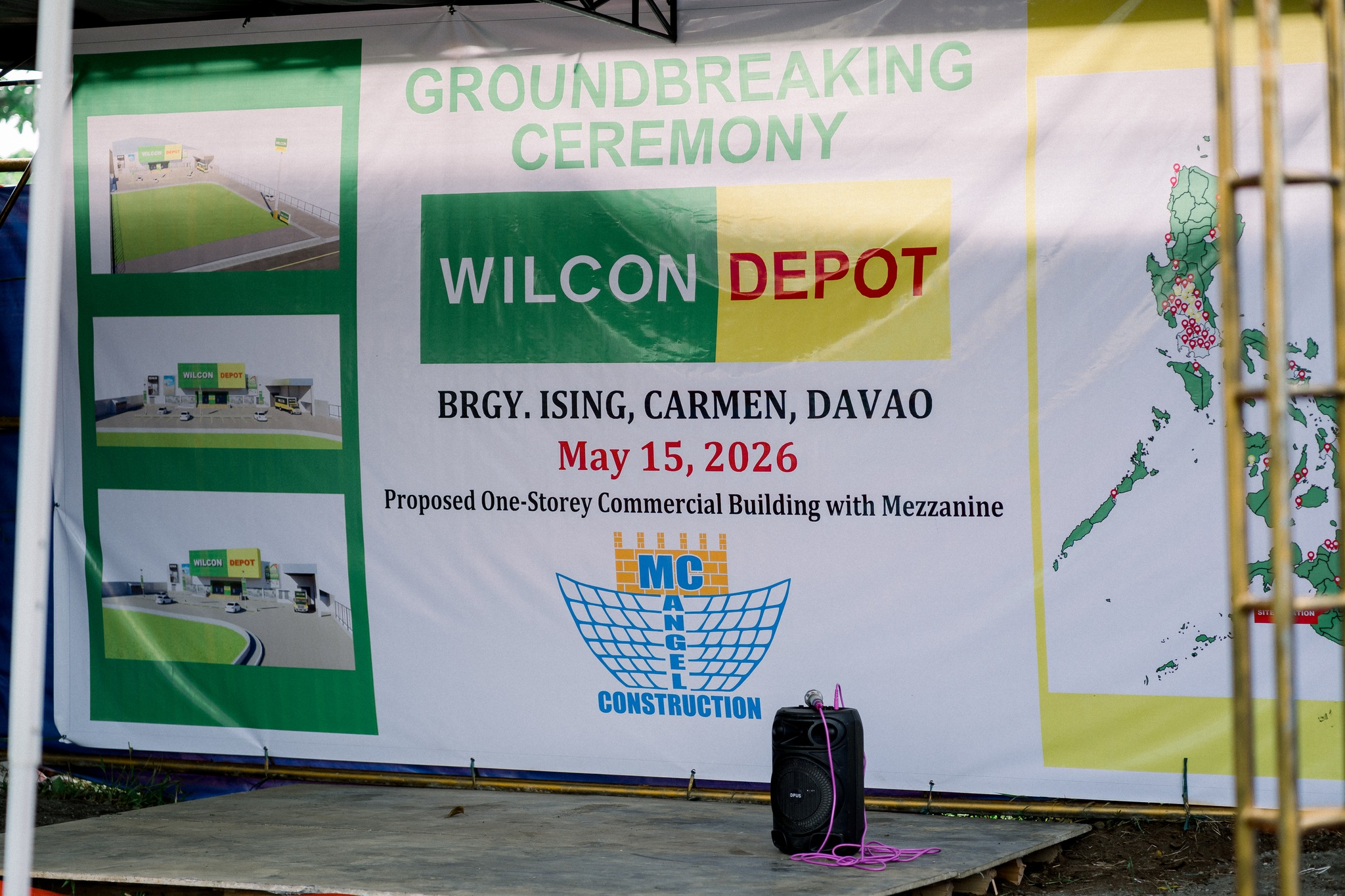
A large investment has also entered the town of Carmen after the groundbreaking ceremony for the new Wilcon Depot Inc. Carmen branch was officially held

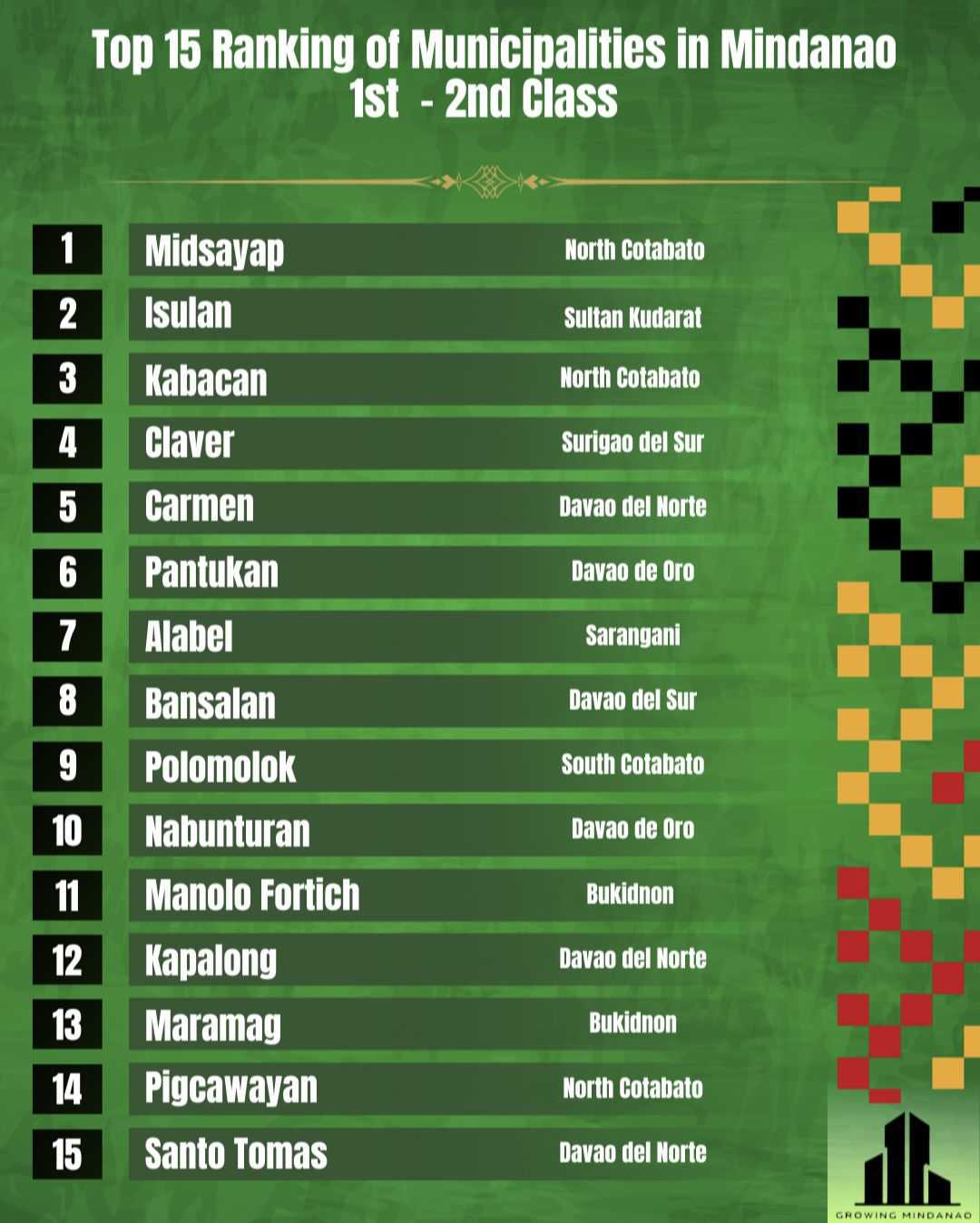
Carmen, Davao del Norte ranked 5th as the Most Competitive Municipality (1st and 2nd Class) in Mindanao based on 2023 Cities and Municipalities Competitiveness Index (CMCI).

Carmen, Davao del Norte ranked 5th as the Most Competitive municipality under 1st and 2nd Class municipalities in Mindanao based on 2023 Cities and Municipalities Competitiveness Index (CMCI).

Carmen was hailed as the 2nd richest municipality in the entire Davao Region based on Assets, as reported by the Commission on Audit (COA) 2024 Annual Financial Report on Local Government Units.

The ranking highlights the financial standing and resource capacity of local governments across the region, reflecting their economic performance and fiscal management.

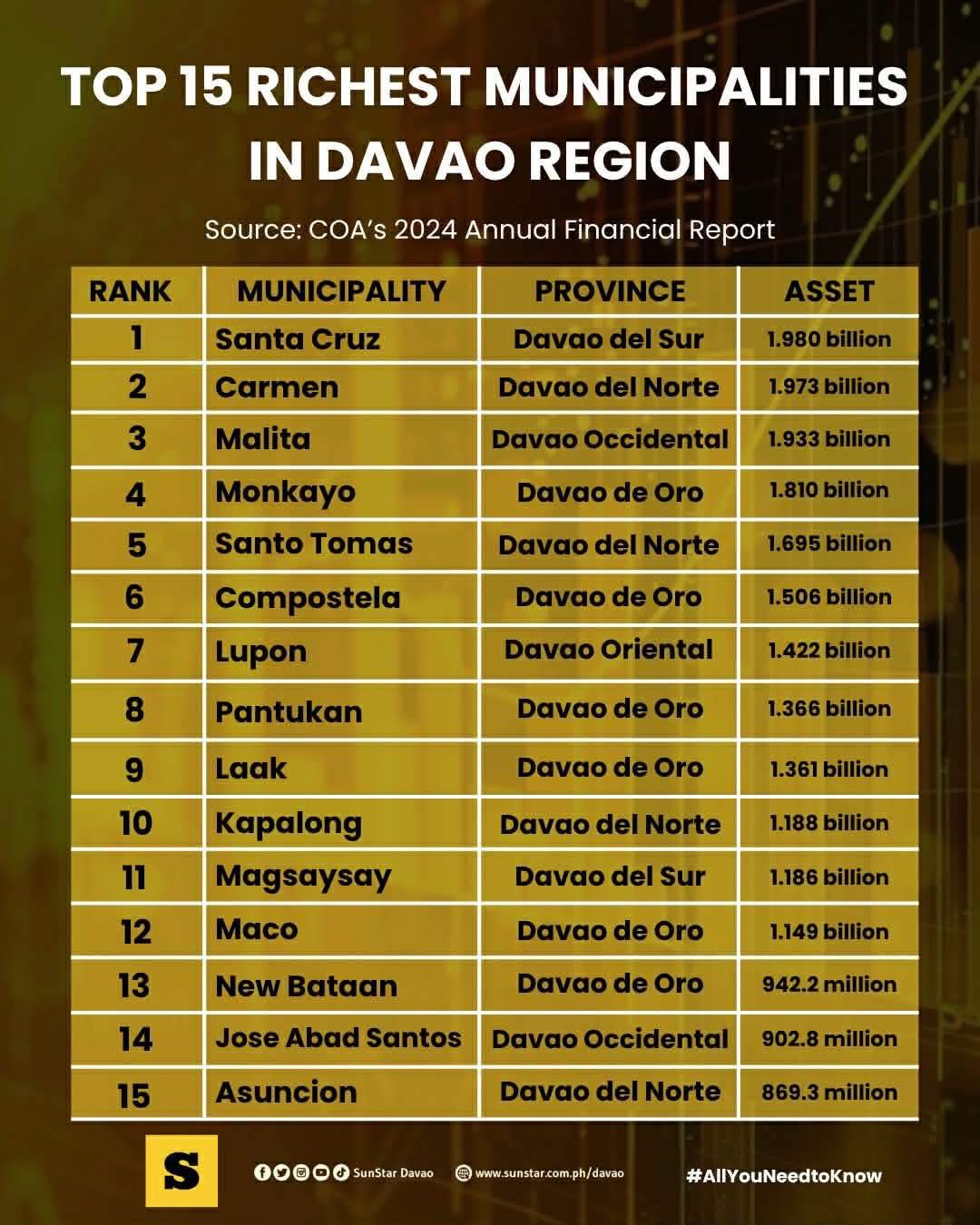
Carmen, Davao del Norte was hailed as the 2nd richest municipality in Davao Region based on Assets, as reported by Commission on Audit (COA) 2024 Annual Financial Report on Local Government Units.

== Government ==
Elected officials of Carmen for the term of 2025-Present

- Mayor: Leonidas Bahague
- Vice Mayor: Marchell Perandos
- Councilors:
  - Christian Bahague
  - Liza Adran
  - Roselyn Buen
  - Cathy Inso
  - Joel Espina
  - Abet Sarin
  - Jun Andales
  - Bongbor Relampagos

== Transportation ==
The primary transportation infrastructure in Carmen is primarily facilitated by its proximity to the Maharlika Highway, a major national route that links Davao to Agusan, making it very accessible for buses, jeepneys, vans and personal cars. This is complemented by the Saturnino R. Silva Road, a local road that links barangays to the highway going to the town of Santo Tomas.

Carmen is 10-12 kilometers from Tagum City, 5-7 kilometers from Panabo City and 30-35 kilometers from Davao City, making it a very accessible municipality for commuting, trading and transportation purposes in the Davao Region.

== Education ==
Carmen has several public and private institutions:

Tertiary:

- Davao del Norte State College- Carmen Campus

Secondary:

- Carmen National High School
- Carmen National High School- Tibulao Extension
- Carmen National High School- Guadalupe Extension
- Alejal National High School
- Alia National High School
- Anibongan National High School
- La Paz National High School
- Mabuhay National High School
- Tubod National High School
- Ezra Mission Academy (Private)

Elementary:

- Carmen Central Elementary School SpEd Center
- Alejal Elementary School
- Anibongan Elementary School
- Asuncion Elementary School
- Cebulano Elementary School
- Guadalupe Elementary School
- Mabaus Elementary School
- Mabuhay Elementary School
- Magsaysay Elementary School
- Mangalcal Elementary School
- Minda Elementary School
- New Camiling Elementary School
- New Maligaya Elementary School
- Pinta Sabarat Elementary School
- Salvacion Elementary School
- San Isidro Elementary School
- Santo Nino Elementary School
- Taba Elementary School
- Tibulao Elementary School
- Tubod Elementary School
- Tuganay Elementary School

== Culture ==
"Kahayag Festival" is an event that showcases the town's Christmas preparations, where "kahayag" translates to light, which represents hope, joy and solidarity in the Advent period. It is typically marked by Christmas lighting and colorful fireworks display, where streets and public areas are lit up to mark the start of the Christmas season. Beyond being a holiday celebration, the festival is a testament to the Filipino penchant for early Christmas, where the community and families gather together in anticipation, generosity and thankfulness as they gear up for the birth of Jesus Christ.
