= Santa Cruz, Davao del Sur =

Municipality in Davao del Sur, Philippines

Santa Cruz
- Municipality
- Municipality of Santa Cruz
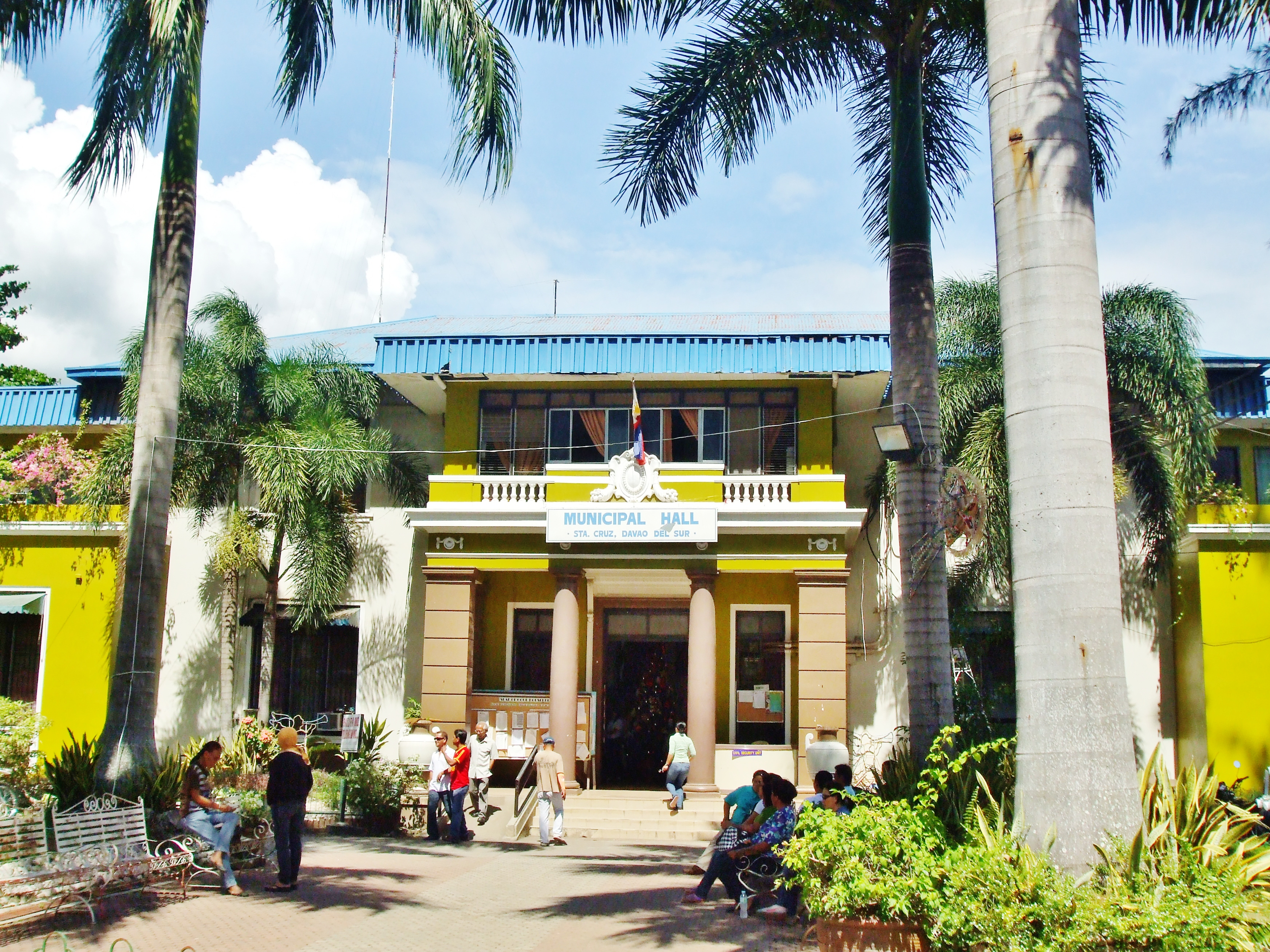
- Municipal Hall

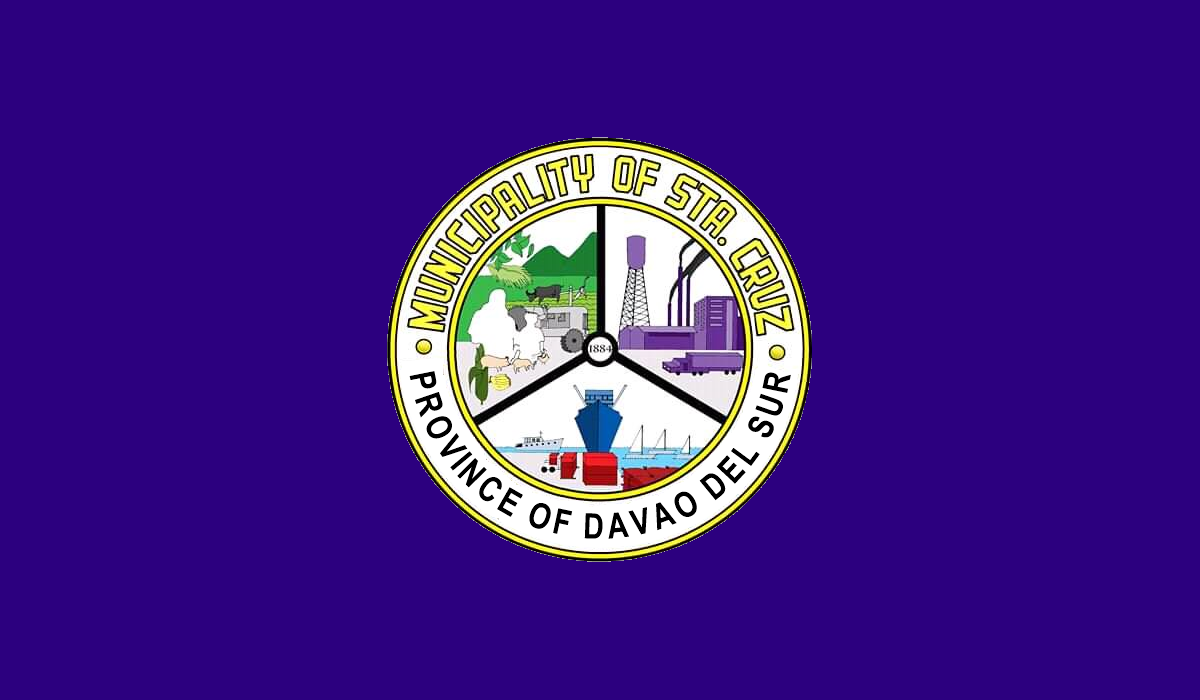
- Flag Seal

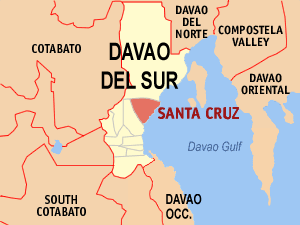
- Map of Davao del Sur with Santa Cruz highlighted
- Interactive map of Santa Cruz
- Location within the Philippines
- Coordinates: 6°50′N 125°25′E
- Country: Philippines
- Region: Davao Region
- Province: Davao del Sur
- District: Lone district
- Founded: October 5, 1884
- Barangays: 18 (see Barangays)

Government
  - Type: Sangguniang Bayan
  - Mayor: Jose Nelson Z. Sala, Sr.
  - Vice Mayor: Charlotte F. Gallego
  - Representative: John Tracy F. Cagas
  - Municipal Council: Members: Jose Nelson Z. Sala Sr.; Charlotte F. Gallego; Anselmo A. Datu; Nestor B. Crave; Michelle O. Orpilla; Apolinar C. Ugdoracion Jr.; Michel Louise R. Bajo; Ronald R. Cruda
  - Electorate: 71,060 voters (2025)

Area
  - Total: 319.91 km^{2} (123.52 sq mi)
- Elevation: 53 m (174 ft)
- Highest elevation: 539 m (1,768 ft)
- Lowest elevation: 0 m (0 ft)

Population (2024 census)
  - Total: 104,793
  - Density: 327.57/km^{2} (848.40/sq mi)
  - Households: 26,424

Economy
  - Income class: 1st municipal income class
  - Poverty incidence: 15.78% (2023)
  - Revenue: ₱ 764.4 million (2024)
  - Assets: ₱ 1,980 million (2024)
  - Expenditure: ₱ 620.7 million (2024)
  - Liabilities: ₱ 662.8 million (2024)

Service provider
  - Electricity: Davao del Sur Electric Cooperative (DASURECO)
- Time zone: UTC+8 (PST)
- ZIP code: 8001
- PSGC: 1102412000
- IDD : area code: +63 (0)82
- Native languages: Davawenyo; Cebuano; Obo; Kalagan; Tagalog; Ata Manobo
- Website: stacruz.gov.ph

Santa Cruz, officially the Municipality of Santa Cruz (Cebuano: Lungsod sa Santa Cruz; Tagalog: Bayan ng Santa Cruz), is a municipality in the province of Davao del Sur, Philippines. According to the 2024 census, it has a population of 104,793 people.

The Municipality of Santa Cruz is part of Metropolitan Davao as it shares borders with Davao City.

== History ==
Santa Cruz is the oldest municipality in the province; it was founded on October 5, 1884, thirty-six years after the foundation of Davao, which is its mother city, by Don José Uyanguren of Guipúzcoa, Spain. Spanish pioneers and missionaries attempted to settle and Christianize the area in what is now Barangay Poblacion as early as 1880. Due to the staunch Islamic faith of the local people, the enraged pioneers and missionaries planted a cross under a shelter to mark the failure of the missionaries to convert these people to Christianity; the town's name now bears the name of the cross planted by those Spaniards. Over the following years, many locals submitted to Christianity and were conquered by Angel Rodriguez, the Spanish Governor-General of Davao. Like Don Uyanguren's attempt to develop the newly established Davao, the area did not prosper for another two decades.

The Americans arrived in Davao in the early 1900s after the Spanish defeat in the Spanish–American War. Fourteen years later, the town began to grow economically, although overshadowed by the booming economic growth of its neighbour Davao.

On March 16, 1936, its mother town, Davao, became one of the first two cities in Mindanao, the other being Zamboanga, due to the town's faster economic growth and agricultural boom.

In 1942, it was the beginning of Japanese invasion of the Philippines. The town suffered greatly during the Japanese occupation of the Philippines, unlike its neighbor Davao, which fared well and continued its economic growth during that time. The local recognized guerrillas and the military troops of the Philippine Commonwealth Army units continued to attack the Imperial Japanese forces. In 1945, combined Filipino and American troops including recognized guerrillas fought the Japanese and liberated the town. The general headquarters of the Philippine Commonwealth Army and Philippine Constabulary was active from 1945 to 1946 and was located in the town. After the war, most of the inhabitants of Santa Cruz moved to Davao in search of economic opportunities; despite this, the town continued its population and economic growth, though at a slower rate.

Almost three years after the Philippine Independence on July 4, 1946, two towns broke off from the municipality, namely: Padada, on July 15, 1949; and Digos on July 19 in the same year. In the 1960s, a new municipality, Roxas, was carved out from the town, covering the present-day barangays of Inauayan, Darong, Astorga, Coronon, and Sibulan; however, the Supreme Court of the Philippines nullified the creation of the municipality since this meant the collapse of the jurisdiction of once the most Christianized town in Mindanao.

One of the municipalities which broke off from the town, Digos, became the capital town of the newly created Davao del Sur province in 1967; thirty-three years later it would become a city and will be the most populous in the entire province, excluding Davao City.

On June 28, 2003, Monkayo Mayor Joel Brillantes, owner of JB Mining Management Corp., was assassinated by barangay tanod Aniceto "Sitoy" Dejeto Jr. in a cockfighting arena in Matina, Davao City. Among the alleged perpetrators of the assassination was mining magnate and Santa Cruz politician Jose Nelson "Tata" Z. Sala Sr. whom President Gloria Macapagal Arroyo explicitly accused as a murderer alongside his brother Edgar for the 2003 assassination. By November 2006, Sala was deemed a wanted fugitive by the National Bureau of Investigation, with Davao City Congressman Prospero Nograles running a newspaper advertisement in 2007 that promises a two million peso bounty for Sala's capture. Davao City Mayor Rodrigo Duterte defended Sala against Nograles, claiming that he did not have a withstanding warrant of arrest. In 2009, during an investigation by the Commission on Human Rights in Davao City, Sala was named by a witness as a perpetrator in Brillantes's assassination alongside Dejeto and Reynaldo "Tiwi" Cajes.

Sala later managed to be elected municipal councilor in 2016 and 2019, and Santa Cruz mayor in 2022 and 2025. In July 2024, during the Senate investigation into Bamban, Tarlac mayor Alice Guo's links to a Philippine offshore gaming operator, it was revealed that thousands of Philippine birth certificates issued in Santa Cruz had been falsified for Chinese nationals. On November 25, 2025, Oscar "Dodong" Bucol Jr., a barangay captain from Digos and a vocal critic of Sala, was livestreaming on Facebook about receiving death threats when he was killed by gunfire at his garage; Sala denied any involvement in the murder.

== Geography ==
Santa Cruz is situated in the northern part of Davao del Sur. Bounded by Davao City on the north and south by the city of Digos. After undergoing several political subdivisions, 27,960 hectares of land was left representing 6.7% of the total land area of Davao del Sur. Forest land comprises 60% and the rest includes the 8 coastal barangays in the area.

The land area of Santa Cruz per Board of Technical Survey and Maps is 27,960 hectares. However, based on the Field Appraisal and Assessment Sheets (FAAS) and Tax Maps of the Municipal Assessor's Office the total land area of the municipality is 28,759.7855 or about 7.31% of the province's area (393,401 hectares). This excludes the Kapatagan contested area. Among the 18 barangays, Sibulan has the biggest land area of 6,390.6581 hectares or 22.22% of the total land area. Poblacion Zone III has the smallest area of 105.3148, only 0.37% of the total.

=== Topography ===
Santa Cruz is traversed by mountain ranges and high relief that include part of Mount Apo, the highest mountain peak in the Philippines, straddle the south, central, north and north-western portions of the municipality. The rugged topography of the central area gradually undulates toward the coastal plains of the north-eastern, eastern and south-eastern parts. Here, settlements sprawl contiguously along the coast of Davao Gulf under the vast monotony of coconut plantations. On the western frontier, a plateau stretches toward Barangay Kapatagan of Digos. The municipal elevation ranges from 10 to 2,939 metres (33 to 9,642 ft) above sea level (m.a.s.1.).

=== Climate ===
Climate data for Santa Cruz, Davao del Sur
Month	Jan	Feb	Mar	Apr	May	Jun	Jul	Aug	Sep	Oct	Nov	Dec	Year
Mean daily maximum °C (°F)	31 (88)	31 (88)	32 (90)	32 (90)	31 (88)	30 (86)	30 (86)	30 (86)	31 (88)	30 (86)	30 (86)	31 (88)	31 (88)
Mean daily minimum °C (°F)	22 (72)	22 (72)	22 (72)	23 (73)	24 (75)	24 (75)	23 (73)	23 (73)	23 (73)	23 (73)	23 (73)	22 (72)	23 (73)
Average precipitation mm (inches)	51 (2.0)	41 (1.6)	38 (1.5)	45 (1.8)	82 (3.2)	108 (4.3)	114 (4.5)	120 (4.7)	95 (3.7)	96 (3.8)	76 (3.0)	52 (2.0)	918 (36.1)
Average rainy days	13.2	12.0	13.8	15.3	22.5	23.9	25.2	25.4	23.3	24.1	21.0	16.8	236.5
Source: Meteoblue (modeled/calculated data, not measured locally)

Santa Cruz has a favorable climate all year round characterized by wet and dry seasons. It is outside the typhoon belt. Generally the months of November to April are dry periods. Wet season occurs from May to October. This type of climate is observable in the plain and coastal areas. In the mountainous barangays, the fourth type of climate is consistently experienced. Rainfall is more or less evenly distributed throughout the year. Most often in these areas heavy downpour occurs every afternoon while in the morning the sun shines.

=== Barangays ===
Santa Cruz is politically subdivided into 18 barangays. Each barangay consists of puroks while some have sitios.

Of the 18 barangays, 7 are uplands, 9 are upland-lowland and coastal and 2 are lowland-coastal.

- Astorga
- Bato
- Coronon
- Darong
- Inawayan
- Jose Rizal
- Matutungan
- Melilia
- Saliducon
- Sibulan
- Sinoron
- Tagabuli
- Tibolo
- Tuban
- Zone I (Poblacion)
- Zone II (Poblacion)
- Zone III (Poblacion)
- Zone IV (Poblacion)

== Demographics ==
Population census of Santa Cruz
Year	Pop.	±% p.a.
1918	7,618	—
1939	33,808	+7.35%
1948	54,772	+5.51%
1960	24,401	−6.52%
1970	34,762	+3.60%
1975	41,834	+3.78%
1980	48,276	+2.90%
1990	56,048	+1.50%
1995	59,139	+1.01%
2000	67,317	+2.82%
2007	76,113	+1.71%
2010	81,093	+2.33%
2015	90,987	+2.22%
2020	101,125	+2.25%
2024	104,793	+0.86%
Source: Philippine Statistics Authority

=== Languages ===
The languages spoken here in the municipality are Davaoeño, Tagalog, Mansakan, and English.

== Economy ==
Poverty incidence of Santa Cruz (%)

Source: Philippine Statistics Authority

Agriculture: Among agricultural crops, coconut leads in production followed by banana and sugarcane. Other major crops are corn, coffee and vegetables. The municipality also produces high value fruits like mango, lanzones and durian. Cattle leads in livestock production.

Fisheries: The 24-kilometer long coastline of Santa Cruz, which forms part of Davao Gulf, provides a rich fishing grounds and is suitable for aquaculture.

Mining: Deposits of sulfur ore, rock phosphate, guano, limestone and cement raw materials were also traced but still have to be tapped for commercial and industrial uses.

Forestry: Tropical evergreen and other timber cover the vast timberland and forest area. Rattan, bamboo and other vines are also in abundance.

Major industries: Banana, Coconut, and Seaweed cultivation.

== Tourism ==
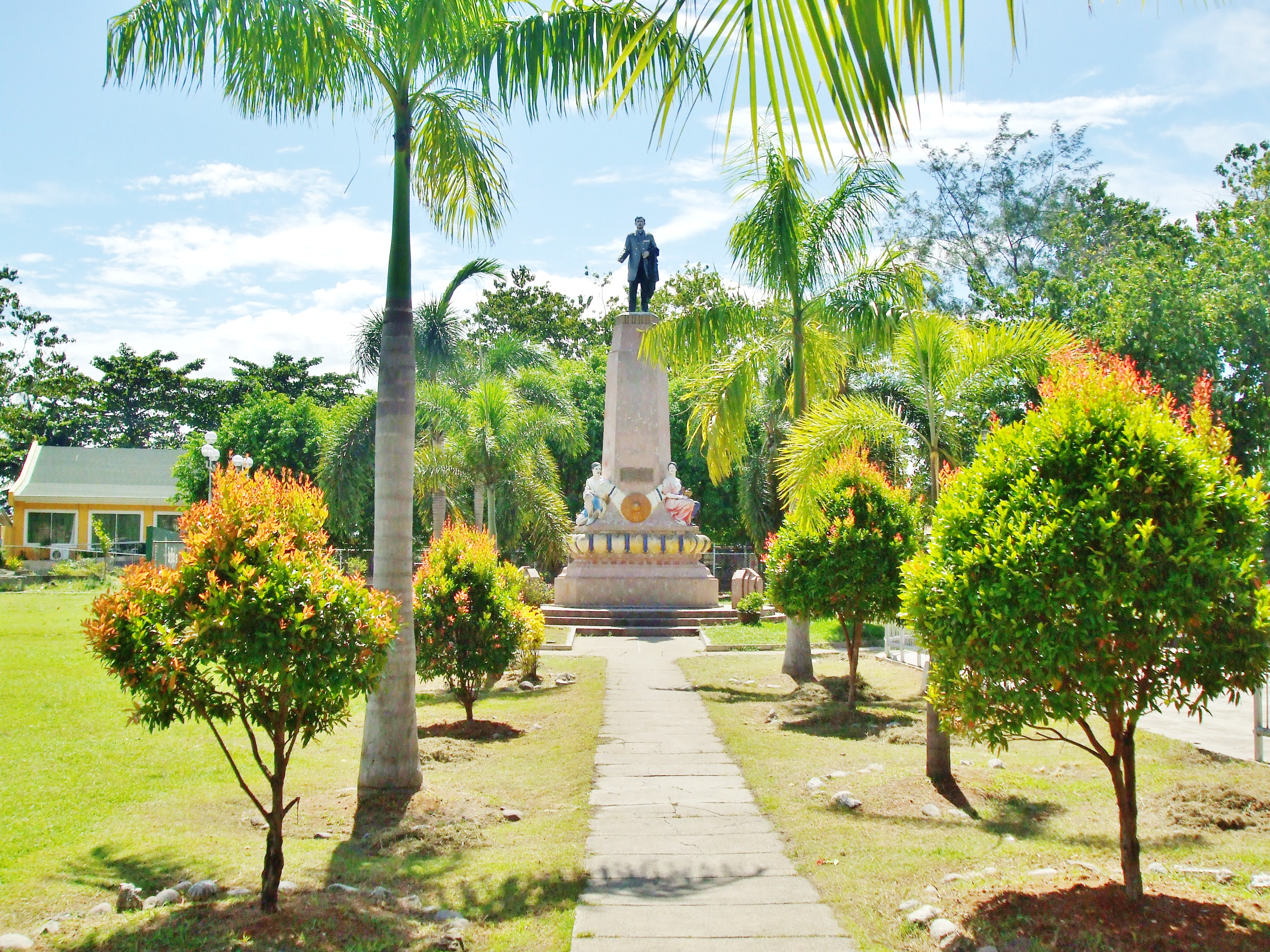
Rizal Park, Santa Cruz

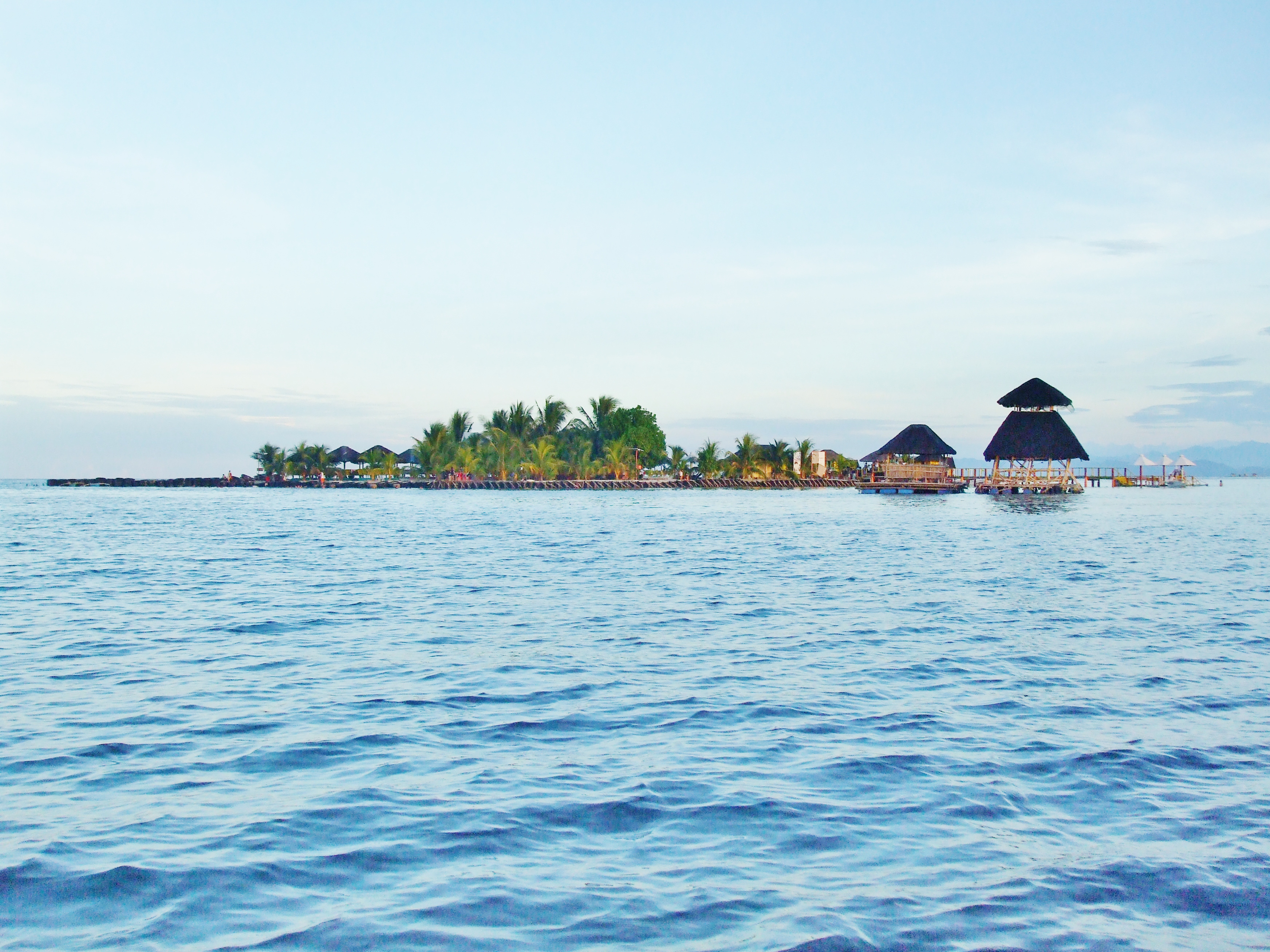
Passig Islet

A tourism destination in Southern Mindanao where eco-cultural and adventure tourism are managed and environmental protection is sustained through the partnership of the private sector and the government.

Sibulan - Mount Apo Trail
History revealed that the year 1880 marked the first successful climb to Mount Apo through the Sibulan Trail of Santa Cruz in Davao del Sur by a group led by Don Joaquin Rajal. Trekking along the trail will be highlighted with an assault via Boulder Face going to the summit of the country's highest peak.

Sibulan River White Water Tubing
Tubing along the rapids of Sibulan River using inflated tubes of rubber tires will drive one's adrenalin rush to the limits with the strong water current of the Sibulan River.

Tibolo Cultural Village
Learn the unique culture of the indigenous Bagobo-Tagabawa Tribe and enjoy the view of the entire Mt. Apo landscape and overlooking scenery of Davao City and Davao Gulf.

Bato and Tagabuli Seascape
Passig Islet in Barangay Bato and the Tagabuli Sea Rock Garden offer white sand beaches ideal for island hopping, scuba diving and fishing while giving the tourists a view of the symbiotic relationship of the ecosystem in the highlands down to the coastal system.

Other scenic spots include the Passig Islet Agro Eco Park and Tudaya Falls.

=== Events and festivals ===
Pista sa Kinaiyahan
A yearly activity conducted every last week of April as a tribute to the Mother Nature through tree-growing, cleanup activities and Boulder Face challenge.

Araw ng Santa Cruz
It is celebrated every October 5 in commemoration of the legal creation of the municipality in 1884. Highlights include parades, field demonstrations, trade fairs, carnivals and traditional festivities. Through Presidential Proclamation 659, October 5, 2024 was declared a special non-working day in celebration of its 140th "Araw ng Sta. Cruz" Founding Anniversary.

Sinabbadan Festival
A festival of ethnic ritual and dances celebrated every September.

== Transportation ==
Santa Cruz is accessible by land transportation vehicles plying the Davao-Digos, Davao-Kidapawan City, Davao-Cotabato City, Davao-Koronadal City and Davao-Tacurong City routes passing through the town's single, 27 kilometres (17 mi) stretch of national highway that traverses its 11 barangays. From Davao City, the administrative center of Region XI, it is 38 kilometres (24 mi) away within a 45-minute ride, while it is 16 kilometres (9.9 mi) or about 15-minute ride from provincial capital city of Digos.

Air and water transport is accessible in the area through the international air and sea ports located in Davao City. Traveling overland is catered to by the Santa Cruz Overland Transport Terminal. Concrete-paved national highway runs along Santa Cruz connecting the cities of Davao and General Santos and adjacent provinces like South Cotabato, Sultan Kudarat, Maguindanao and Cotabato Province. Jeepneys and buses are used widely for major routes plying across the town. Mostly tricycles operate in the poblacion (town center) and in neighboring barangays. Bikes are used for leisure and sporting events.

== Notable personalities ==
- Nesthy Petecio, Olympic medalist for boxing
- Ronald dela Rosa, politician, former police general
