= DXRS-TV =

Davao City; Philippines
- City: Davao City
- Channels: Analog: 23 (UHF); Digital: TBA (UHF)
- Branding: RJTV-23 Davao

Programming
- Subchannels: See list
- Affiliations: Independent

Ownership
- Owner: Rajah Broadcasting Network
- Sister stations: DXDJ

History
- Founded: 1994
- Former call signs: DXDJ-TV
- Former affiliations: Solar Entertainment Corporation / 2nd Avenue (2008-2018)
- Call sign meaning: DX; Rajah BroadcaSting Network; Radio Station

Technical information
- Power: 5 kW
- ERP: 10 KW

Links
- Website: www.RJplanet.com

RJTV 23 (DXRS-TV) is a UHF, free to air television channel, owned and operated by Rajah Broadcasting Network, Inc. owned by Ramon "RJ" Jacinto. This station studios and transmitters are located at Shrine Hills, Matina, Davao City.

== RJTV programs ==
Note: Two shows from RJTV continues airing (Thank God It's RJ Live! and RJ Sunday Jam) at 23:00 and 09:00 PHT respectively.

== See also ==
- DZRJ-DTV
- Rajah Broadcasting Network
