= Davao City =

Highly urbanized city in Davao Region, Philippines

Davao City Dakbayan sa Dabaw (Cebuano) Ciudad de Dávao
- Highly urbanized city
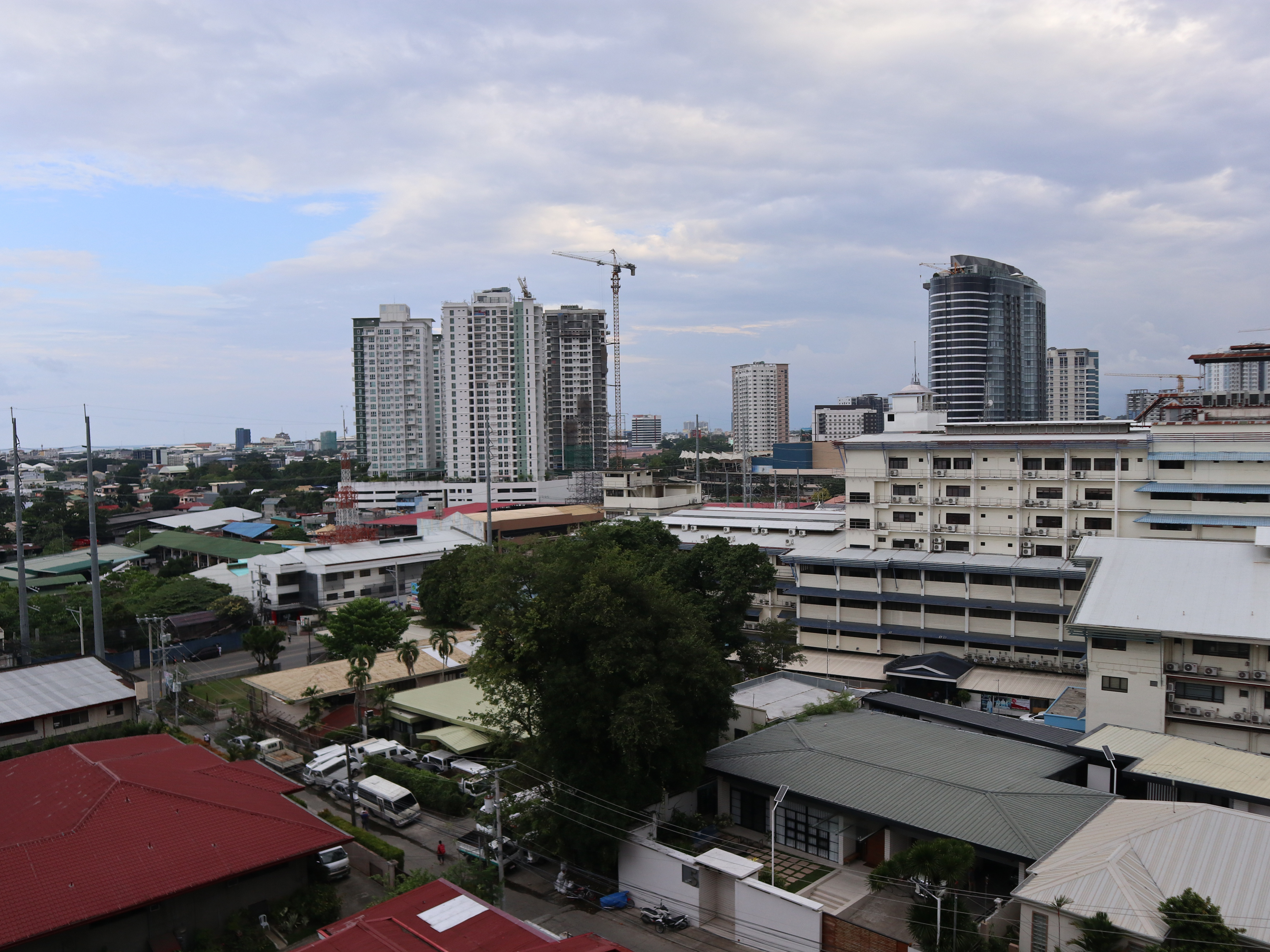
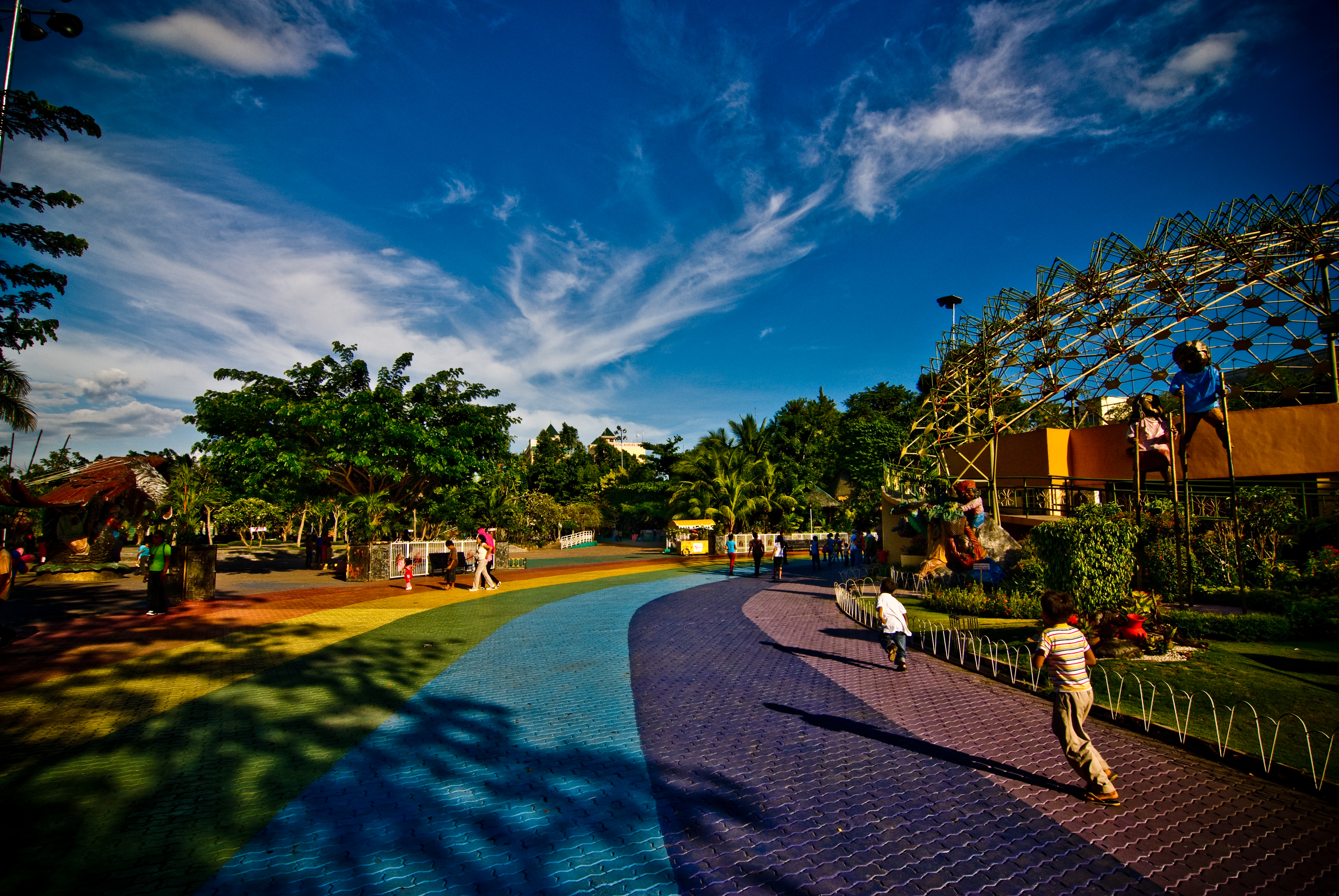
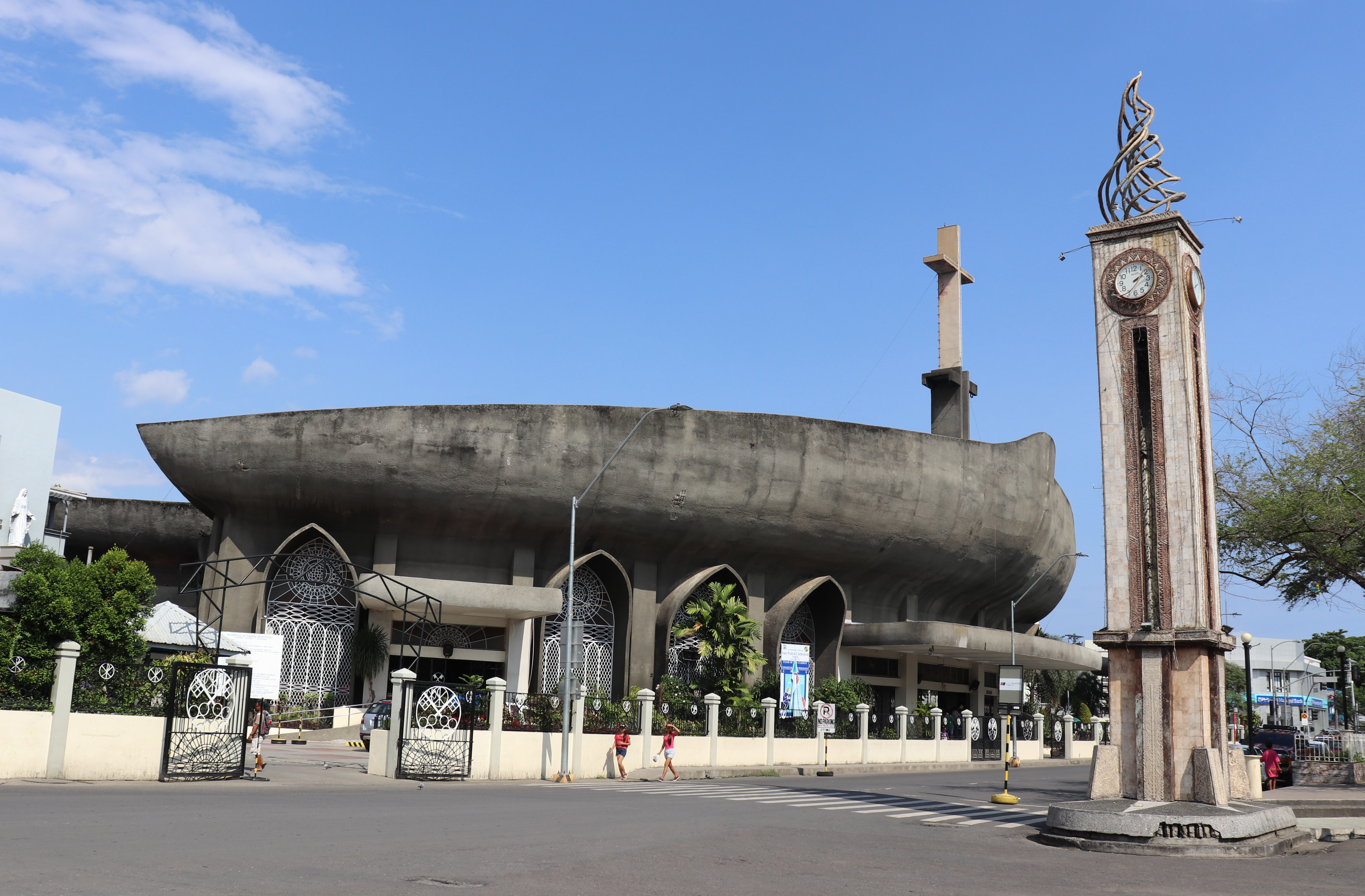
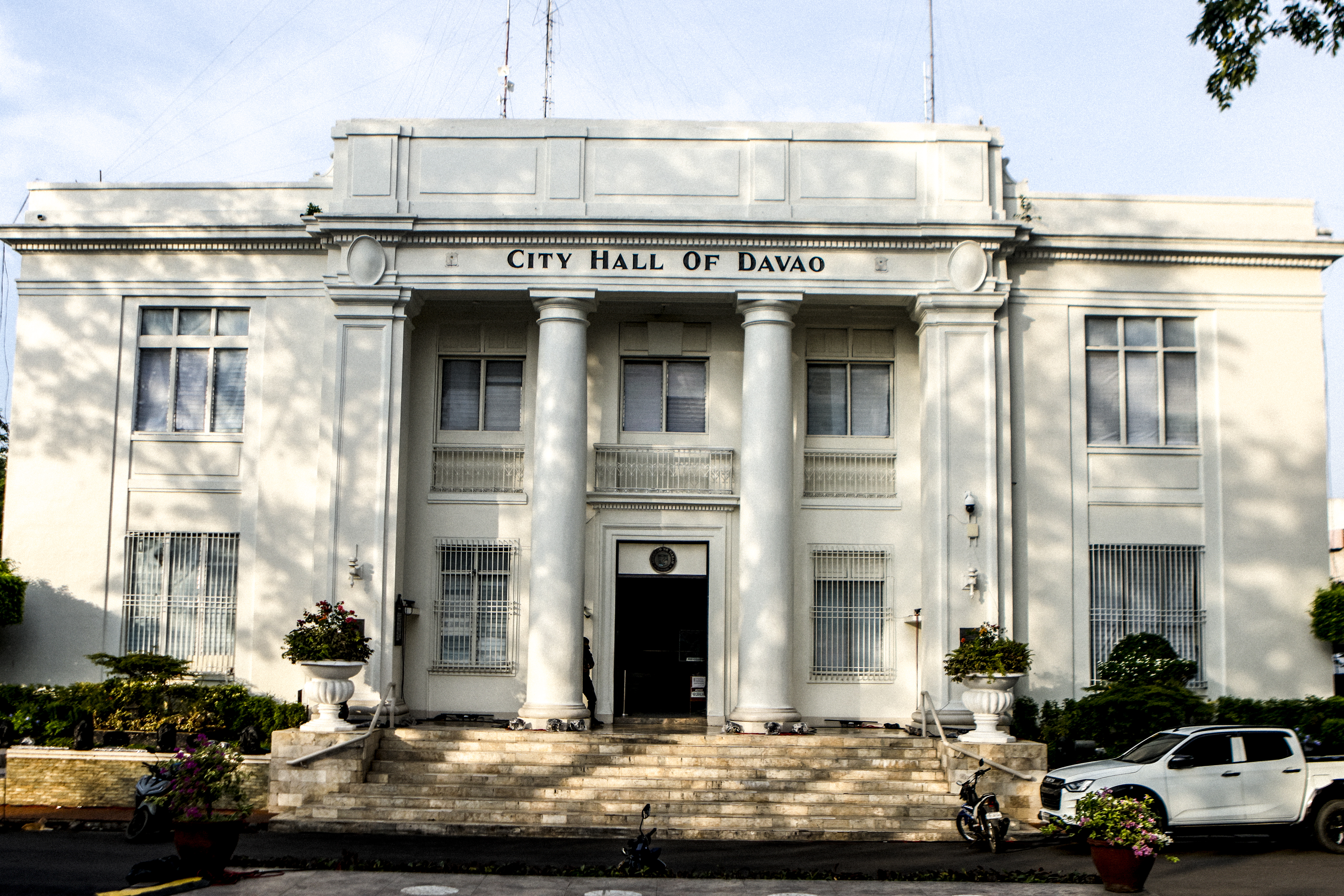
- Poblacion District skyline People's Park Davao Cathedral Davao City Hall KJC King Dome

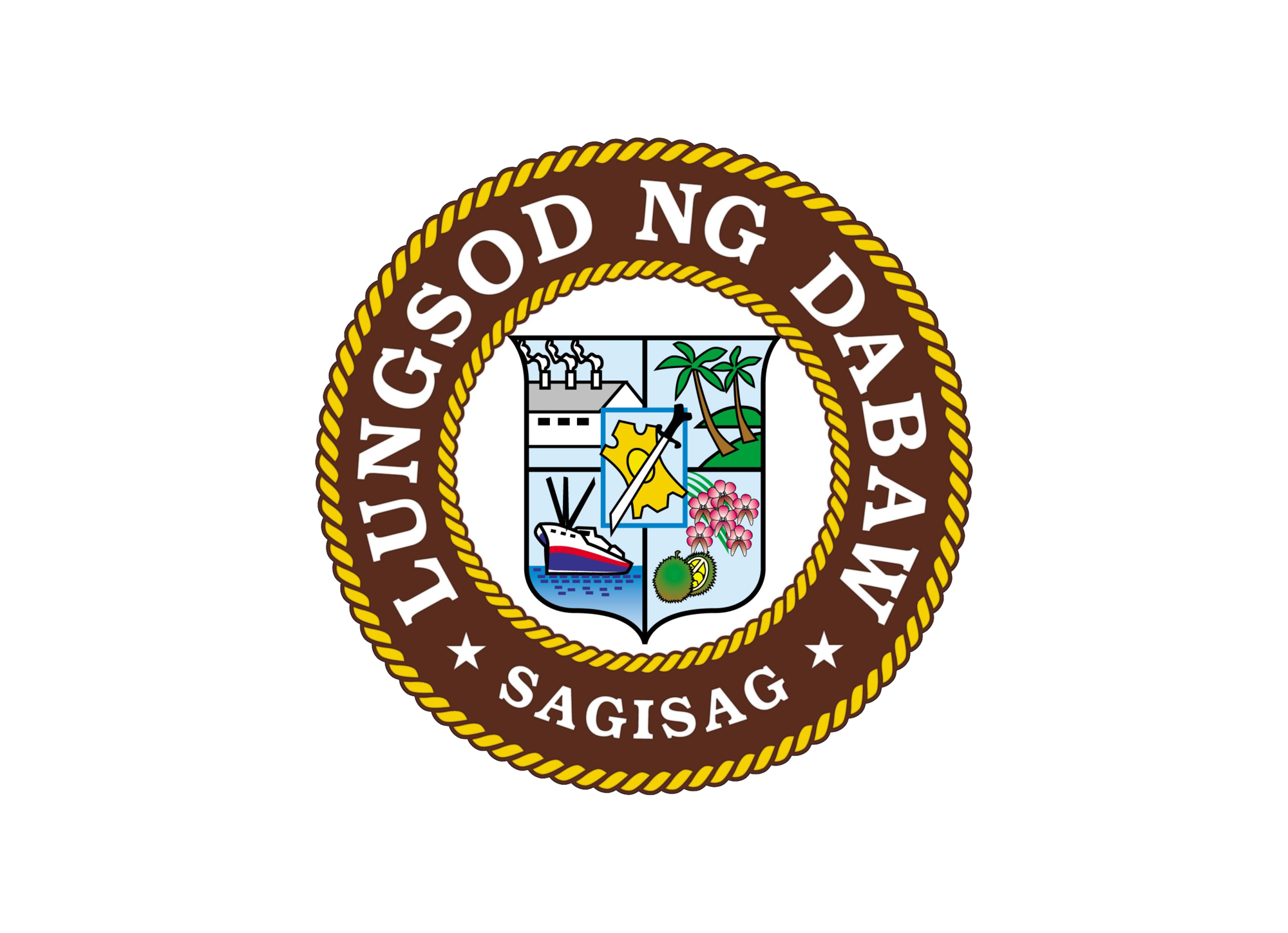
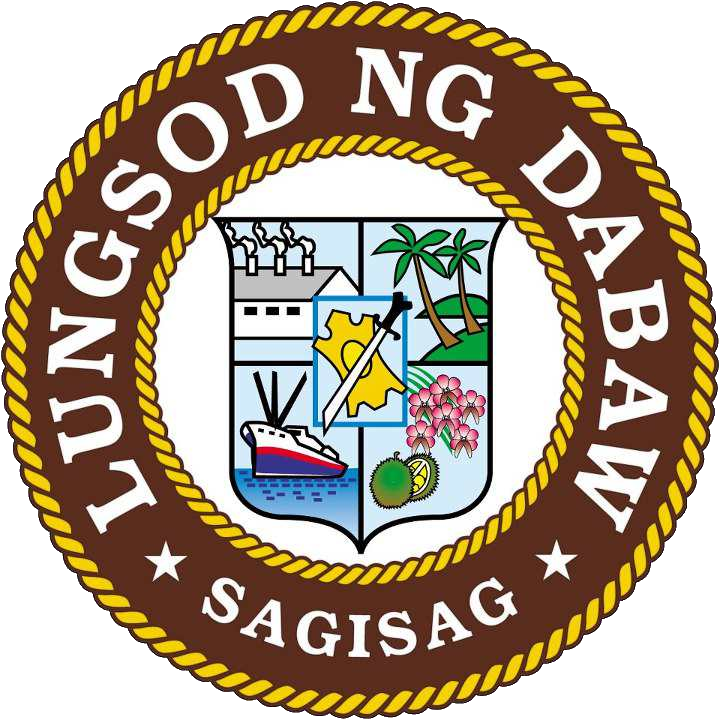
- Flag Seal Logo and wordmark
- Nicknames: "King City of the South"; "Crown Jewel of Mindanao"; "Durian Capital of the Philippines"; "Chocolate Capital of the Philippines"
- Motto: "Life is Here"
- Anthem: "Tayo'y Dabawenyo" ("We are Davaoeño")
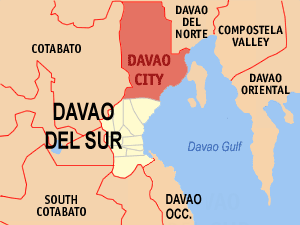
- Map of Davao Region with Davao City highlighted
- Interactive map of Davao City
- Location within the Philippines
- Coordinates: 7°03′58″N 125°36′34″E
- Country: Philippines
- Region: Davao Region
- Province: Davao del Sur (geographically only)
- District: 1st to 3rd districts
- Founded: 1830 (Pinagurasan); June 29, 1848 (Nueva Vergara); 1867 (renamed Davao)
- Chartered: October 16, 1936
- Cityhood: March 1, 1937
- Highly urbanized city: December 22, 1979
- Founder: Datu Bago (Pinagurasan); Don José Cruz de Oyanguren of Guipuzcoa, Spain (Nueva Vergara)
- Barangays: 182 (see Barangays)

Government
  - Type: Sangguniang Panlungsod
  - Mayor: Sebastian Duterte (PDP)/(HTL)
  - Vice Mayor: Rigo Duterte (HTL)
  - Representatives: List: 1st District; Paolo Duterte; 2nd District; Omar Duterte; 3rd District; Isidro Ungab
  - City Council: Members: 1st District; Ragde Niño P. Ibuyan; Luna Marie Dominique S. Acosta; Jessica M. Bonguyan; Temujin B. Ocampo; Pamela A. Librado; Bonz Andre A. Militar; J. Melchor B. Quitain Jr.; Vacant; 2nd District; Richlyn N. Justol-Baguilod; Danilo C. Dayanghirang; Louie John J. Bonguyan; Doce L. Apostol; Diosdado Angelo R. Mahipus; Arnolfo Ricardo B. Cabling; Ralph O. Abella; Al Ryan S. Alejandre; 3rd District; Alberto T. Ungab; Antoinette G. Principe; Trisha Ann J. Villafuerte; Myrna G. Dalodo-Ortiz; Bai Hundra N. Advincula; Rachel P. Zozobrado; Jose Marie Bernardo R. Baluran; Lorenzo Benjamin D. Villafuerte
  - Electorate: 1,006,592 voters (2025)

Area
  - Highly urbanized city: 2,443.61 km^{2} (943.48 sq mi)
  - Urban: 293.78 km^{2} (113.43 sq mi)
  - Metro: 3,964.95 km^{2} (1,530.88 sq mi)
  - Rank: 1st
- Elevation: 13 m (43 ft)
- Highest elevation: 2,909 m (9,544 ft)
- Lowest elevation: 0 m (0 ft)

Population (2024 census)
  - Highly urbanized city: 1,848,947
  - Rank: 3rd
  - Density: 756.646/km^{2} (1,959.70/sq mi)
  - Urban: 1,232,958
  - Metro: 1,991,457
  - Metro density: 502.265/km^{2} (1,300.86/sq mi)
  - Households: 476,278
- Demonyms: Dabawenyo, (Cebuano); davaeño -a, davaense (Spanish)

Economy
  - Gross domestic product (GDP): ₱595.7 billion (2023) $10.7 billion (2024)
  - Income class: 1st city income class
  - HDI: ▲0.834 (Very High)
  - Poverty incidence: 7.7% (2023)
  - Revenue: ₱ 17,561 million (2024)
  - Assets: ₱ 37,259 million (2024)
  - Expenditure: ₱ 10,988 million (2024)
  - Liabilities: ₱ 8,818 million (2024)

Service provider
  - Electricity: Davao Light and Power Company (DLPC)
  - Water: Davao City Water District
  - Telecommunications: Converge ICT; Dito Telecommunity; Globe Telecom; PLDT
  - Cable TV: Sky Cable
- Time zone: UTC+8 (PST)
- ZIP code: 8000 (Davao City); 8016 (Ateneo de Davao University); 8017 (Bunawan); 8018 (Calinan); 8019 (Davao International Airport); 8020 (Mandug); 8021 (Matina); 8022 (Mintal); 8023 (Talomo); 8024 (Tibungco); 8025 (Toril); 8026 (University of Mindanao)
- PSGC: 112402000
- IDD : area code: +63 (0)82
- Spoken languages: Cebuano; Bislish Language; English
- Website: www.davaocity.gov.ph

Davao City, officially the City of Davao, (Note: Cebuano: Dakbayan sa Davao; Central Bikol: Syudad nin Davao; Hiligaynon: Dakbanwa sang Davao; Matigsalug Manobo: Siyudad ne Davah; Tagabawa: Siyudad ka Dabo; Giangan: Siyudad neng Dawwow; Maranao: Bandar a Dabaw; Maguindanaon: Kuta nu Dabaw; Ilocano: Siudad ti Davao; Kapampangan: Lakanbalen ning Dabo; Pangasinan: Siyudad na Davao; Tagalog: Lungsod ng Dabaw; Waray: Syudad han Davao; Spanish: Ciudad de Dávao) is a highly urbanized city in the Davao Region, Philippines. The city has a total land area of 2,443.61 km^{2} (943.48 sq mi), making it the largest city in the Philippines in terms of land area. It is the third-most-populous city in the Philippines after Quezon City and Manila respectively, and the most populous city in Mindanao, in Davao Region, and outside of Metro Manila. According to the 2024 census, it has a population of 1,848,947 people.

It is the largest city in the province of Davao del Sur both in population and land area wherein it is geographically situated and grouped under the province by the Philippine Statistics Authority, but the city is governed and administered independently from it. The city is divided into three congressional districts, which are subdivided into 11 administrative districts with a total of 182 barangays.

Davao City is the regional center of Davao Region and also the center of Metro Davao, the second-most-populous metropolitan area in the Philippines. The city serves as the main trade, commerce and industry hub of Mindanao, and the regional center of Davao Region. The region of Davao is home to Mount Apo, the highest mountain in the Philippines, which is highly visible in most parts of Davao City. The city is also nicknamed the "Durian Capital of the Philippines".

== Etymology ==
The region's name is derived from its Bagobo origins, who are indigenous to the area. The word davao came from the phonetic blending of three Bagobo subgroups' names for the Davao River, a major waterway emptying into Davao Gulf near the city. The Obos, who inhabit the hinterlands of the region, called the river Davah (with a gentle vowel ending, although later pronunciation is with a hard v or b); the Clatta (or Giangan/Diangan) called it Dawaw, and the Tagabawas called it Dabo. To the Obos, davah also means "a place beyond the high grounds" (alluding to settlements at the mouth of the river surrounded by high, rolling hills).

== History ==
=== Precolonial era ===
The area of what is now Davao City was once a lush forest inhabited by Lumadic peoples such as the Bagobos and Matigsalugs, alongside other ethnic groups such as the Aeta, Maguindanaon and the Kagan. Davao River was then called Tagloc River by the Bagobos, Maguindanaons and Tausugs who then inhabited a settlement near the mouth of the river to the sea around what is now Bolton Riverside due immediately southwest of the city plaza. In 1543, Spanish explorers led by Ruy Lopez de Villalobos sailing around Mindanao deliberately avoided the area around Davao Gulf, then called Gulf of Tagloc, due to the danger posed by fleets of Moro warships operating in the area while surveying the southeastern coast of Mindanao for possible colonization, and as a result the Davao Gulf area remained virtually untouched by European explorers for the next three centuries.

=== Maguindanao era ===
A Maguindanaon Datu under the name Datu Bago was rewarded the territory of the surroundings of Davao Gulf by the Sultan of Maguindanao Sultanate for joining the campaign against the Spanish in the late 1700s. From his ancestral home in Maguindanao, he moved to the area in 1800 and, having convinced Bagobos and other native groups in the area to his side, conquered the entire Davao Gulf area. Having consolidated his position, he founded the fortress of Pinagurasan in what is now the site of Bangkerohan Public Market in 1830 which served as his capital. From being a fortification and base of operations from which Datu Bago could gather and rally his forces, the settlement of Pinagurasan eventually grew into a small city extending from present-day Generoso Bridge in Bangkerohan to Quezon Boulevard more than a kilometer down south, as Maguindanaons and Bagobos alike among other nearby tribes in the area flocked into the settlement, eventually becoming the main trade entrepot in the Davao Gulf area. With his immense overlordship of Davao Gulf, Datu Bago was eventually crowned Sultan by his subjects at his capital Pinagurasan in 1843, effectively making his realm virtually independent from the Sultanate of Maguindanao, becoming a Sultanate with sovereignty over Davao Gulf in equal standing with the Muslim kingdoms of Maguindanao and Sulu.

=== Spanish era ===
Although the Spaniards began to explore the Davao Gulf area as early as the 16th century, Spanish influence was negligible in the Davao region until 1842, when the Spanish Governor-General of the Philippines Narciso Clavería ordered the colonization of the Davao Gulf region, including what is now Davao City, for the Spanish Crown. This came after the loss of their colonies in the Americas from the 1820s to 1830s which gravely reduced their sources of revenue to the point that the royal government in Madrid could no longer continue to properly provide financial support to what remained of its worldwide colonies. Thus, it became more urgent for local officials in the colonies, including the Philippines, to find ways and means of expanding the revenues in running the colonies, primarily in terms of tribute extracted from the natives. It meant that for the first time, the Spanish colonial government in the Philippines was compelled to embark on a full-scale conquest of Mindanao in the hopes of increasing its coffers.

Davao Gulf seemed to be a tempting target among Spanish military circles based in Manila for its thriving maritime trade taking place there. Their initial forays began with their incursion on the village of Sigaboy in 1842, from which the local Spanish officials who recently landed there immediately demanded heavy tribute on the natives who then asked for Datu Bago's help in expelling the Spaniards, which he responded swiftly by sending a combined naval and land force in the area to defeat and drive out the Spanish force there. The Spanish, seeing Datu Bago as a mere pirate and brigand, did not take the threat seriously for years despite his numerous victories against them until the burning of the Spanish trading vessel San Rufo, which carried a letter of friendship from Sultan Iskandar Qudaratullah Muhammad Zamal al-Azam of Maguindanao to Governor-General Claveria, and its massacre of all its crew by seaborne corsairs under orders from Datu Bago himself in 1846. Incensed with the incident, the Spanish secured the consent from the Sultan of Maguindanao who finally disowned the Moros of Davao Gulf by using the incident as pretext for justification to conquer the area. Thus, the official Spanish colonization of Davao Gulf finally began in earnest in April 1848 when an expedition of 70 men and women led by José Cruz de Oyanguren of Vergara, Spain, landed on the estuary of the Davao River the same month, intent on conquering Pinagurasan, the capital of Datu Bago's domain, in the hopes of permanently ending the menace posed on Spanish vessels by Moro raiders in Davao Gulf.

Being the strongest chieftain in the region, Datu Bago imposed heavy tribute on the Mandaya tribes nearby, therefore also making him the most loathed chieftain in the region. Cruz de Uyanguren had orders from the higher authorities in Manila to colonize the Davao Gulf region, which included the Bagobo settlement on the northern riverbank; in return, he asked for the position of the governor of the conquered area and the monopoly of its commerce for ten years. At this juncture, a Mandaya chieftain named Datu Daupan, who then ruled Samal Island, came to him, seeking for an alliance against Datu Bago. The two chieftains were archrivals, and Cruz de Uyanguren took advantage of it, initiating an alliance between Spain and the Mandayas of Samal Island. Intent on taking the settlement for Spain, he and his men accordingly assaulted it, but the Bagobo natives fiercely resisted the attacks, which resulted in his Samal Mandaya allies to desert. Thus, a three-month-long inconclusive battle for the possession of the settlement ensued which was only decided when an infantry company which sailed its way by warships from Zamboanga came in as reinforcements, thus ensuring the takeover of the settlement and its surroundings by the Spaniards while the defeated Bagobos fled further inland while Datu Bago and his followers fled north to Hijo where he would die two years later.

After Cruz de Oyanguren defeated Bago and conquered Pinagurasan, he founded the town of Nueva Vergara, the future Davao, in the mangrove swamps of what is now Bolton Riverside on June 29, 1848, in honor of his home in Spain and became its first governor. Pinagurasan was then incorporated into the new town. Almost two years later on February 29, 1850, the province of Nueva Guipúzcoa was established via a royal decree, with the newly founded town as the capital, once again to honor his homeland in Spain. When he was the governor of the province, however, his plans of fostering a positive economic sway on the region backfired, which resulted in his eventual replacement under orders of the colonial government.

The province of Nueva Guipuzcoa was dissolved on July 30, 1860, as it became the Politico-Military Commandery of Davao. By the clamor of its natives, a petition was given to the Spanish government to rename Nueva Vergara into Davao, the latter being the name used by the natives since its founding. It was eventually accepted in 1867, and Nueva Vergara was given its present name Davao.

The Spanish control of the town was unstable at best, as its Lumad and Moro natives routinely resisted the attempts of the Spanish authorities to forcibly resettle them and convert them into Christianity. Despite all these, such were all done with the goal of making the governance of the area easier, dividing the Christians—both settlers and native converts—and the Muslim Moros into several religion-based communities within the town.

=== During the Philippine Revolution ===
As the Philippine Revolution, having been fought for two years, neared its end in 1898, the expected departure of the Spanish authorities in Davao became apparent, although they took no part in the war at all, owing to the lack of revolutionary figures in the area save for a negligible pro-Filipino separatist rebel movement in the town of Santa Cruz in the south. When the war finally ended, as the Spanish authorities finally left the town, two Davaoeño locals by the names of Pedro Layog and Jose M. Lerma represented the town and the region at the Malolos Congress of 1898, therefore indicating Davao as a part of the nascent First Philippine Republic.

The period of Filipino revolutionary control of Davao did not last long, however, as the Americans landed at the town later the same year. There was no record of locals offering any sort of resistance to the Americans.

=== American period ===
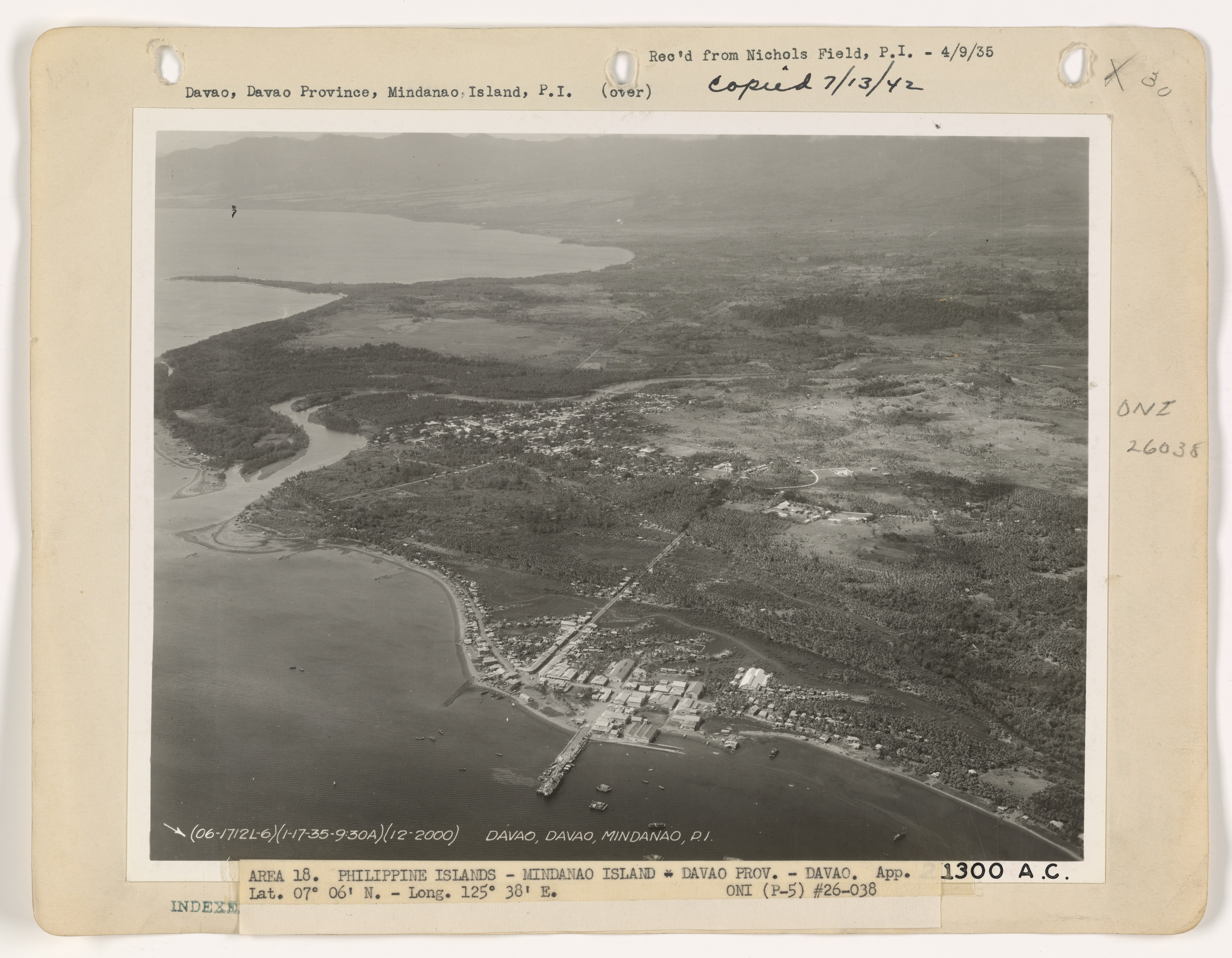
Aerial view of Davao, 1935

As the Americans began their administration of the town in 1900, economic opportunities quickly arose as huge swathes of its areas, mainly lush forests and fertile grasslands, were declared open for agricultural investment. As a result, foreign businessmen, especially Japanese entrepreneurs, started settling the region, staking their claims on the vast lands of Davao and turning them into huge coconut and banana plantations. In just a short period, Davao changed from a small and sparsely inhabited town into a bustling economic center serving the Davao Gulf region, heavily populated alongside natives by tens of thousands of settlers and economic migrants from Luzon, Visayas and Japan. The Port of Davao was established and opened the same year to facilitate the international export of agricultural products from Davao.

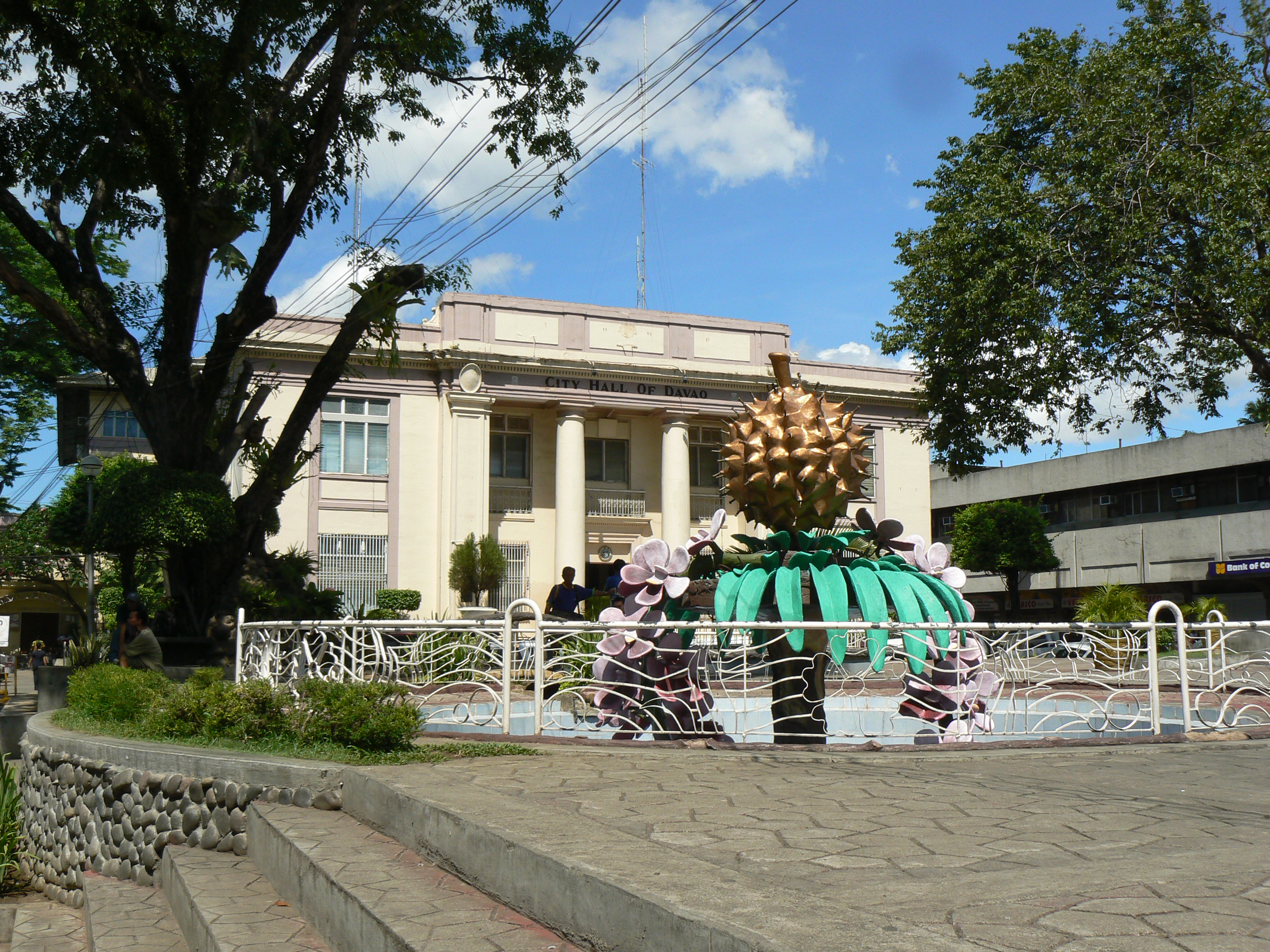
Davao City Hall was established in 1926 as the Municipal Hall when it was still a town.

Davao was incorporated as a part of Moro Province from 1903 to 1914. When the province was dissolved in 1914, it led to the establishment of Davao Province, with Davao as its provincial capital. What is now the city's Legislative Council Building served as the provincial capitol. It was built in 1926, the same year the Davao Municipal Hall, now the City Hall, was constructed.

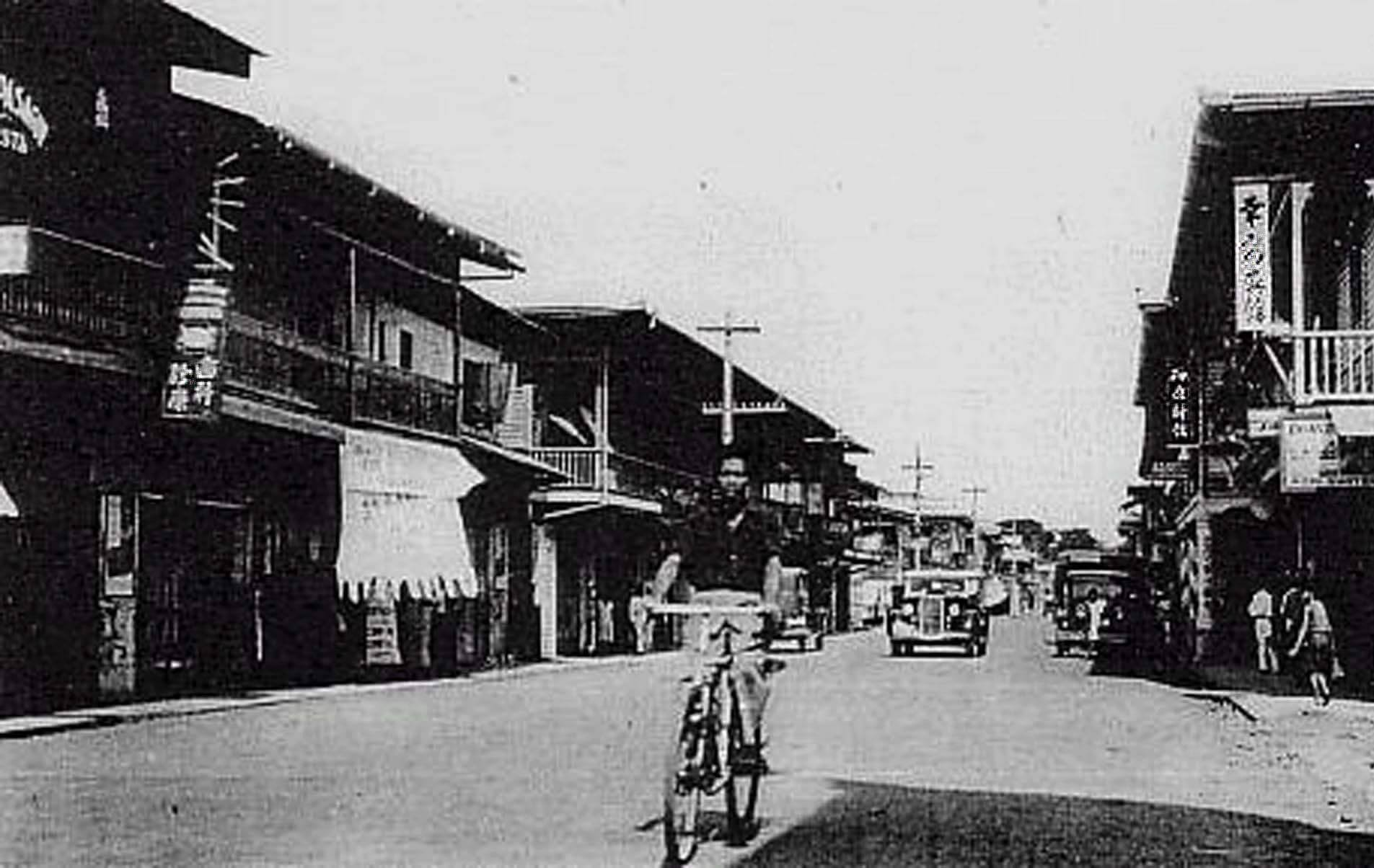
Japan-town, Davao City (circa 1930s)

Because of the rapidly increasing progress of the town, on March 16, 1936, congressman Romualdo Quimpo from Davao filed Bill 609 (passed as Commonwealth Act 51), creating the City of Davao from the town of Davao and the municipal district of Guianga. The bill called for the appointment of local officials by the president. By that time, the new city was already mostly populated with Japanese businessmen and settlers who then became its locals. Davao was inaugurated as a charter city on October 16, 1936, by President Manuel L. Quezon; the charter came into effect on March 1, 1937. It was one of the first two towns in Mindanao to be converted into a city, the other being Zamboanga.

==== Second World War ====
On December 8, 1941, Japanese planes bombed the harbor, and from December 20 they landed forces and began an occupation of the city which lasted until 1945. Davao was among the earliest to be occupied by Japanese forces, and the city was immediately fortified as a bastion of Japanese defense. Under the brutal Japanese regime, girls, teenagers and young adults were kidnapped by Japanese soldiers and were forced into becoming sex slaves under the oppressive "comfort women" system, where the victims were routinely gang-raped and killed. Korean and Taiwanese nationals were also brought by the Japanese to Davao and were forced into becoming sex slaves.

The city was subjected to extensive bombing by forces led by Douglas MacArthur before American forces landed in Leyte in October 1944. The Battle of Davao towards the end of World War II was one of the longest and bloodiest battles during the Philippine Liberation, and brought tremendous destruction to the city, setting back the economic and physical strides made before the Japanese occupation.

=== Postwar growth ===
Old seal of the city, NHCP version

Davao regained its status as the agricultural and economic hub of Mindanao after the war ended in 1945. Wood products such as plywood and timber, and more agricultural products being produced within the city, such as copra and other varieties of banana, became available for export. Some Japanese locals—80% percent of the city's population prior to the war's end—assimilated with the Filipino population, while others were expelled from the country by the Filipino locals, due to recent enmity.

Davao was peaceful and increasingly progressive in the postwar period, including the 1950s and the mid-1960s. Ethnic tensions were minimal, and there was essentially no presence of secessionists groups in Mindanao.

In 1967, the Province of Davao was divided into three provinces: Davao del Norte, Davao Oriental and Davao del Sur. The city of Davao became part of Davao del Sur; no longer the provincial capital, it became a commercial center of southern Mindanao. This period also saw the first ever election of an indigenous person to the office of Mayor of Davao City, when Elias Lopez, a full-blooded Bagobo, won the mayoral elections of 1967.

=== Social unrest, martial law and the 1980s ===
By the late 1960s, Davao had become the regional capital of southern Mindanao; with the reorganization, it became the regional capital of the Davao Region (Region XI) and a highly urbanized city in the province of Davao del Sur.

Things began to take a turn for the worse late into Ferdinand Marcos's first presidential term, when news about the Jabidah massacre ignited a furor in the Moro community, and ethnic tensions encouraged with the formation of secessionist movements. An economic crisis in late 1969 led to social unrest, and violent crackdowns on protests led to the radicalization of many students throughout the country. With no way to express their grievances about government abuses after the declaration of martial law in 1972, many of them joined the New People's Army (NPA), bringing the Communist rebellion in the Philippines to Davao and the rest of Mindanao for the first time. The movement would continue to grow over the next decade, but was continuing to struggle by the early 1980s, convincing prominent party thinker and idealogue Edgar Jopson to be based there, until he was killed after a raid in Skyline Subdivision in September 1982.

The years immediately after Jopson's death saw an unmanageable increase in the Communist Party's ranks, however. The 1983 Philippine economic nosedive and the Assassination of Ninoy Aquino a few months later saw the New People's Army grow to seven fronts (Battalion sized units), which coincided with a decision to experiment with strategies like urban insurrectionism. Severe violence began with assassinations of corrupt officials and policemen, but mid-1984 and August 1985 saw 16 journalists killed where only six had been killed in the decade between 1975 and 1984. Agdao, the poor Barangay from which of the NPA got much of its support, began to be known as "Nicaragdao." Foreign press began labelling Davao the Philippines' "Murder Capital" and "Killing Fields," while the NPA's experiments with urban insurrectionism led all of Mindanao to be labeled "the laboratory of the revolution." In order to keep its large number of cadres supplied, the NPA depended heavily on local citizens for supplies, increasing the incidences of abusive behavior, and reducing support for their cause.

In 1984, rightwing vigilantes with the support of Philippine Constabulary Davao City Metropolitan Command commander Lt. Colonel Franco Calida, formed the armed group "Alsa Masa" (People's Rise) to counter them. Their presence, coinciding infighting within the NPA triggered by a hunt for deep penetration agents, was perceived as reducing NPA presence in Davao, but at the cost of the Alsa Masa itself committing human rights violations.

Most Davao residents remained staunchly against violence from either extreme. Early examples had included the Roman Catholic Archbishop of Davao Antonio L. Mabutas, who was among the first religious leaders to peacefully speak out against the Human rights abuses of the Marcos dictatorship. However, these peaceful citizens lacked the political clout to influence the situation much before 1983. One stabilizing element was the designation of then-Colonel Rodolfo Biazon as commander of the 3rd Marine Brigade assigned to Davao. In what the international press dubbed "the most sophisticated approach" to addressing the insurgency, Biazon eschewed the aggressive stance preferred by the Philippine Constabulary and instead focused on outreach and community engagement—visiting schools and communities, and assuring the public that any Marine would be disciplined for any abuses committed.

Ordinary citizens began to have more of a voice for change after the economic crisis of 1983, the assassination of Ninoy Aquino, and the murder of prominent Davao City journalist Alex Orcullo at a checkpoint in Barangay Tigatto on October 19, 1984. These seminal events prompted prominent city figures like Soledad Duterte to organize a protest group called the "Yellow Friday Movement", which slowly gained support until 1986, when Marcos was finally ousted and forced into exile.

From various sectors such as the academe, there were other ordinary

Numerous Davaoeños from various sectors of society are honored at the Philippines' Bantayog ng mga Bayani, which honors the martyrs and heroes which fought for democracy against the authoritarian regime. This includes:

- Fernando "Nanding" Esperon, a youth organizer who, as chair of Liga sa Kabatan-onan sa Davao (LIKADA) was investigating five extrajudicial killings attributed to the Alsa Masa, when he was accosted from a jeepney he was riding, shot in both knees, captured, and then found dead soon after having been riddled with bullets and then thrown off the Lizada Bridge over the Toril river.
- Atty Laurente "Larry" Ilagan, an alumnus of the Ateneo de Davao Law School who became a prominent Human Rights Lawyer with the Free Legal Assistance Group;
- Eduardo Lanzona, an Economics Professor and Union Organizer who was arrested in Davao Del Norte and eventually killed by Marcos' forces in 1975;
- Activist Maria Socorro Par who pushed for the restoration of the student council and school paper Atenews in the mid70s after they had been shut down in Martial Law,
- Atenews Editor in Chief Evella Bontia;
- Law School alumnus Nicolas Solana Jr.,
- ADDU High School alumnus Ricky Filio and Joel Jose.

=== After the People Power revolution ===
Because the local leaders of the time were closely associated with Marcos, they were removed by the 1986 revolutionary government which took power after Marcos's ouster. President Corazon Aquino then appointed Soledad Duterte's son, Rodrigo Duterte, as temporary Vice Mayor of Davao. Rodrigo Duterte later ran for Mayor of Davao City and won, taking the top city office from 1988 to 1998, from 2001 to 2010, and yet again from 2013 to 2016, after which he became President of the Philippines.

== Geography ==
Davao City is approximately 946 kilometers (588 mi) southeast of Manila over land, and 971 kilometers (524 nmi) by sea. The city is located in southeastern Mindanao, on the northwestern shore of Davao Gulf, opposite Samal Island. Mount Apo and Mount Talomo can be seen from here.

=== Barangay ===
Davao City politically subdivided into 11 districts and 182 barangays. Each barangay consists of puroks while some have sitios.

=== Topography ===
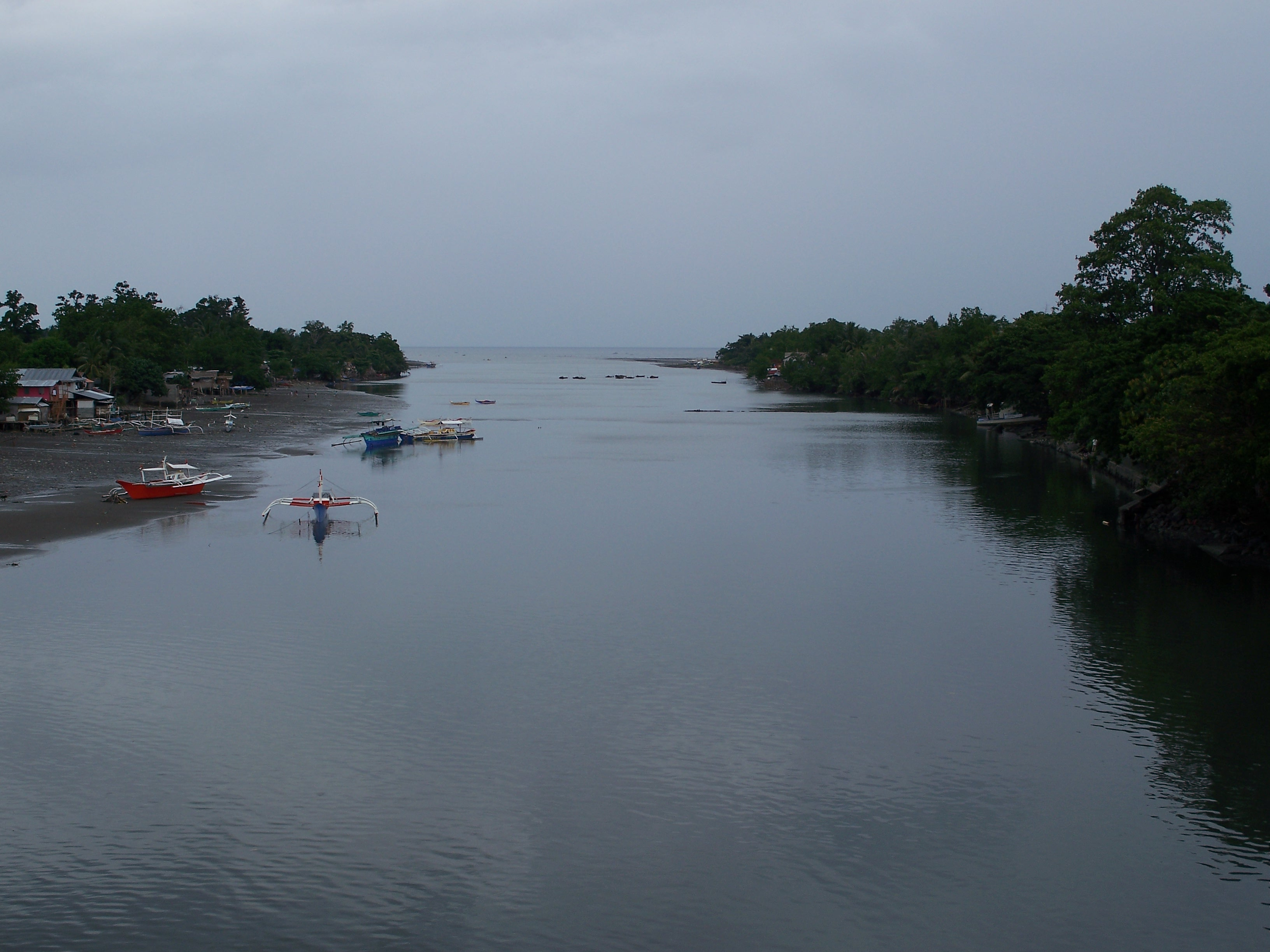
Mouth of the Davao River in Talomo District

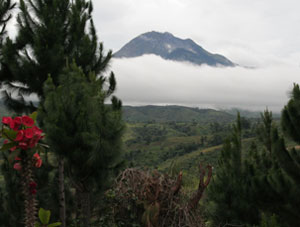
Mount Apo is the tallest mountain in the Philippines.

Davao City's land, totaling about 2,443.61 km^{2} (943.48 sq mi), is hilly in the west (the Marilog district) and slopes down to the southeastern shore. Mount Apo, the highest peak in the Philippines, is located at the city's southwestern tip. Mount Apo National Park (the mountain and its surrounding vicinity), was inaugurated by President Manuel L. Quezon (in Proclamation 59 of May 8, 1936) to protect the flora and fauna of the surrounding mountain range.

The Davao River is the city's primary drainage channel. Draining an area of over 1,700 km^{2} (660 sq mi), the 160-kilometer (99 mi) river begins in the town of San Fernando, Bukidnon. The mouth of the river is located at Barangay Bucana at Talomo District.

=== Climate ===
Davao has a tropical rainforest climate (Köppen climate classification Af), with little seasonal variation in temperature. The areological mechanism of the Intertropical Convergence Zone occurs more often than that of the trade winds and because it experiences rare cyclones the climate is not purely equatorial but subequatorial. Average monthly temperatures are always above 26 °C (78.8 °F), and average monthly rainfall is above 77 millimeters (3.03 in). This gives the city a tropical climate, without a true dry season; while there is significant rainfall in winter, the largest rainfall occurs during the summer months (see climate chart, below).

Climate data for Davao City (1991–2020, extremes 1903–present)
Month	Jan	Feb	Mar	Apr	May	Jun	Jul	Aug	Sep	Oct	Nov	Dec	Year
Record high °C (°F)	35.0 (95.0)	36.7 (98.1)	36.7 (98.1)	37.0 (98.6)	37.3 (99.1)	35.2 (95.4)	36.0 (96.8)	36.0 (96.8)	35.1 (95.2)	36.2 (97.2)	36.2 (97.2)	35.0 (95.0)	37.3 (99.1)
Mean daily maximum °C (°F)	30.9 (87.6)	31.3 (88.3)	32.3 (90.1)	33.1 (91.6)	32.7 (90.9)	32.0 (89.6)	31.7 (89.1)	31.8 (89.2)	32.2 (90.0)	32.6 (90.7)	32.2 (90.0)	31.6 (88.9)	32.0 (89.6)
Daily mean °C (°F)	27.3 (81.1)	27.5 (81.5)	28.2 (82.8)	28.9 (84.0)	28.9 (84.0)	28.4 (83.1)	28.1 (82.6)	28.2 (82.8)	28.3 (82.9)	28.5 (83.3)	28.3 (82.9)	27.9 (82.2)	28.2 (82.8)
Mean daily minimum °C (°F)	24.7 (76.5)	24.7 (76.5)	24.1 (75.4)	24.7 (76.5)	24.0 (75.2)	24.7 (76.5)	24.5 (76.1)	25.5 (77.9)	25.4 (77.7)	25.4 (77.7)	25.4 (77.7)	25.2 (77.4)	25.4 (77.7)
Record low °C (°F)	17.0 (62.6)	16.1 (61.0)	17.4 (63.3)	19.1 (66.4)	20.2 (68.4)	20.3 (68.5)	20.0 (68.0)	18.5 (65.3)	20.0 (68.0)	19.2 (66.6)	19.1 (66.4)	16.2 (61.2)	16.1 (61.0)
Average rainfall mm (inches)	166.8 (6.57)	114.4 (4.50)	106.6 (4.20)	114.6 (4.51)	166.2 (6.54)	192.7 (7.59)	168.6 (6.64)	167.4 (6.59)	162.0 (6.38)	194.8 (7.67)	139.7 (5.50)	141.7 (5.58)	1,835.5 (72.26)
Average rainy days (≥ 1 mm)	11	9	9	9	13	14	13	12	11	12	12	11	136
Average relative humidity (%)	82	80	78	77	80	82	82	81	81	81	81	81	81
Mean monthly sunshine hours	213.9	222.2	262.8	262.4	246.6	218.1	221.3	237.9	229.2	236.2	220.4	225.0	2,796
Source 1: PAGASA
Source 2: Weather.Directory

=== Flora and fauna ===
Mount Apo is home to many bird species, 111 of which are endemic to the area. It is also home to one of the world's largest eagles, the critically endangered Philippine eagle, the country's national bird. The Philippine Eagle Foundation is based near the city. Plant species include the orchid waling-waling, also known as the "Queen of Philippine Flowers" as well as one of the country's national flowers, which are also endemic to the area. Fruits such as mangosteen (known as the "queen of fruits") and durian (known as the "king of fruits"), grow abundantly on Mount Apo.

=== Geology ===
Despite Davao City's location in the Asian portion of the Pacific Ring of Fire, the city has suffered few earthquakes and most have been minor. Mount Apo, 40 km (25 mi) southwest from the city proper, is a dormant volcano.

== Demographics ==
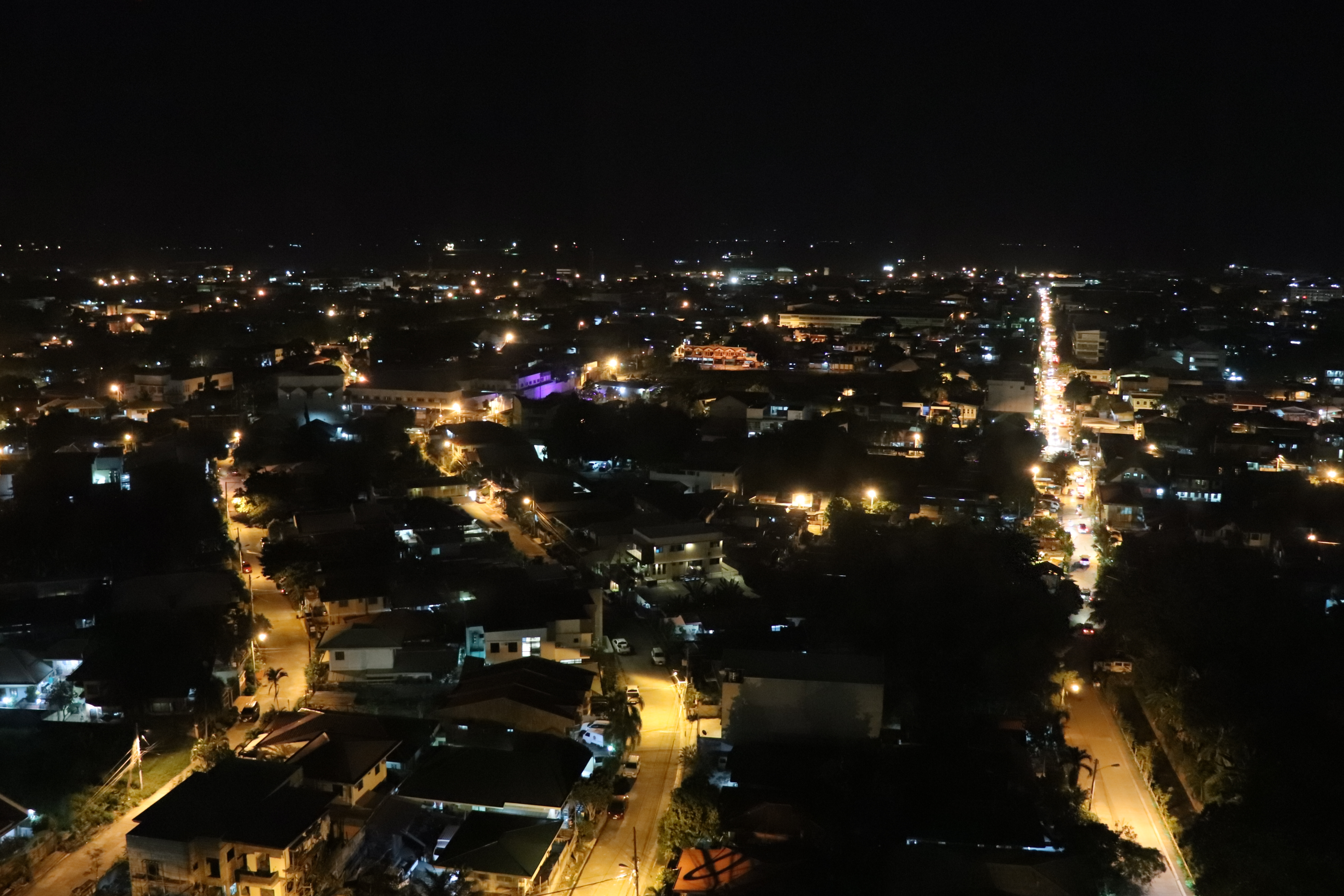
Davao City aerial view at night

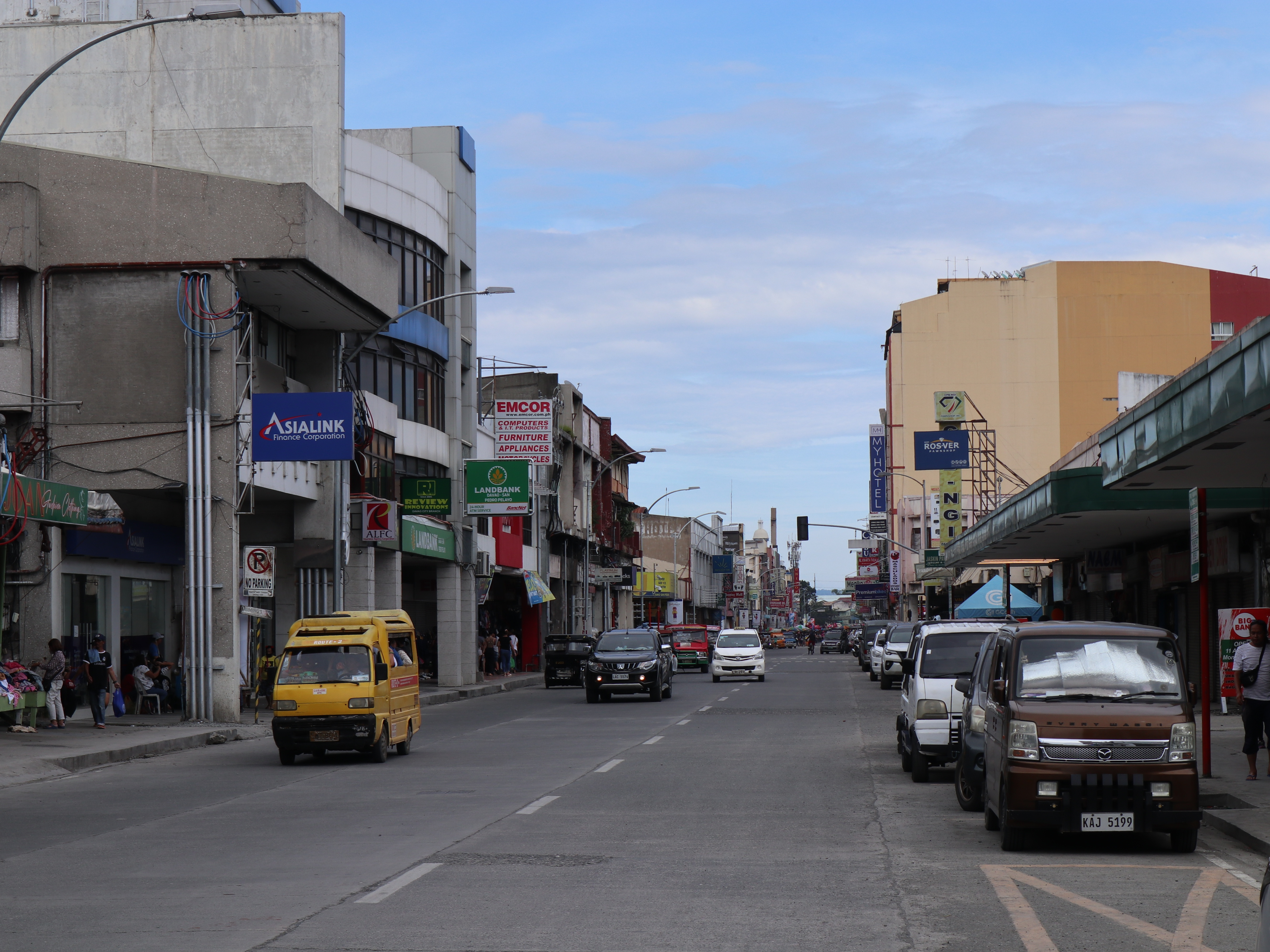
Looking north on San Pedro Street, Davao City

Population census of Davao City

Year	Pop.	±% p.a.
1903	8,560	—
1918	21,538	+6.34%
1939	95,546	+7.35%
1948	111,263	+1.71%
1960	225,712	+6.07%
1970	392,473	+5.68%

Year	Pop.	±% p.a.
1975	484,678	+4.32%
1980	610,375	+4.72%
1990	849,947	+3.37%
1995	1,006,840	+3.22%
2000	1,147,116	+2.84%
2007	1,366,153	+2.44%

Year	Pop.	±% p.a.
2010	1,449,296	+2.17%
2015	1,632,991	+2.30%
2020	1,776,949	+1.79%
2024	1,848,947	+0.96%

Source: Philippine Statistics Authority

As of the 2024 census, the city has a total population of 1,848,947 people. Metro Davao, with the city as its center, had about 2.77 million inhabitants in 2015, making it the third-most-populous metropolitan area in the Philippines and the most-populous city in Mindanao. In the 1995 census, the city's population reached 1,006,840 inhabitants, becoming the first city in the Philippines outside Metro Manila and the fourth nationwide to exceed one million inhabitants. The city's population increase during the 20th century was due to massive immigration waves coming from other parts of the nation and the trend continues to this day.

=== Ethnicities ===
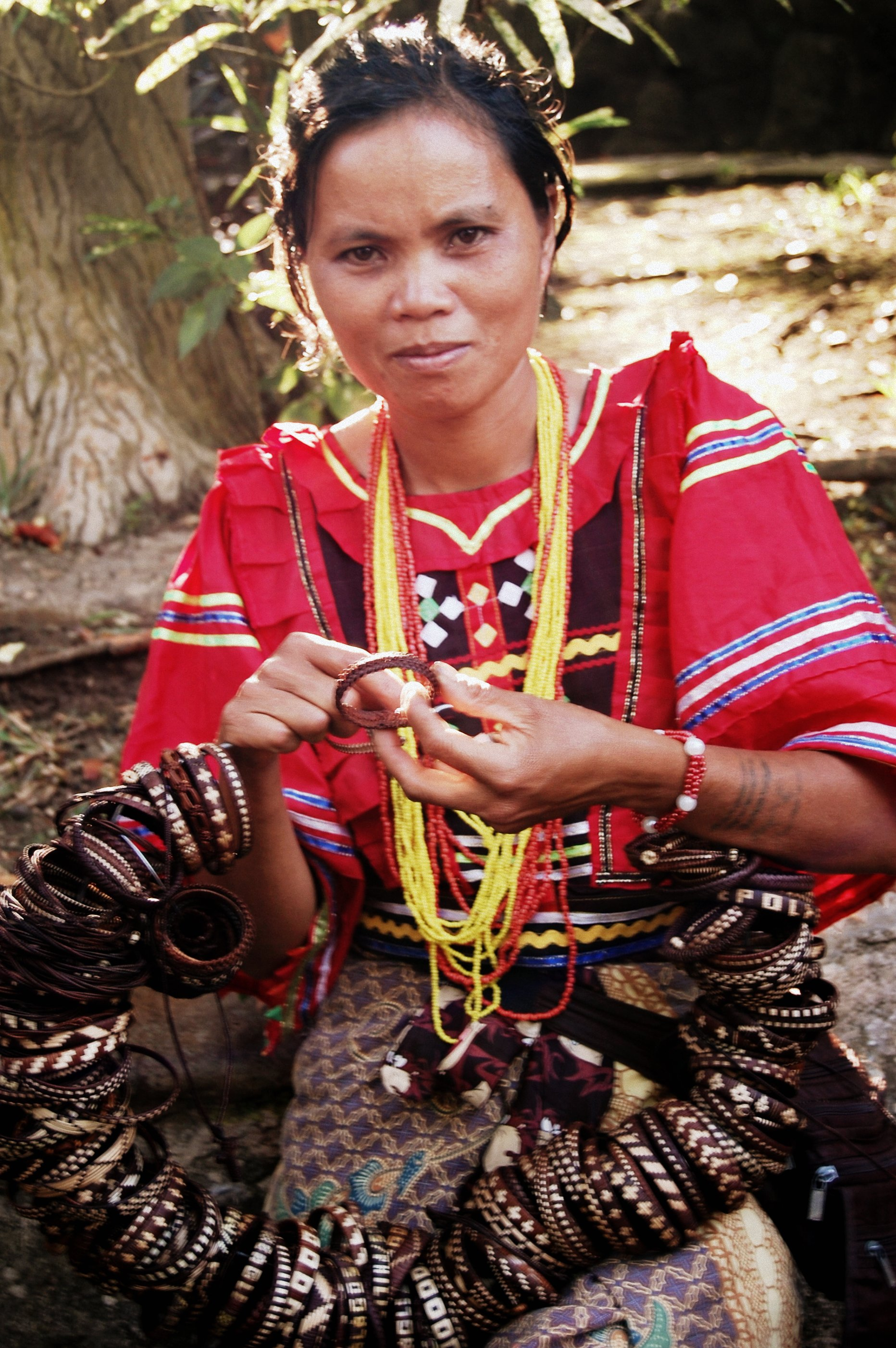
A Matigsalug woman from Davao

Residents of Davao City and the whole corresponding Davao Region are colloquially known as Davaoeños. Nearly all local Davaoeños, mostly descended from migrant settlers from Visayas and sometimes Luzon in recent centuries and decades, are Visayans (an overwhelming majority are Cebuanos, with the rest being Ilonggos (Hiligaynon speakers)) and the respective mestizos from those groups, while others of different ethnicities—especially the indigenous people, who are collectively categorized as Lumads—make up the remainder of the local population. The Davao City residents of non-Visayan ethnicity are mostly Tagalogs, Kapampangans, Ilocanos and their respective mestizos from those groups, which are also descendants of migrant settlers from Luzon, particularly Metro Manila, Central Luzon, Calabarzon, Ilocos Region, the Cordillera Administrative Region and Cagayan Valley. The Moro ethnic groups of the city include the Maguindanaons, Sangils, Kalagans, Maranaos, Iranuns, Tausugs and Sama-Bajaus. There are also historical and recent migrant Chinese Filipinos and Japanese Filipinos coming from other parts of the Philippines that have made sizable communities in Davao. Modern more recent migrants also include Indonesians, Malaysians, Chinese people (both from China and Taiwan), Japanese people and Koreans, that have recently settled and made small communities in Davao City. Non-Asian foreigners, such as Americans and Europeans, are also present in the city in small numbers.

=== Languages ===
Cebuano is the most widely spoken language in the city and its satellite cities and towns, while Filipino (Tagalog) is the formal medium of instruction in schools and is widely understood by residents, who often use it in varying professional fields. Aside from the aforementioned languages, Chavacano Davaoeño and Hiligaynon are also spoken by a minority in addition to languages indigenous to the city, such as Giangan, Kalagan, Tagabawa, Matigsalug, Ata Manobo and Obo. Other languages varyingly spoken as well in the city include Maguindanao, Maranao, Sangil, Sama–Bajaw, Iranun, Tausug, Ilocano and Kapampangan. Philippine Hokkien and Japanese can also be heard privately spoken by Chinese Filipinos and Japanese Filipinos among their fellows in Davao, whereas Mandarin (Standard Chinese) and Japanese is also taught in Chinese class and Japanese class of Chinese Filipino schools and Japanese Nikkei Filipino schools.

A linguistic phenomenon has developed in the city whereby locals significantly mix Tagalog terms and grammar into their Cebuano Bisaya speech because of varying reasons such as, the normalcy of the older generations of Cebuano-speaking families speaking Tagalog to their children at home, some migrant settlers to the city are also from Luzon where Tagalog is mainstream, and the modern Filipino mass media is also mostly in Filipino (Tagalog) and Filipino class is also taught in schools in Davao, while Cebuano is spoken in other everyday settings, making Tagalog a secondary casual lingua franca.

=== Religion ===
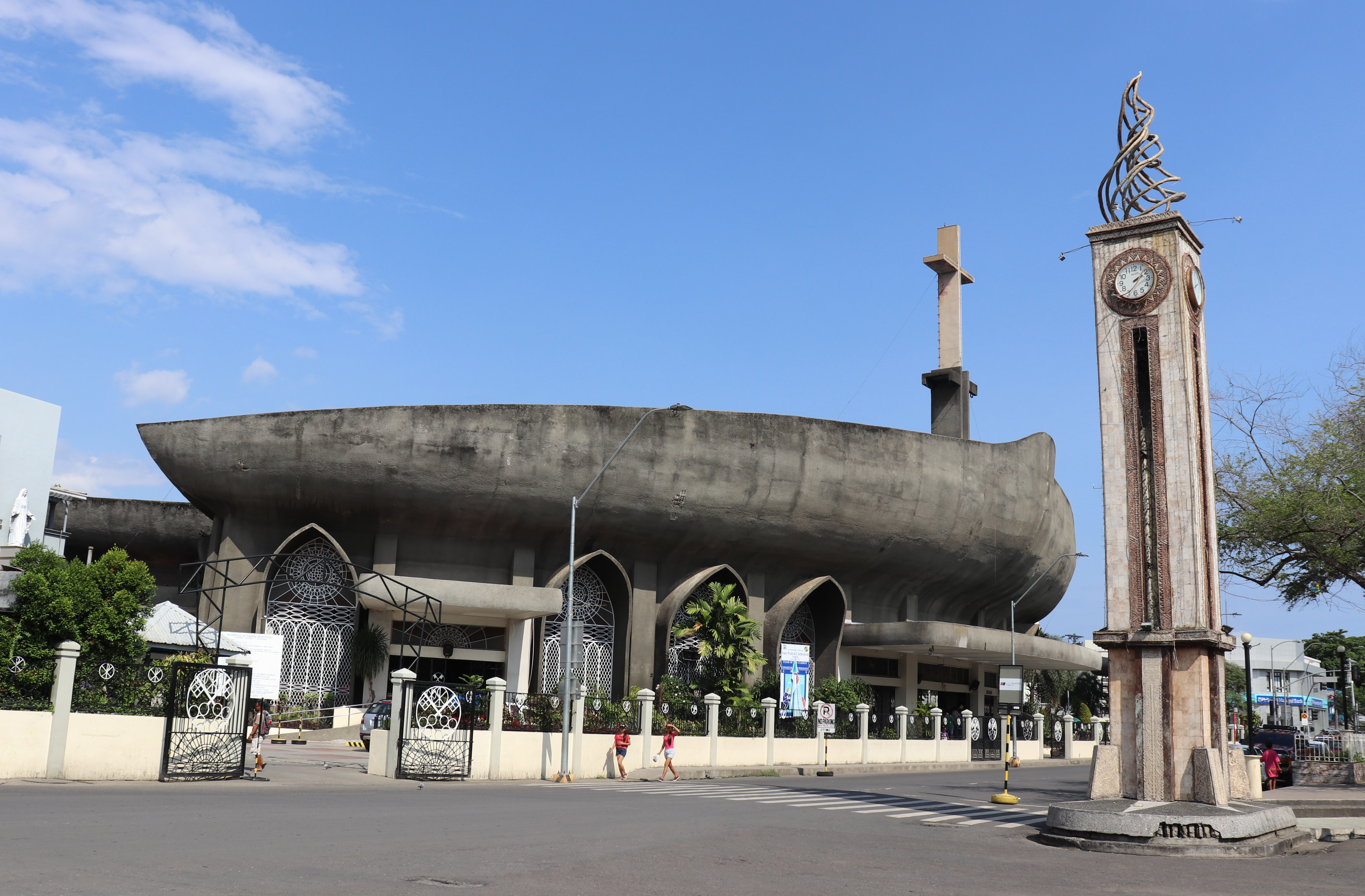
The city's San Pedro Cathedral

The majority of Davao City's inhabitants are Roman Catholic Christians, forming 78% of the population. The next largest religious affiliation is Islam at 4%. Other Christian groups, such as the Iglesia ni Cristo, Jesus Miracle Crusade, Pentecostal Missionary Church of Christ (4th Watch) and Kingdom of Jesus Christ, form eighteen percent of the city's religious background. The Seventh-day Adventist Church, the United Church of Christ in the Philippines, the Philippine Independent Church and the Baptists constitute the city's other Christian denominations. Some of the other faiths of the city are Sikhism, Hinduism, Buddhism, Judaism, animism and irreligion.

The Restorationist Church Kingdom of Jesus Christ had its origins in the city. Apollo Quiboloy, who claims to be the "Appointed Son of God", is the leader of the movement.

The Roman Catholic Archdiocese of Davao is the main metropolitan see of the Roman Catholic Church in southern Mindanao. It comprises the city of Davao, the Island Garden City of Samal and the municipality of Talaingod in Davao del Norte province; under its jurisdiction are the three suffragan dioceses of Digos, Tagum and Mati (the capital cities of the three Davao provinces). Archbishop Romulo Valles of the Archdiocese of Davao, appointed on February 11, 2012, by Pope Benedict XVI, took office on May 22, 2012, at San Pedro Cathedral. Saint Peter, locally known as San Pedro, is the patron saint of the city.

== Economy ==
Poverty incidence of Davao City (%)

Source: Philippine Statistics Authority

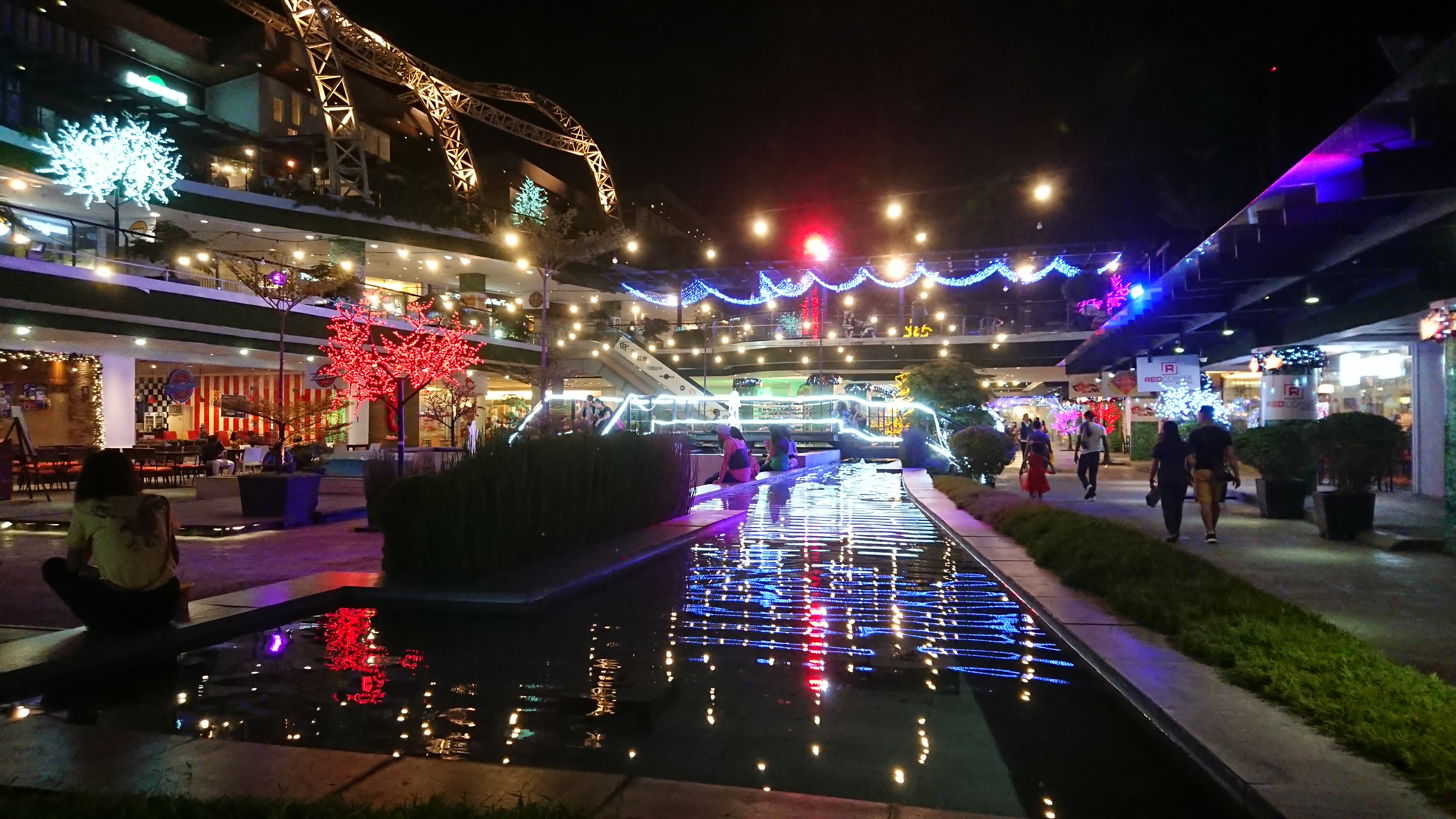
The Peak, Gaisano Mall

Davao is part of the East Asian Growth Area, a regional economic-cooperation initiative in Southeast Asia.

According to the foundation, the city has a projected average annual growth of 2.53 percent over a 15-year period; Davao was the only Philippine city to reach the top 100. As the largest city economy in Mindanao, Davao City also serves as the largest local economy in southern Philippines.

=== Industry ===
Agriculture remains the largest economic sector comprising banana, pineapple, coffee and coconut plantations in the city. It is the island's leading exporter of fruits such as mangoes, pomeloes, bananas, coconut products, pineapples, papayas, mangosteens and cacao.

The chocolate industry is the newest development in the city. Malagos Chocolate, developed here by Malagos Agriventures Corp., is now the country's leading artisan chocolate recognized worldwide. On the other hand, Seed Core Enterprises is the country's biggest exporter of cacao to Barry Callebaut. Durian which is locally grown and harvested in the city, is also a notable export, although banana is the largest fruit export in the city. Local corporations like Lorenzo Group, Anflo Group, AMS Group, Sarangani Agricultural Corp. and Vizcaya Plantations Inc. have operations and headquarters here. Multinational companies like Dole, Sumifru/Sumitomo and Del Monte have their regional headquarters here also. Davao Gulf provides livelihood for many fishermen. Some of the fish products include yellow fin tuna, brackish water milkfish, mudfish, shrimp and crab. Most of the fish catches are discharged in the fishing port in Barangay Toril, which are then sold in the numerous markets within the city.

The city also serves as the main trade, commerce and industry hub of Mindanao and is also one of the financial hubs of Mindanao. Phoenix Petroleum is a multinational oil company based in Davao City and is the first company in the Philippines-based outside Metro Manila to be in the PSE Composite Index. Several industrial plants such as those of Coca-Cola Bottlers, Phil., Pepsi-Cola Products, Phil., Interbev Phil Inc. and RC Cola Phil., companies are located in the city. There is also a number of fruit packaging-exporting facilities and food manufacturing plants as well as industrial construction plants such as Holcim Philippines, Union Galvasteel Corporation and SteelAsia. The SteelAsia plant is now the largest and most modern steel rolling mill production facility in the country, completed in December 2014 and was purposely built to increase the national steel production and to reduce the construction costs in Mindanao.

=== Commerce ===
SM Lanang Premier, one of the largest SM Supermalls in Mindanao

BDO Network Bank (formerly One Network Bank) is based in Davao City and is the largest rural bank in the Philippines in terms of assets. Most of its branches are located in Mindanao (including 17 locations where it is the only financial-services provider). Government social-insurance agencies such as the Social Security System and Government Service Insurance System also have locations in the city. There are several commercial areas in the city: the city's downtown area, also known as the city centre, Davao Chinatown (Uyanguren), Bajada, Lanang, Matina, Ecoland, Agdao, Buhangin, Tibungco, Toril, Mintal and Calinan, the latter three located at the southwestern part of the city.

There are many shopping centers that dot the city. Notable ones include: Gaisano Mall of Davao, which opened in April 1997, is the largest Gaisano Mall in the Philippines, Abreeza, which opened on May 12, 2011, is the first and largest Ayala Mall in Mindanao, and SM Lanang Premier which is the first SM Premier Mall in Mindanao and second SM Mall in the city. Other major malls in the city include NCCC Mall of Davao (under reconstruction since 2021 after its 2017 fire) and SM City Ecoland, which is the first SM Mall in the city and in Mindanao among many others. NCCC Mall VP (formerly Victoria Plaza Mall), located on J.P. Laurel Ave., was the oldest shopping mall in the city, established in 1993 and closed in the end of 2025. Felcris Centrale is a mixed use Retail Mall, supermarket, and IT office complex located along Quimpo Boulevard. Gaisano Mall of Toril, which is the second Gaisano Mall under the DSG Sons Group in the city, is a large shopping mall located in Toril District at the southern part of the city. Some minor malls/community malls include Gaisano Grand Tibungco, NCCC Panacan, NCCC Main Uyanguren, Gaisano Grand Calinan, Gaisano Grand Ilustre and Gaisano Grand Toril. New malls have also opened its doors such as Gaisano Grand Citygate Mall, which is the fifth Gaisano Mall in the city under the Gaisano Grand Group, is a large shopping mall located at Buhangin District just a few kilometers north of the downtown area. NCCC Mall Buhangin, is the second NCCC Mall in the city which is also located in Buhangin District just beside Gaisano Grand Mall Buhangin; which is close to the upcoming first uphill condo development Camella Manors Frontera. CityMall Northtown Davao, is the first CityMall in the city which opened its doors to the public last March 30, 2023. It is located in a 1.5-hectare (3.7-acre) lot within the vicinity of Northtown, a 116-hectare (290-acre) residential estate by the Alsons Dev. in Barangay Cabantian, Davao City. Vista Mall Davao, is the first Vista Mall in the city located at Camella Cerritos, Mintal, Davao City. Construction of new shopping malls in the city are currently underway. NCCC Mall Maa is a large shopping mall being constructed at the site of the now defunct NCCC Mall Davao located at the corner of Don Julian Rodriguez Avenue (Maa Road) and Mc Arthur Highway, Matina, Davao City. Sta. Lucia Mall Davao will be the first Sta. Lucia Mall in the Visayas and Mindanao which is currently under construction at Ponte Verde, C.P. Garcia Highway, Brgy. Communal, Davao City just opposite the Davao International Airport. DGT City Center is a mall currently under construction inside the Davao Global Township, a central business district which is being developed by Cebu Landmasters, Inc. in partnership with the Villa Abrille clan.

== Culture and heritage ==
=== Foreign influence ===
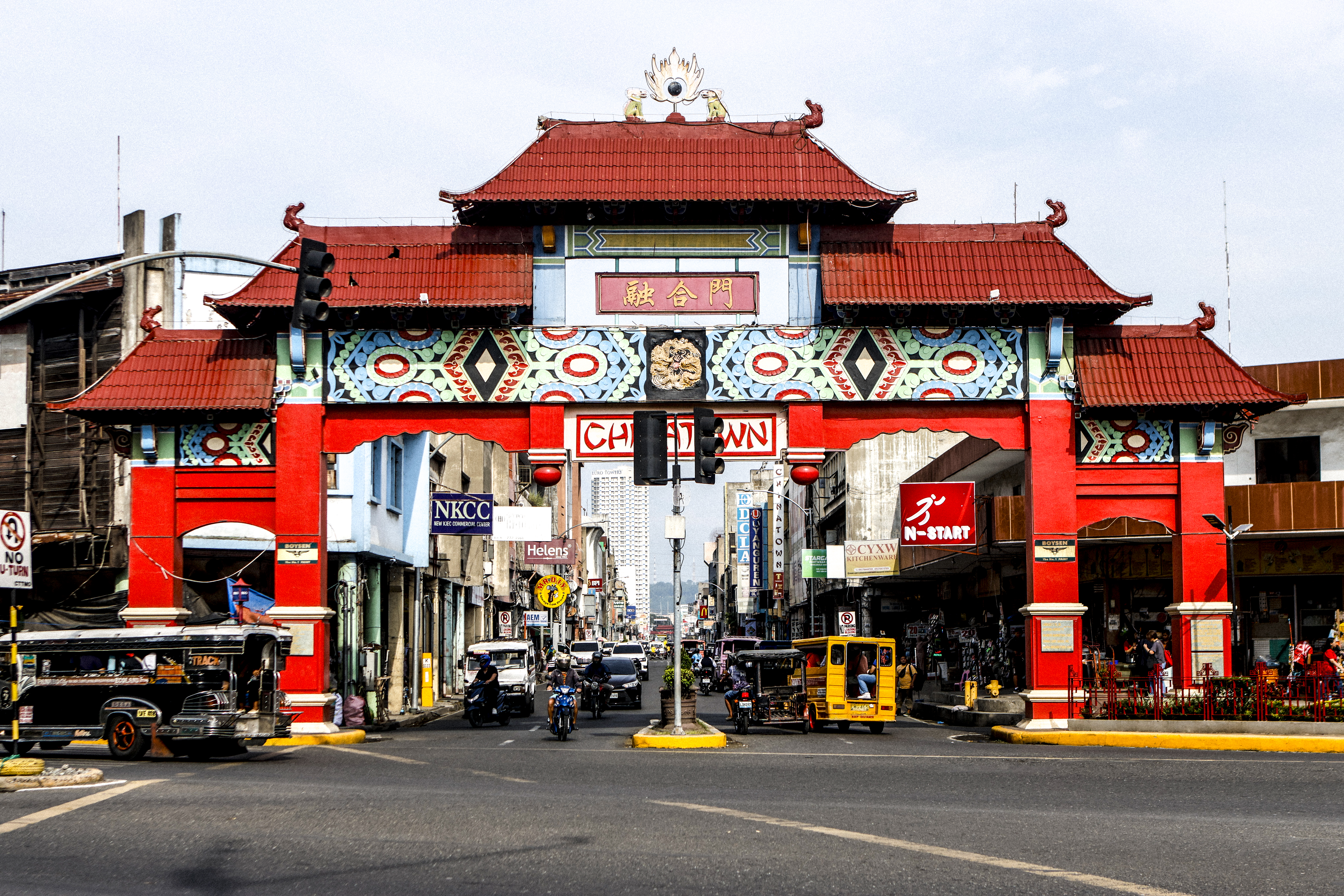
Davao City's Chinatown is said to be the Philippines' biggest in terms of land area.

As with most cities in the Philippines, Christianity is widespread as a result of Spanish colonialism. Christian churches and chapels dot the city's landscape. A small number of temples, mosques and other religions' places of worship may also be found around the city.

A notable tradition brought by the Spanish still celebrated today in Davao City is the celebration of the feast day of each of the barrios (villages) patron saints with a festival (fiesta). These are celebrated through song and dance.

The biggest celebration native to the city is the Kadayawan Festival in early to mid August which, in pre-colonial times was a celebration of the harvest. Today, it serves to commemorate the cultures of the indigenous tribes that inhabit the area surrounding Davao City. Many tribes people visit the city during this time. Festivities include native Mindanaoan street dances, motorcades featuring various clubs and social awareness groups based in the city and art exhibits in various locations featuring local artists and artisans.

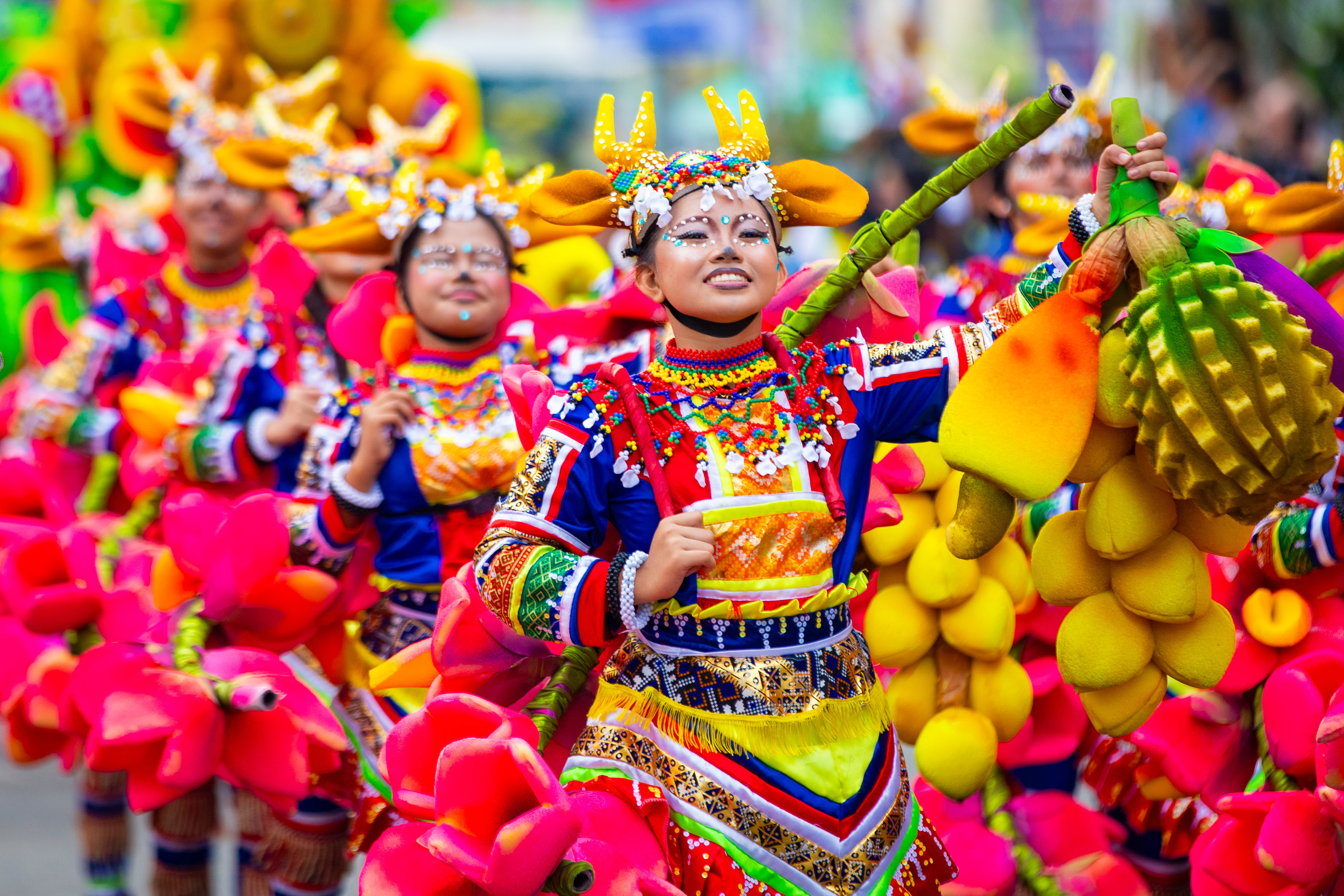
Indak-Indak sa Kadayawan or the Street dancing competition, part of Kadayawan Festival celebration

The Davao Chinatown is the primary residence of the Chinese community in the city. It has its own seaport, the Santa Ana Wharf, which is also a part of Davao International Port.

Japanese cultural influence, like the Chinese, is also prominent in the city. The Japanese community was concentrated in Barangay Mintal in the District of Tugbok, Davao City. In fact, a Japanese cemetery and Japanese shrine is located there. Evidence of Japanese influence are still visible in Mintal. There are various Japanese-owned businesses in the city as well. Davao City is also home to Philippine Nikkei Jin Kai International School, a Japanese-administered educational institution.

Several foreign communities reside in the city, including Indonesians, Malaysians, Koreans and Indians. There are ESL schools for foreigners, and export-oriented industrial parks to entice Japanese and (South) Korean firms to set up shop in the city. However, there has been some cultural conflict over the integration of Koreans in the city, with then-city mayor Rodrigo Duterte complaining about their habit of smoking in public places.

=== Heritage ===
There are a number of cultural-heritage sites in the city, including the Davao Museum (in Insular Village, Lanang), the Mindanao Folk Arts Museum (Philippine Women's College, Juna Subdivision, Matina), Davaoeño Historical Society Museum (at Magallanes and Claveria Streets) and the Philippine-Japan Museum (Matsuo Compound, Calinan). Japanese historical sites include the Japanese Tunnel (used by Japanese forces during World War II), the 20th-century Japanese cemetery (now located inside Mintal Public Cemetery in Brgy. Mintal) and the Furukawa Fiber Plant (used by Yoshizo Furukawa as an abacá and banana plantation).

=== Cuisine ===
The cuisine of Davao City features skewered and grilled meat dishes, but the most common dish served in the city is kinilaw, made from tuna, mackerel, or swordfish with cucumber (and sometimes radishes) and chili marinated in vinegar. Sinuglaw, a portmanteau of sinugba (grilled) and kinilaw in the Cebuano language, is also a term for a dish in which diced, grilled pork belly is mixed with kinilaw.

Fruit dishes, snacks and desserts are also popular, most made from durian and bananas. Durian also made appearance on Davao's culinary scene.

== Tourism ==
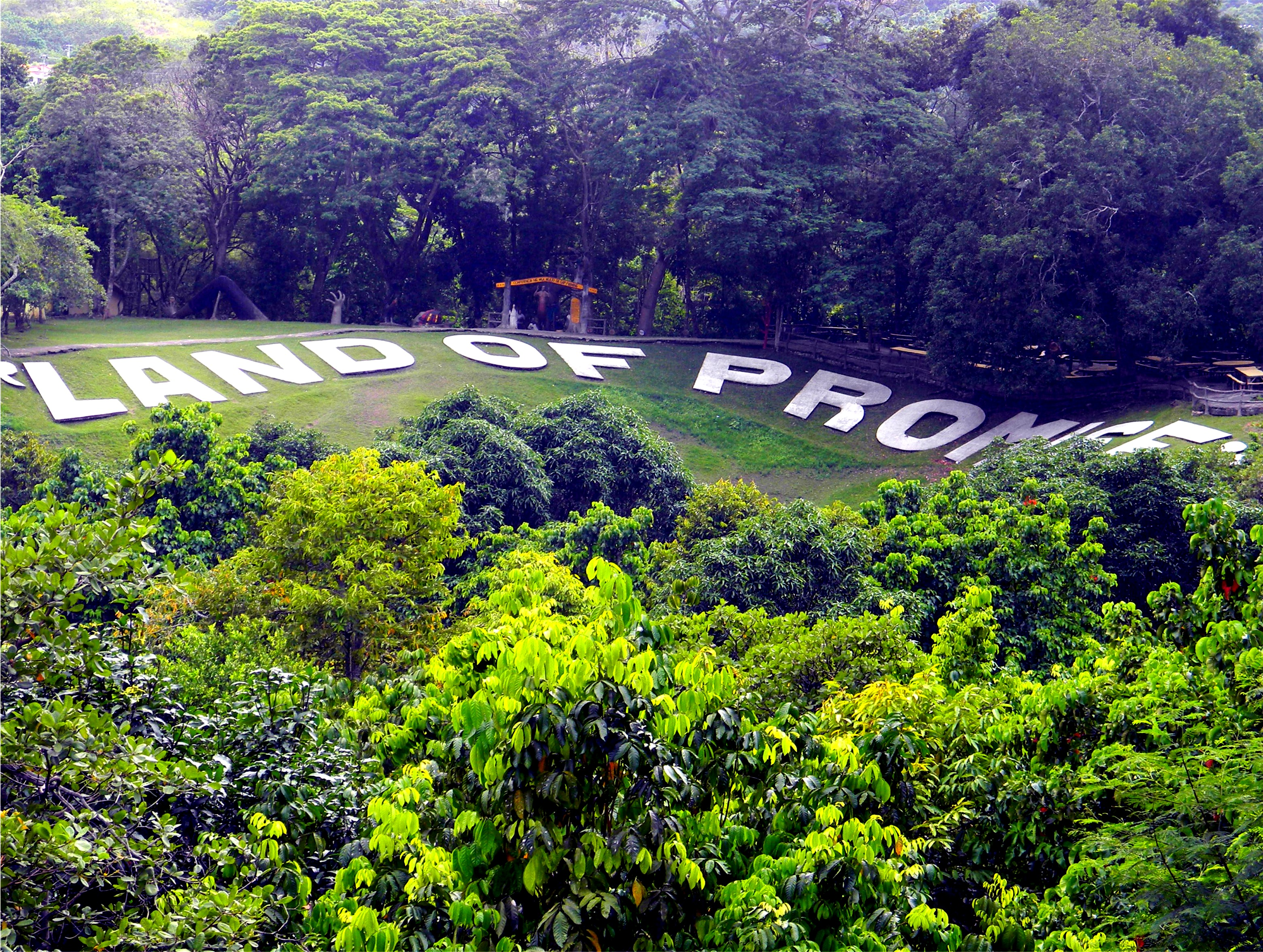
Land of Promise, located atop a hill at The Gap Farming Resort

The Philippine eagle, the country's national bird and considered the largest eagle in the world, is endemic to Davao. The orchid waling-waling and fruits such as durians, marang, rambutans, pomeloes and mangosteens are popular and generally cheaper in the city. Tourist destinations in the city include the Philippine Eagle Foundation and Nature Center, Mount Apo, Gap Farming Resort, the Davao Crocodile Park, Malagos Garden Resort, Eden Nature Park and People's Park in the city center which is popular for its sculptures of indigenous people and dancing fountain. Samal Island, a part of Metro Davao, is an island city situated immediately off the city's coast in Davao Gulf, popularly known for its scenic beaches.

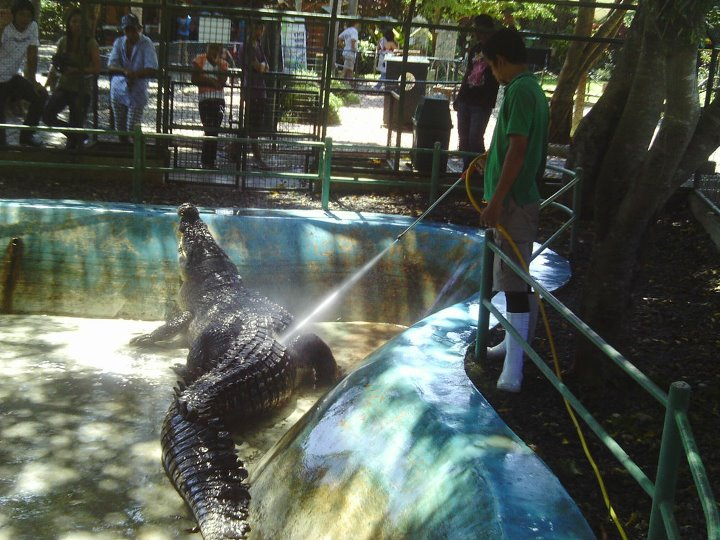
Pangil, the largest crocodile in captivity in the Philippines, at Davao Crocodile Park

Two major annual festivals are held in the city: the Araw ng Dabaw (Day of Davao) on March 1 (The city's incorporation day) and the Kadayawan Festival in August. Also celebrated in the entire month of December, Pasko Fiesta sa Davao is an integration of festive and competitive Christmas activities showcasing colorful lightings and array of decorations in barangays, public parks, roads and buildings, and a series of competitive performances. Since 2024, a new festival is being held every June, the Duaw Davao (Visit Davao) showcases the city's diverse attractions, and vibrant music festivities, which ignites Davao's tourism spirit. The festival is revolved around four pillars: Davao TOURismo, Fiesta sa San Pedro, Arts and Colors, and Sports and Lifestyle. Originally celebrated in late June, it was expanded through the whole month of June the next year. Formerly, the Torotot Festival was held annually every New Year's Eve. First organized in the last day of 2013 during the 2014 New Year's Eve, it was organized as a recompense for the city firecracker-pyrotechnics ban; it includes a number of people simultaneously blowing party horns, locally known as torotots. It recorded a number of 7,568 people participating in the first event, aiming to break the world record set by Japan for the most people simultaneously blowing party horns. Currently, it has been discontinued as the city's new year celebration is merged into Pasko Fiesta sa Davao, with the City Tourism themselves clarifying that the Torotot Festival was organized by a private company and there were no plans to host the said festival.

During 2011, there were 1.075 million recorded tourist arrivals in the city, totaled from 81,081 foreign travelers, 983,315 local citizens and 10,604 balikbayans/overseas Filipino workers. Estimated tourist receipts were recorded at 12.81 billion pesos while estimated economic benefits were 28.19 billion pesos.

== Government ==
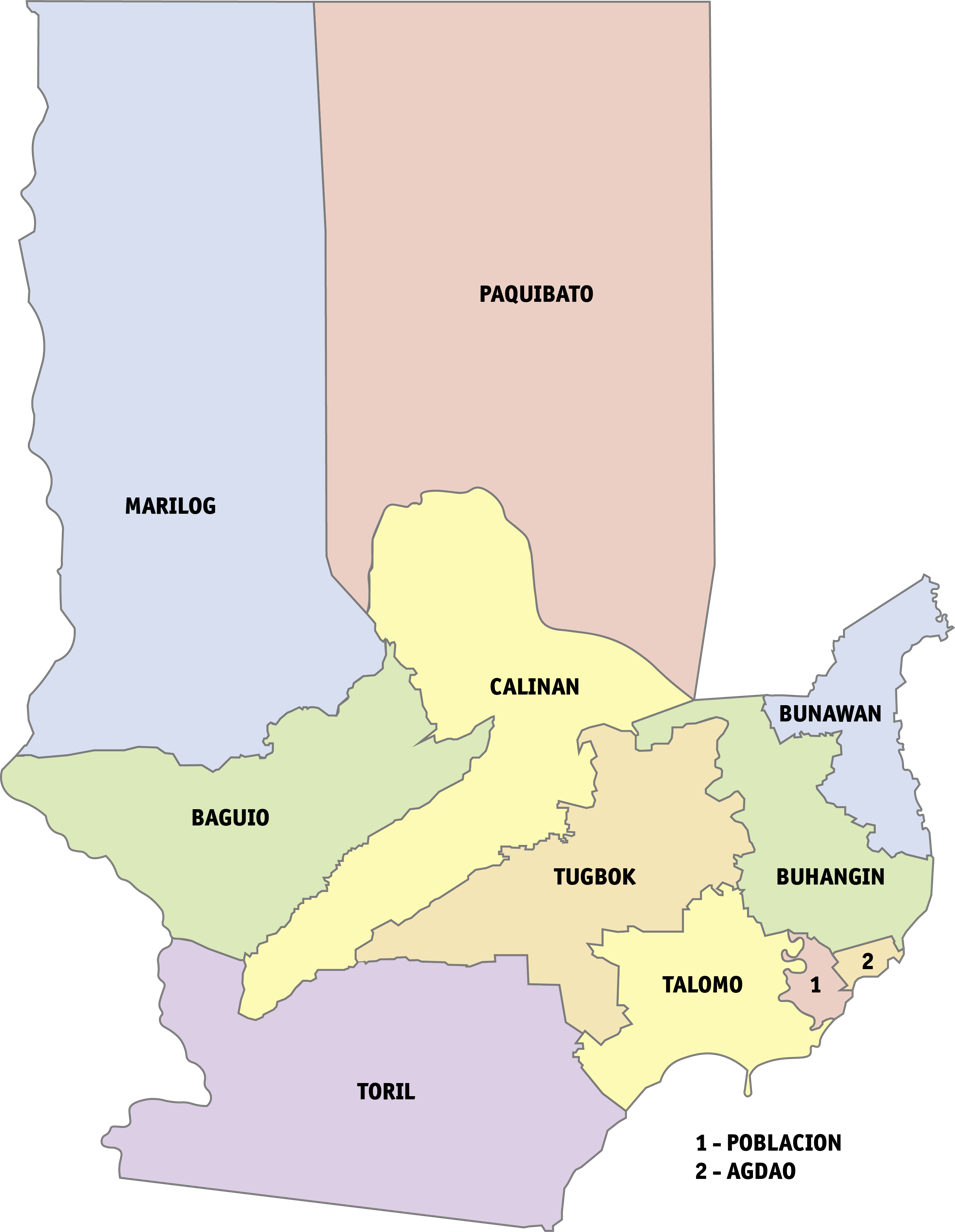
Political map of Davao City districts

Davao City has 182 barangays, with three legislative districts. The city government of Davao is proposing one more congressional district to serve its growing population.

=== Barangays ===
The 182 barangays of Davao City are arranged according to the three legislative districts and eleven administrative districts of the city.

=== Officials ===
Davao City Officials as of June 30, 2026:

- Mayor: Sebastian "Baste" Zimmerman Duterte (Partido Demokratiko Pilipino/Hugpong sa Tawong Lungsod)
- Vice Mayor: Rodrigo "Rigo" Sangkola Duterte II (Hugpong sa Tawong Lungsod)
- Representatives:
  - 1st District: Paolo Z. Duterte (HTL)
  - 2nd District: Omar Vincent S. Duterte (HTL)
  - 3rd District: Isidro T. Ungab (Bagong Pilipinas)
- City Councilors:
- 1st District
  - Ragde Niño P. Ibuyan Jr. (HNP)
  - Luna Maria Dominique S. Acosta (HNP)
  - Jessica M. Bonguyan (Ind.)
  - Temujin "Tek" B. Ocampo (HNP)
  - Pamela A. Librado (HTL)
  - Bonz Andre A. Militar (HTL)
  - J. Melchor B. Quitain Jr. (HTL)
- 2nd District
  - Richlyn "Che Che" N. Justol-Baguilod (HTL)
  - Danilo C. Dayanghirang (HTL)
  - Louie John J. Bonguyan (HNP)
  - Doce L. Apostol (PDP)
  - Atty. Diosdado Angelo R. Mahipus Jr. (HTL)
  - Arnolfo Ricardo B. Cabling (PDP)
  - Ralph O. Abella (PDP)
  - Al Ryan S. Alejandre (HTL)
- 3rd District
  - Alberto T. Ungab (HNP)
  - Antoinette G. Principe (HTL)
  - Dr. Trisha Ann "Potpot" J. Villafuerte (HNP)
  - Myrna G. Dalodo-Ortiz (HNP)
  - Bai Hundra Cassandra Dominique "Sweet" N. Advincula (HTL)
  - Rachel P. Zozobrado III (HTL)
  - Jose Marie Bernardo "Jopet" R. Baluran (HTL)
  - Lorenzo Benjamin "Enzo" D. Villafuerte (PDP)
Davao City Hall

Davao City Council Building

== Transportation ==
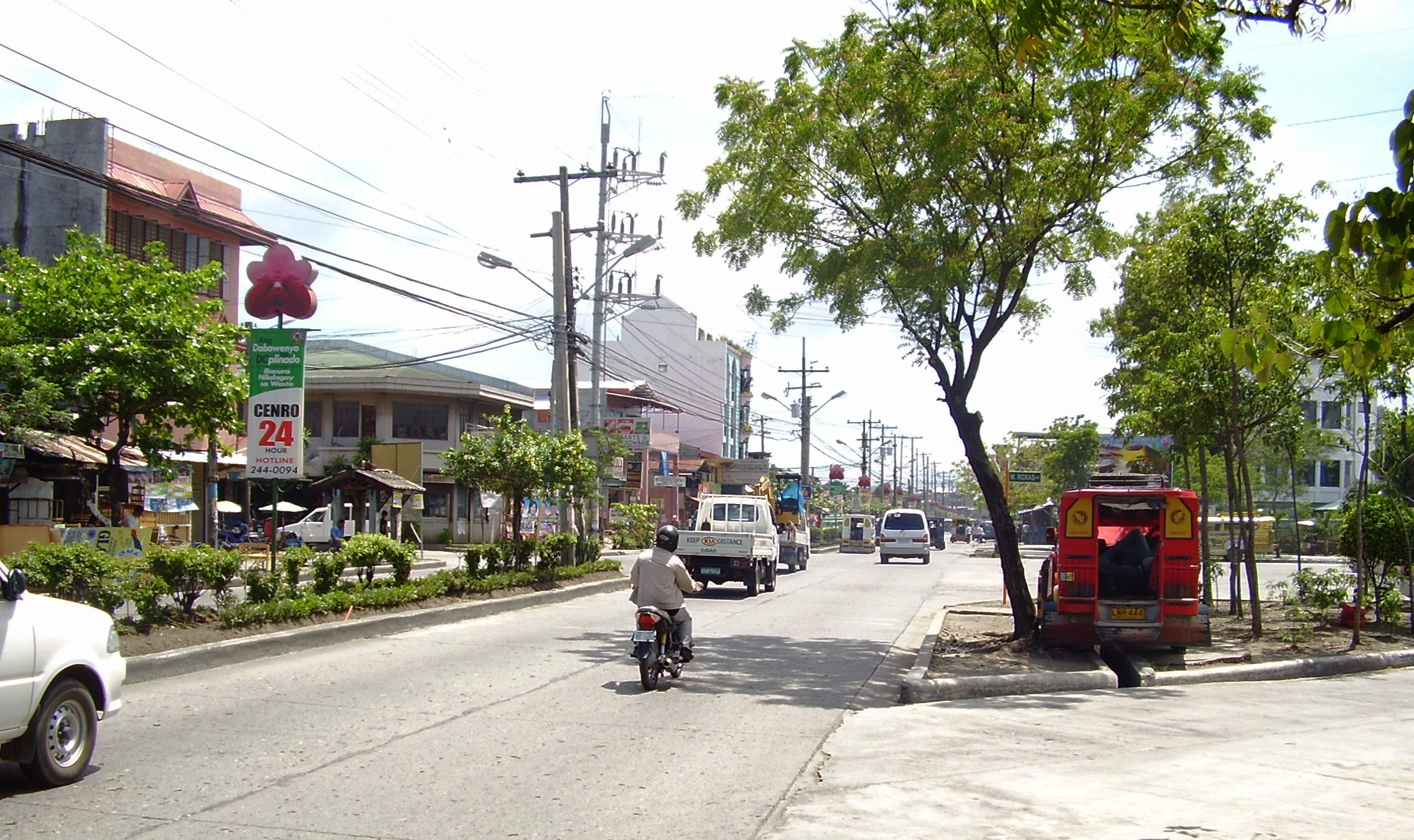
Quezon Boulevard

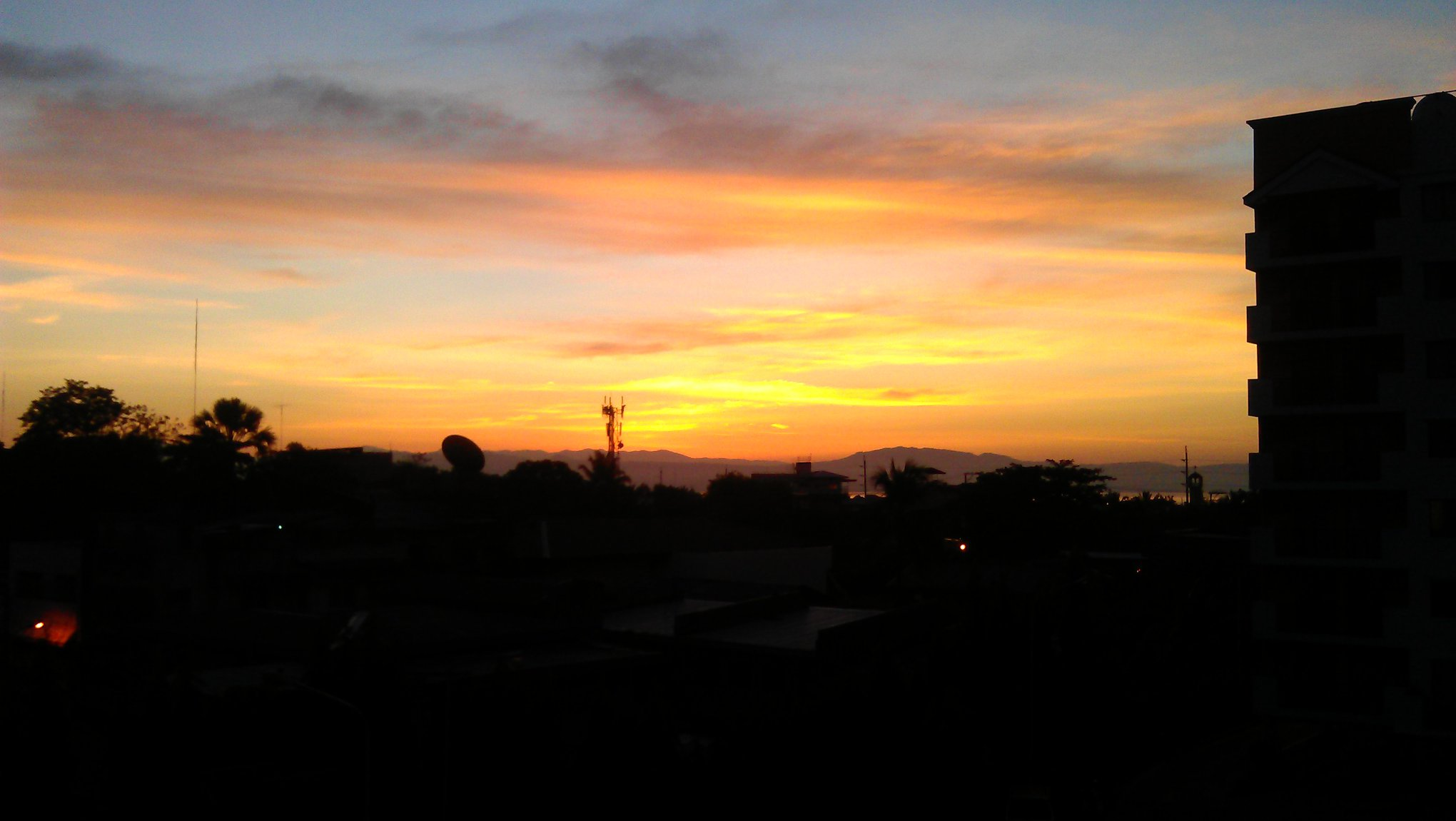
Sunrise over Bolton Street, Davao City, looking east with Samal Island on the horizon

=== Land ===
Popular modes of public transportation in the city are multicabs, jeepneys, tricycles, buses and taxis. Multicabs and jeepneys ply 82 designated passenger-vehicle routes around the clock. Tricycles ply routes beyond the main streets of the city. Taxis have several routes in and around Davao City. In mountainous areas, the habal-habal passenger motorcycle is the main mode of transportation

The city has the first taxis in the Philippines to accept payments from BancNet and MegaLink ATM and debit cards. The black taxis are linked to the Global Positioning System (GPS), and dispatching is done by computer.

The city offers a wide bus network to cities and provinces in Mindanao and as far as Pasay in Luzon, and Tagbilaran, Ormoc and Tacloban in the Visayas. The city is accessible by bus from several points in Mindanao such as Kidapawan, General Santos, Digos, Koronadal, Tagum, Tandag, Bislig, Mati, Monkayo, Malita, Butuan and Surigao.

Construction and improvement of roads and bridges in the city are underway. The city's third major road, the Buhangin Underpass, was completed in the first quarter of 2003. The Traffic Management and Computerization Scheme was implemented, considered one of the most modern in the country.

A 28-kilometer (17 mi) monorail project, named the Davao People Mover, has been endorsed by the City Government to the Department of Transportation (DOTr) and Philippine National Railways (PNR).

A road project, dubbed Davao City Bypass, was expected to be completed in 2022. It aims to reduce travel time from 1 hour and 44 minutes via Pan-Philippine Highway and Diversion Road to 49 minutes via Davao By-Pass road. However, it was postponed until 2028.

The Davao City Coastal Road is intended to provide an alternative route to the Pan-Philippine Highway in the southern part of the city, which has been experiencing heavy traffic congestion. It will also serve as a costal shore protection and breakwater.

==== Mindanao Railway Phase 1 (Tagum-Davao-Digos section) ====
The first phase of the Mindanao Railway is a 100-kilometer (62 mi) railway line connecting the cities of Davao Region: Tagum, Davao City and Digos. The project is set to have 8 stations and a daily ridership of 130,000, but it has not yet received funding from other countries or lenders. The project was supposed to be financed by the Chinese official development assistance, but it was taken away in 2023.

==== Davao Public Transport Modernization Project ====
Formerly known as the High Priority Bus System (HPBS), it includes the development of improved public transport operations that will cover the full urban area of the city. The project will overhaul the outdated services that provide a poor level of service in terms of coverage area, hours of operation, and passenger comfort and facilities. The project will introduce a city-wide bus-based public transport operating system, with improved and modern franchising mechanisms that ensure supply meets demand. This will be supported through traffic management improvements to prioritize bus services along a core network of around 110 kilometers (km).

The project involves delivering a modern, high-priority bus system for Metro Davao, wherein interconnected bus services will be prioritized along various inter-city routes. It will include 1,000 buses and 1,000 bus stops spread out in Davao City. Of the 1,000 buses, 300 will be electric articulated buses, 500 will be regular 12-meter buses, and 200 will be the smaller nine-meter buses. It has an allocated budget of ₱80 billion.

=== Sea ===
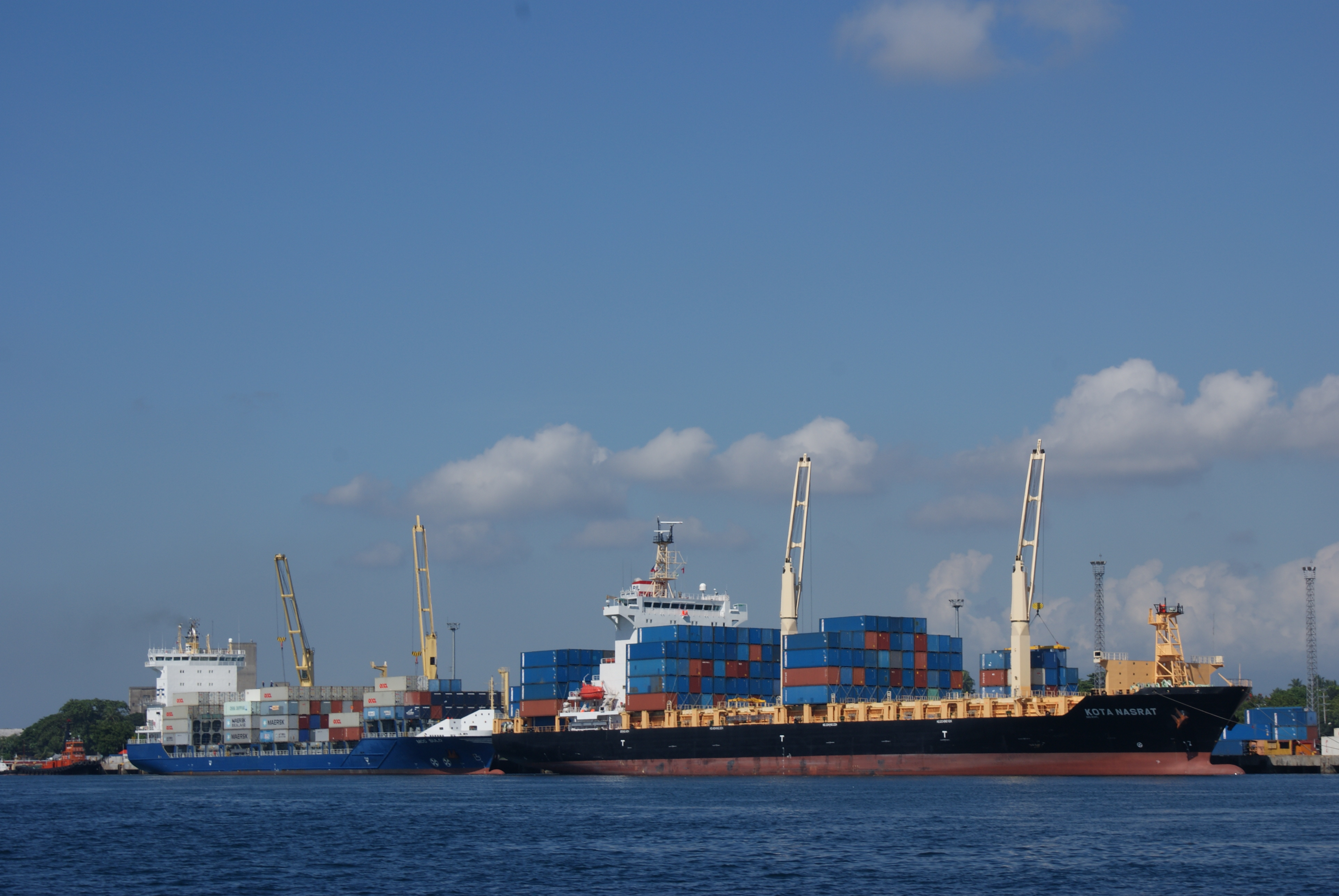
The Port of Davao is the busiest port in Mindanao.

Davao is connected to other major cities of the Philippines by roll-on/roll-off inter-island ferries. The city is served by domestic passenger ferries at Sasa International Seaport and Santa Ana Wharf, the international seaports of the Port of Davao, the busiest port in Mindanao. The port is capable of servicing inter-island and international shipments. It is located in Davao Gulf and has two approaches, one at Pakiputan Strait between Davao and western Samal Island.

The Davao City and General Santos to Bitung, Indonesia sea connectivity route has also had just been started very recently. This route will enable traders from Mindanao to easily export goods and commodities like food and beverage, electronics and garments, beauty products, fertilizer, construction materials, agricultural inputs, tin cans and packaging materials up to North Sulawesi in Indonesia. The roll-on-roll-off (Ro-Ro) shipping service which will serve the route is Asian Marine Transport, a Philippine-registered shipping firm and operator of the Super Shuttle Ferry, Super Shuttle Roro and Shuttle Fast Ferry vessels.

=== Air ===
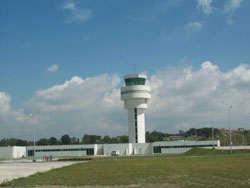
Francisco Bangoy International Airport's air traffic control tower is considered the most advanced ATC in the Philippines.

Located north of the city center, Francisco Bangoy International Airport is the main airport serving the city and the region. It is also the main international airport in Mindanao. Around 1966, Philippine Airlines (PAL), the country's flag carrier, began its first domestic jet service in the city. Since 2024, the airport has handled flights to five international destinations: Quanzhou, Singapore, Hongkong, Bangkok and Doha.

== Utilities ==
Davao Light and Power Company, an Aboitiz company which is the third-largest electric utility company in the country, serves the city's electricity needs. It had its own gas-operating power plant at Bajada district and 300-megawatt coal-fired power plant in Toril district.

Davao City Water District is the main water supplier in the city. It obtains its water supply from the mountain springs in the city's western portion as well as from underground or surface water sources. The city's water supply runs through the company's production wells, sumps and reservoirs within the city. Its biggest water supply system is located at Barangay Dumoy.

== Healthcare ==
There are 31 hospitals and tertiary centers in the city like the United Davao Specialists Hospital and Medical Center, Inc. (Unidav), Davao Doctors Hospital, San Pedro Hospital, Brokenshire Medical Center, Ricardo Limso Medical Center, Davao Medical School Foundation Hospital (DMSF Hospital), Metro Davao Medical and Research Center, Adventist Hospital, MMG Hospital, CHDC Hospital and the Southern Philippines Medical Center. In addition, CURE International, a non-profit organization that operates charitable hospitals and programs worldwide, operates the Tebow CURE Hospital, which is an orthopedic specialty hospital located in Davao City. It provides elective surgeries to both children and adults. Their primary charitable mission is to heal disabled children with conditions such as clubfoot, bowed legs, other bone deformities, untreated burns and cleft lip. Ecoland Medical and Wellness Center (EcoMed), one of the first DOH-licensed private primary care facilities in Mindanao, is located along Quimpo Boulevard in the southern part of the city. EcoMed offers primary healthcare and diagnostic services (laboratory, radiology and pharmacy), a 24-hour outpatient department (that includes a birthing facility and minor operating room) that can handle and treat minor and primary health emergencies, and a range of outpatient healthcare services through its renal dialysis unit, doctor's clinics (covering a range of specializations), and its ambulatory surgical unit.

Davao City is also noted and have been praised by the World Health Organization for its smoke-free policy since 2002, the first in the Philippines.

== Law and order ==
Law and order is maintained by the Philippine National Police and a special military group, Task Force (TF) Davao. TF Davao is formed to protect the city from terrorist attacks and other crime and is affiliated with the Philippine Army and headed by an army colonel.

A curfew on minors is enforced. All businesses, especially bars and discos, are mandated by a city ordinance to stop selling alcoholic drinks at 1:00 am (final approval last July 24, 2013). Motorcyclists without helmets and motorists with defective lights are not legally allowed to enter (or drive in) the city. Executive Order No. 39 imposes the reduction of speed limits for all kinds of motor vehicles within the territorial jurisdiction of Davao City.

Former President Rodrigo Duterte, mayor of Davao for 22 years, has been credited with making Davao one of the world's safest cities. Rights groups, however, claim that he cites this as justification for his national drug policy. Raw crime data from the Philippine National Police for the years 2010 to 2015 shows that the city had the highest murder rate in the Philippines, and the second-highest number of rapes.

In February 2018, the Davao City Council officially declared Senator Antonio Trillanes "persona non grata" after Trillanes portrayed the city as the most dangerous in the Philippines and likening Dabawenyos to North Koreans who are easily brainwashed by President Rodrigo Duterte. "Safest city" rankings are often cited from Numbeo, a crowd-sourced survey website; as of February 2018, Davao had dropped to 275th out of 330 cities in Numbeo's "crime index".

The Public Safety and Security Command Center (PSSCC), the first in the Philippines, is located in Sandawa, Matina. It is headquarters for 911 and the center for the 170 closed-circuit television (CCTV) cameras installed in different strategic areas as of today covering access roads and populated downtown areas, and also including outside the Francisco Bangoy International Airport and six in different bridges to monitor the rise of water level in the city's rivers. The center also controls traffic signals in the city.

In Davao City, by city ordinance, police ensure that prostitutes have a valid health card, but do not arrest them, as prostitution is considered a health issue for the women involved and is not a police matter. Jeanette Ampog, the executive director of Talikala, a Davao-based NGO that helps prostitutes, said in October 2016 that child prostitution had sharply increased over the past two years. She said that children were cheaper and more marketable. Nevertheless, the city was awarded "Most Child-Friendly City for Highly Urbanized Category" in 2013, 2014 and 2017. The city also won the same award in 1998 and 1999. Also in 2017, the city was awarded with the "Best Disaster Risk Reduction and Management".

The city's Executive Order No. 04, Series of 2013 imposes an order on creating the implementation of rules and regulations for the new comprehensive anti-smoking ordinance no. 0367–12, Series of 2012. Davao City's Firecracker Ban was also implemented with ordinance No. 060-02/1406-02, Series of 2002.

From 2015 to 2017, Davao City was among the local government units awarded with a "Seal of Good Local Governance" by the Department of the Interior and Local Government.

=== Davao Death Squad ===
The controversial Davao Death Squad is a vigilante group supposedly active in Davao City. The group is allegedly responsible for summary executions of street children and individuals suspected of petty crimes and dealing in drugs in Davao. It has been estimated that the group is responsible for the killing or disappearance of between 1,020 and 1,040 people between 1998 and 2008. An investigation in 2009 was later discontinued. Another investigation by the Office of the Ombudsman was opened and closed in 2019, stating that they found no evidence that the alleged group exists.

== Sports ==
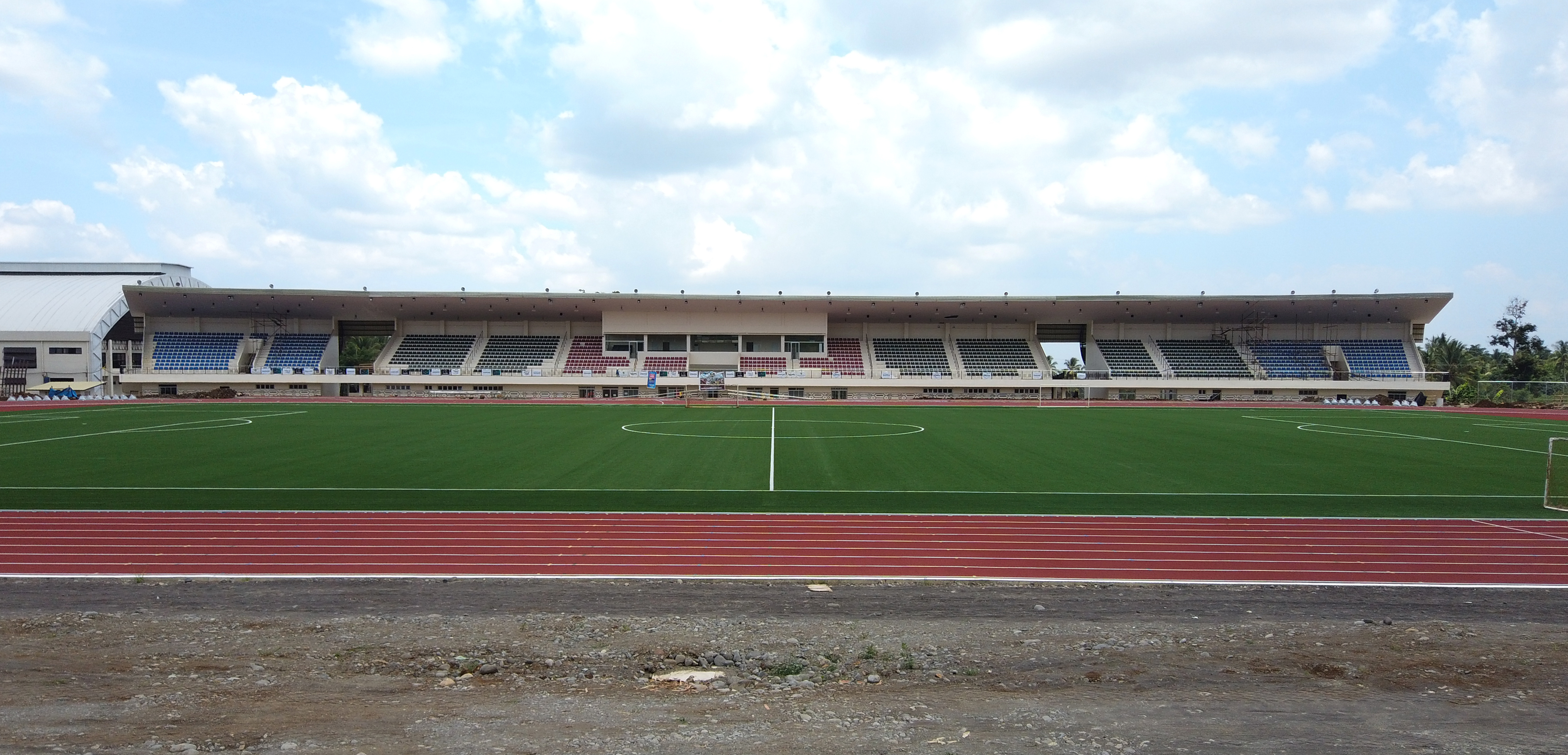
The stadium and track-and-field area of Davao City Sports Complex.

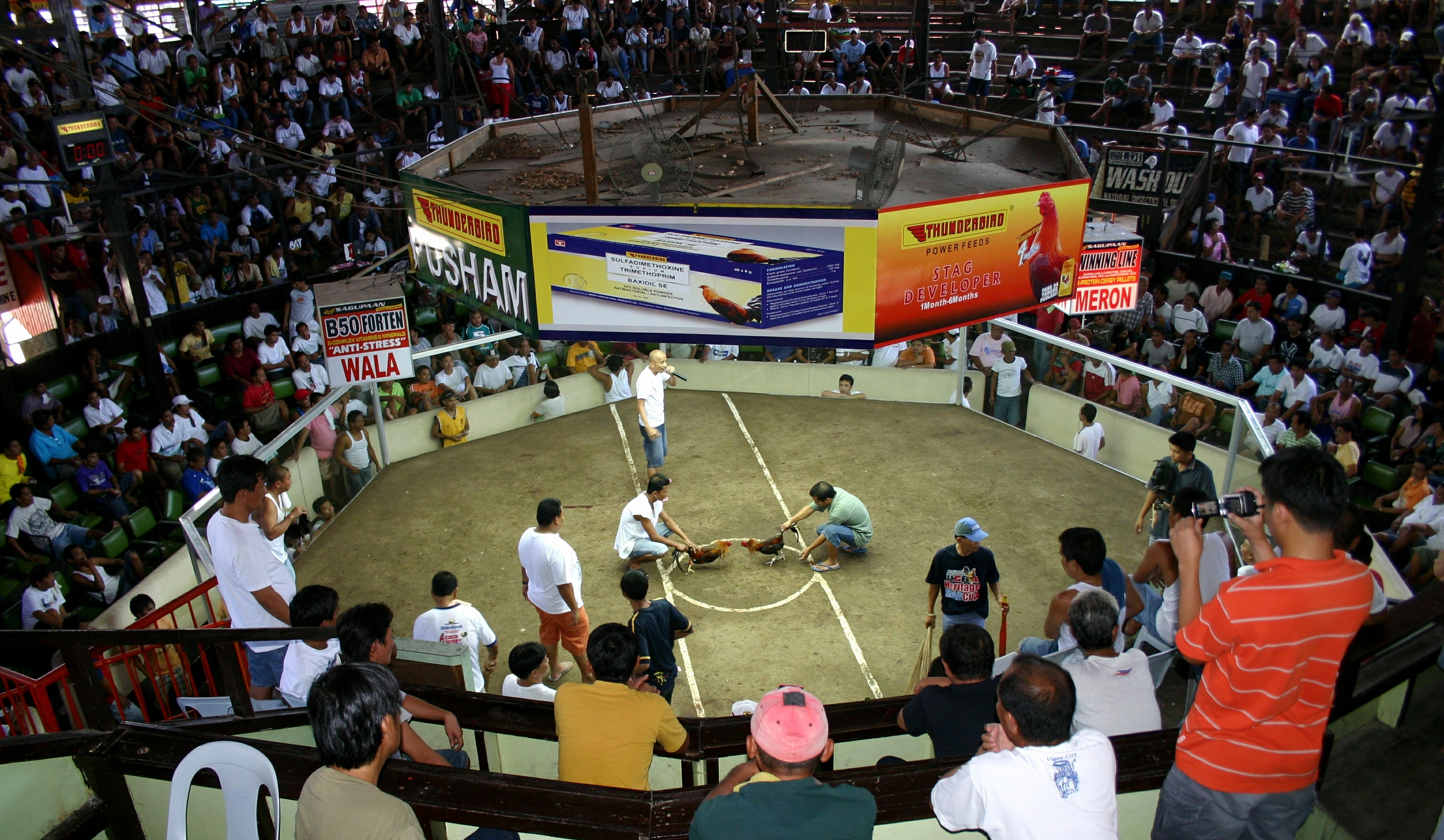
Sabong or cockfight in Davao City.

Sports facilities in the city include the Davao City Recreation Center (Almendras Gymnasium), Tionko Football Field (near Agro College and the Davao River) and the gymnasiums of Ateneo de Davao University, Philippine Women's College of Davao's Rosa Santos Munda Events Center (RSM Events Center), the University of Southeastern Philippines, Holy Cross of Davao College, the University of Mindanao and Mintal Comprehensive High School. The main sports center of Davao City and also the largest is the Davao City Sports Complex, which hosted the 2019 National Games.

There are locally based sports teams in the city. Davao Football Association, working under the Philippine Football Federation, represents the city and Davao Region for national football events. Locally based basketball teams such as Goldstar Davao and Duterte Agilas work for the Mindanao Visayas Basketball Association. Collegiate varsity teams based in the tertiary institutions inside the city also compete in national competitions. Despite being based outside of the city or province, the Davao Occidental Tigers of the Maharlika Pilipinas Basketball League (MPBL) normally play their home games in Davao City.

Sabong or cockfighting events are also held in cockfighting arenas within the city. In June 2015, the city held the country's largest cockfighting event, the sixth Annual Thunderbird Challenge.

== Education ==
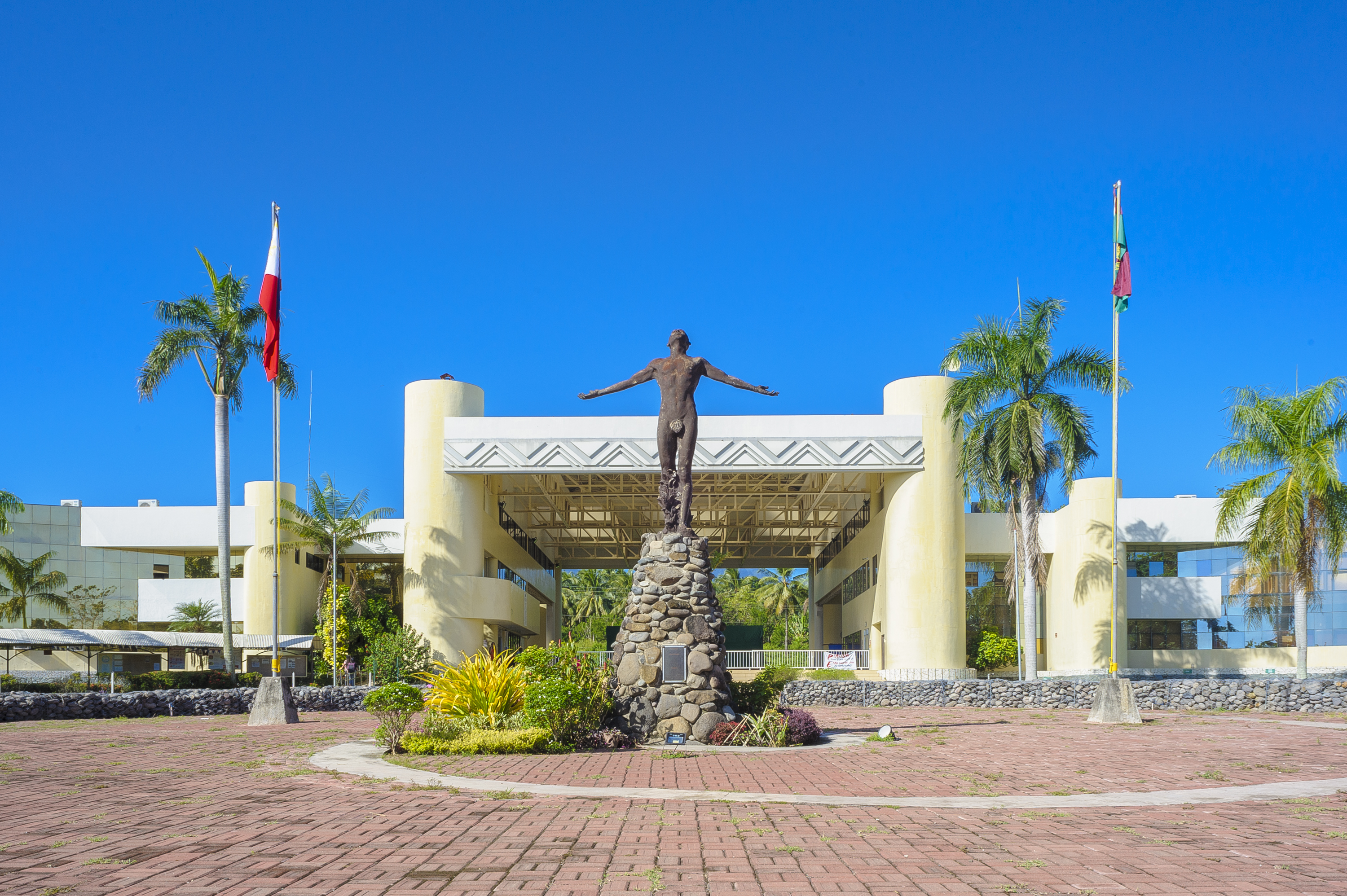
University of the Philippines Mindanao

The city government provides free education at the primary (grade school) and secondary (high school) levels at public institutions. Currently, as sanctioned by the Department of Education, all primary and secondary institutions in the city use the K–12 educational system. The city currently hosts six universities.

== Media ==
Mindanao Media Hub

Outlets such as ABS-CBN (now defunct), GMA Network, TV5, PTV, RPN and IBC maintain local stations in the city. The broadcast coverage of these media stations includes the entire Davao Region as well as some areas beyond the region.

There are media networks based in the city as well. Davao Christian Broadcasting Channel and Sonshine Media Network International are two religion-oriented media networks, with the latter being owned by pastor Apollo Quiboloy of the Kingdom of Jesus Christ church. The locally based community network SouthSpot broadcasts only on cable television. (later suspended by the NTC)

In addition to 34 national newspapers, Davao City has 26 local daily newspapers, including the SunStar Davao, the city-based Mindanao Times and the Mindanao Examiner.

=== TV Stations ===
- TV5 Channel 2 (TV5 Network, Inc.) (also on DTT Channel 18)
- ALLTV Channel 4 (Advanced Media Broadcasting System) (also on DTT Channel 16)
- GMA Channel 5 (GMA Network, Inc.) (also on DTT Channel 37)
- Solar Learning Channel 7 (Southern Broadcasting Network) (also on DTT Channel 21)
- RPTV Channel 9 (TV5 Network, Inc./Radio Philippines Network/Nine Media Corporation) (also on DTT Channel 24)
- PTV Channel 11 (People's Television Network) (also on DTT Channel 45)
- IBC Channel 13 (Intercontinental Broadcasting Corporation) (also on DTT Channel 17)
- EBN Channel 15 (External Broadcasting Network) (also on DTT Channel 26)
- PBN Channel 17 (Prime Broadcasting Network)
- Tap PH Channel 19 (Tap Digital Media Ventures Corporation/Radio Philippines Network/Nine Media Corporation)
- A2Z Channel 20 (ZOE Broadcasting Network and ABS-CBN Corporation) (DTT Channel 20)
- Aliw Channel 21 (Aliw Broadcasting Corporation)
- RJTV Channel 23 (Rajah Broadcasting Network)
- Hope Channel Philippines Channel 25 (Hope Channel Philippines) (soon on DTT)
- GTV Channel 27 (GMA Network, Inc.)
- One Sports Channel 29 (TV5 Network, Inc./Nation Broadcasting Corporation)
- BEAM TV-33 (Broadcast Enterprises and Affiliated Media) (also on DTT Channel 31)
- DZRH News Television Channel 33 (Manila Broadcasting Company) (also on DTT Channel 33)
- Brigada TV Channel 35 (Brigada Mass Media Corporation)
- FBTV Channel 37 (External Broadcasting Network/Sony Pictures Television)
- Net 25 Channel 39 (Eagle Broadcasting Corporation) (also on DTT Channel 39)
- GNN Channel 41 (Golden Nation Network) (also on DTT Channel 41)
- Sonshine TV-43 (Sonshine Media Network International) (also on DTT Channel 19)
- Tap Sports Channel 45 (Tap Digital Media Ventures Corporation/AMCARA Broadcasting Network)
- One PH Channel 47 (TV5 Network, Inc./Southern Broadcasting Network)
- ZFC Channel 49 (GMA Network, Inc./Subic Broadcasting Corporation)
- UNTV Channel 51 (Information Broadcast Unlimited) (also DTT Channel 51)
- Lifetime Filipino Channel 53 (External Broadcasting Network/A+E Global Media)

==== Cable TV Providers ====
- Sky Cable Davao
- Davao Cableworld Network
- Bongao Cable TV
- Cignal TV
- G Sat Direct TV

== Foreign relations ==
The influx of foreign visitors and the presence of expatriates and migrants in the city have prompted the governments of Japan, China, Malaysia and Indonesia to open Consulates-General in the city, while Palau and the United States have consular offices. Honorary consulates of the Czech Republic, Mexico, Austria, Spain, Timor Leste, Denmark, and South Korea were also recently established. The United States Embassy in the Philippines opened a virtual consulate, where inquiries regarding visas, foreign-relations concerns and travel to the United States can be made by e-mail and chat. The virtual consulate is maintained in coordination with Ateneo de Davao University, University of Mindanao, University of the Immaculate Conception, Holy Cross of Davao College and AMA Computer College.

== Twin towns – sister cities ==
Davao City's sister cities are:

- Bitung, North Sulawesi, Indonesia
- Jinjiang, Fujian, China
- Kauaʻi County, Hawaii, United States
- Manado, North Sulawesi, Indonesia
- Nanning, Guangxi, China
- Tacoma, Washington, United States
- Sennan, Osaka Prefecture, Japan
- Hamamatsu, Shizuoka Prefecture, Japan

=== Cooperation and friendship ===
- Uijeongbu, Gyeonggi-do, South Korea
- Incheon, South Korea
- Kitakyushu, Fukuoka, Japan ("environmental sister city")

=== Domestic cooperation ===
Within Philippines, Davao City cooperates with:

- Angeles City
- Basud
- Cabanatuan
- Cebu City
- City of Mati
- Mandaue
- Lapu-Lapu City
- Dapitan
- Iloilo City
- Liloan
- Marikina
- Quezon City
- San Jose del Monte
- San Juan
- Zamboanga City

== Notable people ==
Businessman and politician

- Ernesto Abella, Undersecretary for Strategic Communications and Research Department of Foreign Affairs
- Sara Duterte, current Vice President of the Philippines.
- Dennis Uy, business magnate, diplomat
- Sebastian Duterte, 33rd Mayor of Davao City.
- Rodrigo Duterte, 16th President of the Philippines.
- Bong Go, senator and politician
- Claudine Bautista-Lim, Member of the House of Representatives of the Philippines for the DUMPER Partylist
- Rigo Duterte, 15th Vice Mayor of Davao City
- Lorna Bautista-Bandigan, Vice Governor of Davao Occidental
- Nilo Demerey Jr., 4th Governor of Dinagat Islands

Lawyer and Lawmaker

- Isidro Ungab, congressman
- Mans Carpio, lawyer, second gentleman of the Philippines.
- Karlo Nograles, lawyer
- Migs Nograles, congresswoman
- Antonio Carpio, former associate jusctice
- Paolo Duterte, Member of the House of Representatives from Davao City's 1st district
- Harold Duterte, Member of the House of Representatives of the Philippines for Puwersa ng Pilipinong Pandagat
- Omar Duterte, Member of the House of Representatives from Davao City's 2nd district

Entertainment

- Gladys Reyes, actress
- Erich Gonzales, actress
- Sharmaine Arnaiz, actress
- Chokoleit, actor, comedian
- Jona Soquite, singer, The Voice Teens season 1 champion

Religion

- Apollo Quiboloy, Filipino religious leader and founder of Kingdom of Jesus Christ (church)

Science

- Alfredo E. Evangelista, archeologist

Journalist

- Alex Santos, journalist, newscaster; currently for Net 25

Other

- Jay Durias, lead vocalist of South Border
- Juris Fernandez, singer
- Elizabeth Zimmerman, former wife of Rodrigo Duterte, 16th President of the Philippines
- Rolando "Rastaman" Plaza, internet personality and political aspirant

== See also ==
- KJC King Dome
- Francisco Bangoy International Airport
- Tallest buildings in Davao City
- Zarate v. Aquino III
