= List of current Philippine city mayors =

List of all the city mayors and vice mayors of the Philippines

There are 38 cities in the Philippines that are classified as highly urbanized cities or independent component cities that are independent from the provinces.

Each highly urbanized or independent component city has a mayor who is the chief executive of the city government. The mayor is elected by the voters in the province for a three-year term with a maximum of three consecutive terms. To run for mayor of a highly urbanized or an independent component city, a candidate must be a Philippine citizen, a registered voter in the city, a resident of the city for at least one year before the election, able to read or write Filipino or any other local language or dialect and at least 23 years old in a highly urbanized city or 21 years old in an independent component city on election day.

Each city also has a vice mayor who serves as the presiding officer of the sangguniang panlungsod. The vice mayor assumes the office of mayor when there is a permanent vacancy. When the office of mayor is temporarily vacant, the vice mayor assumes office as acting mayor. The vice mayor is also elected by the voters in the province for a three-year term with a maximum of three consecutive terms. The eligibility requirements for vice mayor are the same as for mayor.

One municipality in the Philippines is independent from the provinces. A municipality has a mayor who is the chief executive of the municipal government and has a vice mayor who is the presiding officer of the sangguniang bayan. The election and qualifications of the mayor and vice mayor of a municipality is the same as that of a mayor and vice mayor of an independent component city.

The current term of the city mayors and vice mayors is from June 30, 2025, until June 30, 2028.

== List of city mayors ==
Independent city or municipality	Portrait	Mayor	Party	Term	Age	Prior experience	Assumed office
Angeles City (list)		Carmelo Lazatin II	Lakas	1	June 4, 1970 (age 56)	Businessman House of Representatives Angeles City Council	June 30, 2025
Bacolod (list)		Greg Gasataya	NPC	1	November 19, 1970 (age 56)	Journalist House of Representatives Vice Mayor of Bacolod Bacolod City Council	June 30, 2025
Baguio (list)		Benjamin Magalong	NPC	3	December 15, 1960 (age 65)	Retired police officer Deputy Chief for Operations of the Philippine National Police	June 30, 2019
Butuan (list)		Lawrence Fortun	Nacionalista	1	August 7, 1971 (age 55)	Lawyer Vice Mayor of Butuan House of Representatives Butuan City Council	June 30, 2025
Cagayan de Oro (list)		Rolando Uy	PFP	2	July 5, 1954 (age 72)	House of Representatives	June 30, 2022
Caloocan (list)		Along Malapitan	Nacionalista	2	October 31, 1979 (age 47)	House of Representatives Caloocan City Council	June 30, 2022
Cebu City (list)		Nestor Archival	Liberal	1	June 2, 1958 (age 68)	Electrical engineer, businessman, environmentalist Cebu City Council	June 30, 2025
Cotabato City		Bruce Matabalao	BFP	2	March 20, 1974 (age 52)	Radio personality Cotabato City Council	June 30, 2022
Dagupan		Belen Fernandez	PFP	2	May 6, 1957 (age 69)	Businesswoman Vice Mayor of Dagupan Dagupan City Council	June 30, 2022
Davao City (list)		Sebastian Duterte	HTL	0	November 3, 1987 (age 39)	Businessman Vice Mayor of Davao City Mayor of Davao City	January 23, 2026 (Note: Sebastian Duterte assumed office on January 23, 2026, after Rodrigo Duterte, who was elected in the 2025 mayoral election, was unable to assume office due to being detained by the International Criminal Court. Prior to assuming office, Sebastian served as acting mayor from June 30, 2025.)
General Santos (list)		Lorelie Pacquiao	PCM	2	April 14, 1979 (age 47)	General Santos Association of Barangay Captains President	June 30, 2022
Iligan		Frederick Siao	Nacionalista	2	November 29, 1966 (age 59)	Businessman House of Representatives Iligan City Council	June 30, 2022
Iloilo City (list)		Raisa Treñas	NUP	1	November 27, 1985 (age 40)	Businesswoman	June 30, 2025
Lapu-Lapu City		Cynthia Chan	PFP	1	March 10, 1968 (age 58)	House of Representatives	June 30, 2025
Las Piñas (list)		April Aguilar	NPC	1	April 6, 1970 (age 56)	Vice Mayor of Las Piñas	June 30, 2025
Lucena (list)		Mark Alcala	Stan Q	2	February 23, 1996 (age 30)	City government staff	June 30, 2022
Makati (list)		Nancy Binay	UNA	1	May 12, 1973 (age 53)	Senate	June 30, 2025
Malabon (list)		Jeannie Sandoval	Nacionalista	2	January 14, 1965 (age 61)	Vice Mayor of Malabon	June 30, 2022
Mandaluyong (list)		Carmelita Abalos	PFP	1	July 2, 1962 (age 64)	Vice Mayor of Mandaluyong Mayor of Mandaluyong	June 30, 2025
Mandaue (list)		Jonkie Ouano	Lakas	1	November 16, 1974 (age 52)	Businessman Cebu Provincial Board	June 30, 2025
Manila (list)		Isko Moreno	Aksyon	1	October 24, 1974 (age 52)	Actor Mayor of Manila Department of Social Welfare and Development Undersecretary Vice Mayor of Manila Manila City Council	June 30, 2025
Marikina (list)		Maan Teodoro	NUP	1	January 9, 1981 (age 45)	Teacher House of Representatives	June 30, 2025
Muntinlupa (list)		Ruffy Biazon	1Munti	2	March 20, 1969 (age 57)	House of Representatives Bureau of Customs Commissioner Director of the Videogram Regulatory Board	June 30, 2022
Naga (list)		Leni Robredo	Liberal	1	April 23, 1965 (age 61)	Lawyer Vice President of the Philippines House of Representatives	June 30, 2025
Navotas (list)		John Rey Tiangco	Navoteño	2	November 21, 1972 (age 54)	House of Representatives Mayor of Navotas	June 30, 2022
Olongapo		Rolen Paulino Jr.	Nacionalista	2	April 8, 1991 (age 35)	Lawyer	June 30, 2022
Ormoc		Lucy Torres-Gomez	PFP	2	December 11, 1974 (age 51)	Actress House of Representatives	June 30, 2022
Parañaque (list)		Edwin Olivarez	Lakas	1	December 11, 1974 (age 51)	Businessman House of Representatives Mayor of Parañaque Vice Governor of Laguna Laguna Provincial Board	June 30, 2025
Pasay (list)		Emi Rubiano	PFP	3	August 16, 1960 (age 66)	Businesswoman House of Representatives Pasay City Council	June 30, 2019
Pasig (list)		Vico Sotto	Independent	3	June 17, 1989 (age 37)	Pasig City Council	June 30, 2019
Pateros (list)		Gerald German	PFP	1	September 18, 1979 (age 47)	Municipal Administrator of Pateros Vice Mayor of Pateros Pateros Municipal Council	June 30, 2025
Puerto Princesa		Lucilo Bayron	PFP	3	July 7, 1946 (age 80)	Vice Mayor of Puerto Princesa	June 22, 2017 (Note: Lucilo Bayron was reinstated on June 22, 2017, after being dismissed on February 10, 2017. Prior to his dismissal, Bayron assumed office on June 30, 2013.)
Quezon City (list)		Joy Belmonte	SBP	3	March 15, 1970 (age 56)	Entrepreneur, archeologist Vice Mayor of Quezon City	June 30, 2019
San Juan (list)		Francis Zamora	PFP	3	December 5, 1977 (age 48)	Basketball player Vice Mayor of San Juan San Juan City Council	June 30, 2019
Santiago		Alyssa Sheena Dy	PFP	2	August 19, 1992 (age 34)	Lawyer, accountant House of Representatives	June 30, 2022
Tacloban (list)		Alfred Romualdez	Nacionalista	3	January 14, 1962 (age 64)	Businessman Mayor of Tacloban House of Representatives	June 30, 2019
Taguig (list)		Lani Cayetano	Nacionalista	2	December 11, 1981 (age 44)	House of Representatives Mayor of Taguig	June 30, 2022
Valenzuela (list)		Wes Gatchalian	NPC	2	August 11, 1980 (age 46)	House of Representatives	June 30, 2022
Zamboanga City (list)		Khymer Olaso	Nacionalista	1	March 22, 1978 (age 48)	Master mariner House of Representatives Zamboanga City Council	June 30, 2025

== City vice mayors ==
Independent city or municipality	Portrait	Vice mayor	Party	Term	Age	Prior experience	Assumed office
Angeles City		Amos Rivera	PRP	1	June 20, 1977 (age 49)	Businessman Angeles City Council	June 30, 2025
Bacolod		Kalaw Puentevella	NPC	1	January 9, 1979 (age 47)	Businessman Bacolod City Council	June 30, 2025
Baguio		Faustino Olowan	PFP	3	April 19, 1965 (age 61)	Lawyer Baguio City Council	June 30, 2019
Butuan		Rey Desiata	Nacionalista	1	January 12, 1977 (age 49)	Butuan City Council	June 30, 2025
Cagayan de Oro		Jocelyn Rodriguez	CDP	2	August 3, 1959 (age 67)	Nurse Barangay chairperson	June 30, 2022
Caloocan		Karina Teh	Nacionalista	2	January 31, 1987 (age 39)	Researcher Caloocan City Council	June 30, 2022
Cebu City		Tomas Osmeña	Liberal	1	July 26, 1948 (age 78)	Agriculturist Mayor of Cebu City House of Representatives	June 30, 2025
Cotabato City		Johair Madag	BFP	1	November 18, 1975 (age 51)	Barangay chairperson	June 30, 2025
Dagupan		Dean Bryan Kua	PFP	3	June 25, 1985 (age 41)	Dagupan Association of Barangay Captains President	June 30, 2019
Davao City		Rigo Duterte	HTL	0	February 23, 1998 (age 28)	Businessman Davao City Council	January 23, 2026 (Note: Rigo Duterte assumed office on January 23, 2026, after Sebastian Duterte assumed office as mayor upon Rodrigo Duterte's inability to assume office due to being detained by the International Criminal Court. Prior to assuming office, Rigo served as acting vice mayor from June 30, 2025.)
General Santos		Ed Yumang	RCRI	1	December 10, 1971 (age 54)	Lawyer General Santos City Council	June 30, 2025
Iligan		Wekwek Uy	PMP	1	May 14, 1971 (age 55)	Businessman	June 30, 2025
Iloilo City		Love Baronda	PFP	1	November 27, 1985 (age 40)	Iloilo City Council	June 30, 2025
Lapu-Lapu City		Celsi Sitoy	PFP	3	August 31, 1939 (age 87)	Physician Mayor of Cordova	June 30, 2019
Las Piñas		Imelda Aguilar	NPC	1	February 6, 1947 (age 79)	Mayor of Las Piñas	June 30, 2025
Lucena		Roderick Alcala	Stan Q	2	October 17, 1971 (age 55)	Mayor of Lucena Vice Mayor of Lucena Lucena City Council	June 30, 2022
Makati		Kid Peña	NPC	1	August 5, 1969 (age 57)	House of Representatives Mayor of Makati Vice Mayor of Makati Makati Association of Barangay Captains President	June 30, 2025
Malabon		Edward Nolasco	Lakas	1	March 14, 1978 (age 48)	Malabon City Council	June 30, 2025
Mandaluyong		Anthony Suva	PFP	1	September 25, 1970 (age 56)	Businessman Mandaluyong City Council Vice Mayor of Mandaluyong	June 30, 2025
Mandaue		Glenn Bercede	Lakas	1	March 3, 1958 (age 68)	Mayor of Mandaue Vice Mayor of Mandaue Cebu Provincial Board Mandaue City Council	June 30, 2025
Manila		Chi Atienza	Aksyon	1	July 26, 1981 (age 45)	Journalist	June 30, 2025
Marikina		Del de Guzman	Lakas	1	January 9, 1963 (age 63)	Mayor of Marikina House of Representatives Vice Mayor of Marikina Marikina Municipal Council	June 30, 2025
Muntinlupa		Phanie Teves	Independent	1	June 2, 1988 (age 38)	Businesswoman Municipal Administrator of Naujan, Oriental Mindoro Muntinlupa City Council	June 30, 2025
Naga		Gabriel Bordado	Liberal	1	February 15, 1955 (age 71)	Writer House of Representatives Vice Mayor of Naga Naga City Council	June 30, 2025
Navotas (list)		Tito Sanchez	Navoteño	2	February 6, 1957 (age 69)	Navotas City Council	June 30, 2022
Olongapo		Kaye Ann Legaspi	Aksyon	1	January 16, 1995 (age 31)	Olongapo City Council	June 30, 2025
Ormoc		Carmelo Locsin Jr.	PFP	1	October 30, 1974 (age 52)	Businessman Vice Mayor of Ormoc	June 30, 2025
Parañaque		Benjo Bernabe	PFP	1	March 21, 1975 (age 51)	Businessman Parañaque City Council	June 30, 2025
Pasay		Mark Calixto	Lakas	1	February 12, 1976 (age 50)	Pasay City Council	June 30, 2025
Pasig		Robert Jaworski Jr.	Independent	2	October 14, 1971 (age 55)	Businessman, basketball player House of Representatives San Juan Municipal Council	June 30, 2022
Pateros (list)		Carlo Santos	PFP	2	July 25, 1975 (age 51)	Businessman, engineer	June 30, 2022
Puerto Princesa		Jimbo Maristela	Liberal	1	December 4, 1967 (age 58)	Lawyer Puerto Princesa City Council	June 30, 2025
Quezon City		Gian Sotto	SBP	3	March 18, 1978 (age 48)	Actor, entrepreneur Quezon City Council	June 30, 2019
San Juan		Angelo Agcaoili	PFP	1	March 16, 1973 (age 53)	Lawyer San Juan City Council	June 26, 2023 (Note: Angelo Agcaoili assumed office on June 26, 2023, after Warren Villa died.)
Santiago		Jamayne Tan	Lakas	1	May 4, 1992 (age 34)	Businesswoman	June 30, 2025
Tacloban		Raymund Romualdez	Nacionalista	1	March 18, 1987 (age 39)	Businessman Tacloban Association of Barangay Captains President	June 30, 2025
Taguig		Arvin Ian Alit	Nacionalista	2	December 21, 1976 (age 49)	Taguig City Council	June 30, 2022
Valenzuela		Marlon Alejandrino	NPC	1	August 21, 1982 (age 44)	Businessman Valenzuela City Council	June 30, 2025
Zamboanga City		Beng Climaco	AZAP	1	September 7, 1966 (age 60)	Teacher Mayor of Zamboanga City House of Representatives Vice Mayor of Zamboanga City Zamboanga City Council	June 30, 2025

== See also ==
- Politics of the Philippines
