= 2025 Davao City local elections =

25th city elections in Davao City

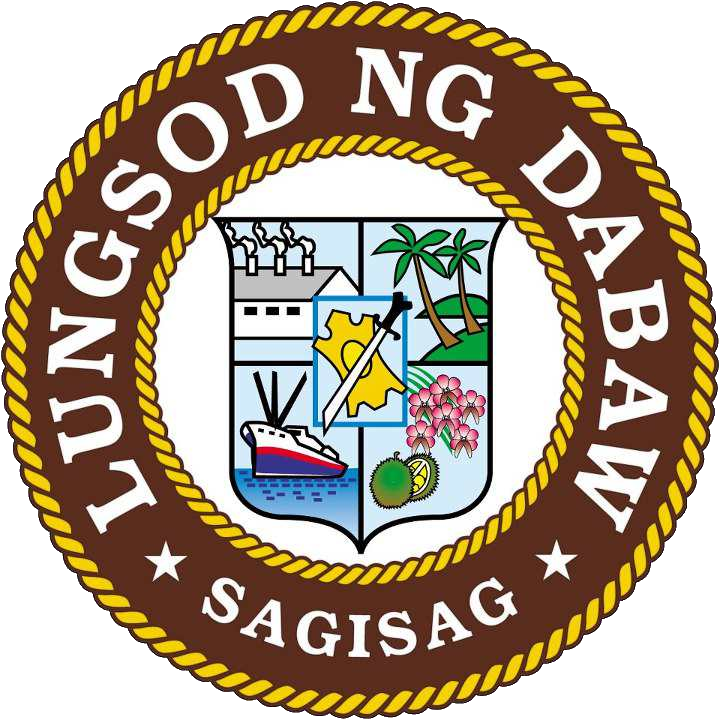
- May 12, 2025
- Mayoral election
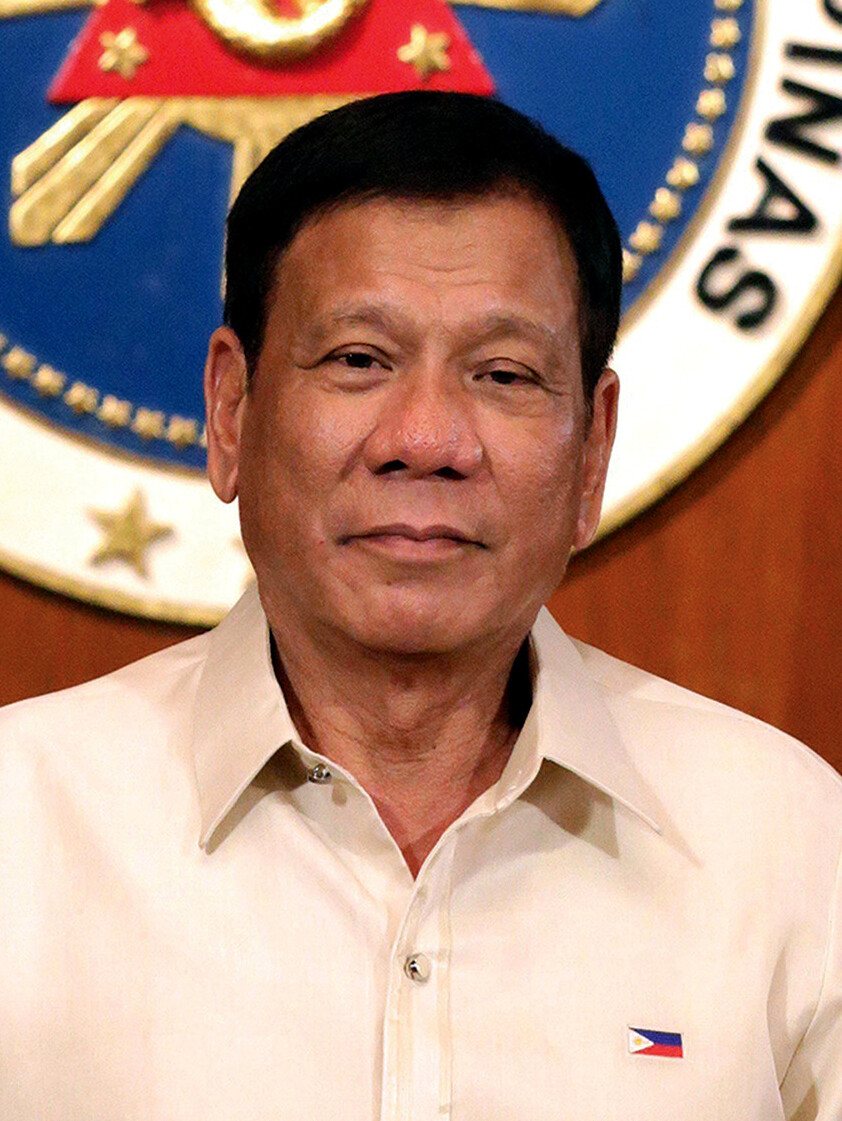

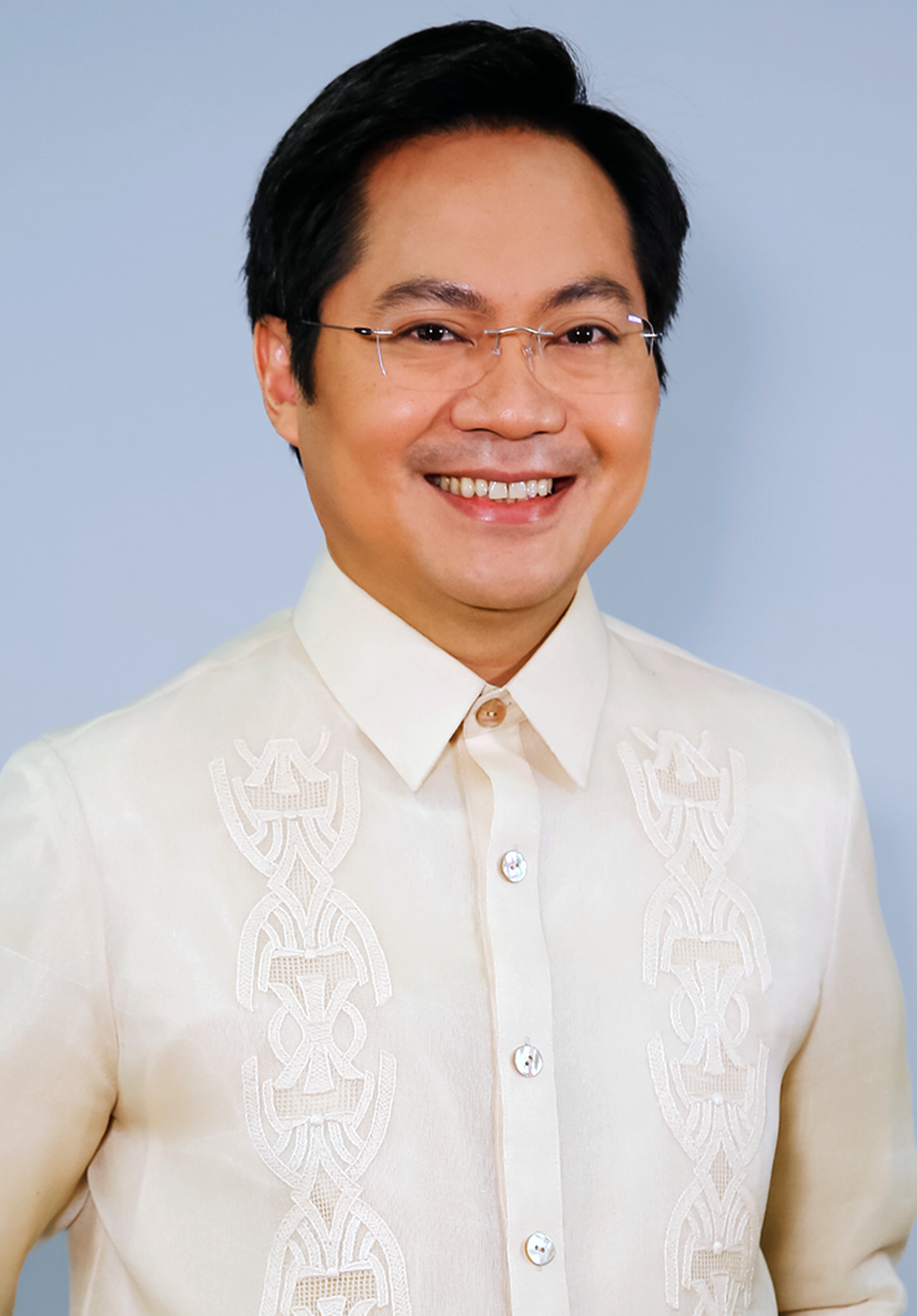
Candidate	Rodrigo Duterte	Karlo Nograles
Party	Hugpong	Independent
Alliance	DuterTen	Bagong Pilipinas
Popular vote	662,630	80,852
Percentage	87.91%	10.73%
Mayor before election
Sebastian Duterte
Hugpong
Elected mayor
Rodrigo Duterte
Hugpong
- Vice mayoral election
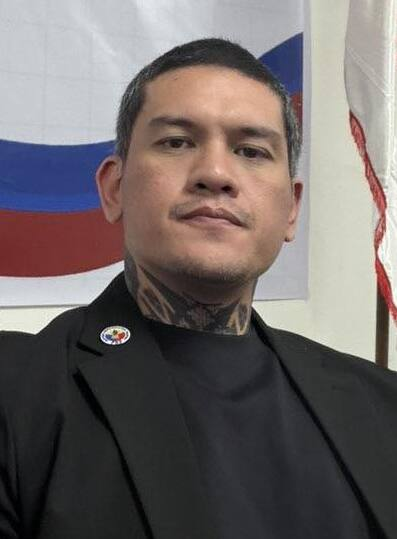

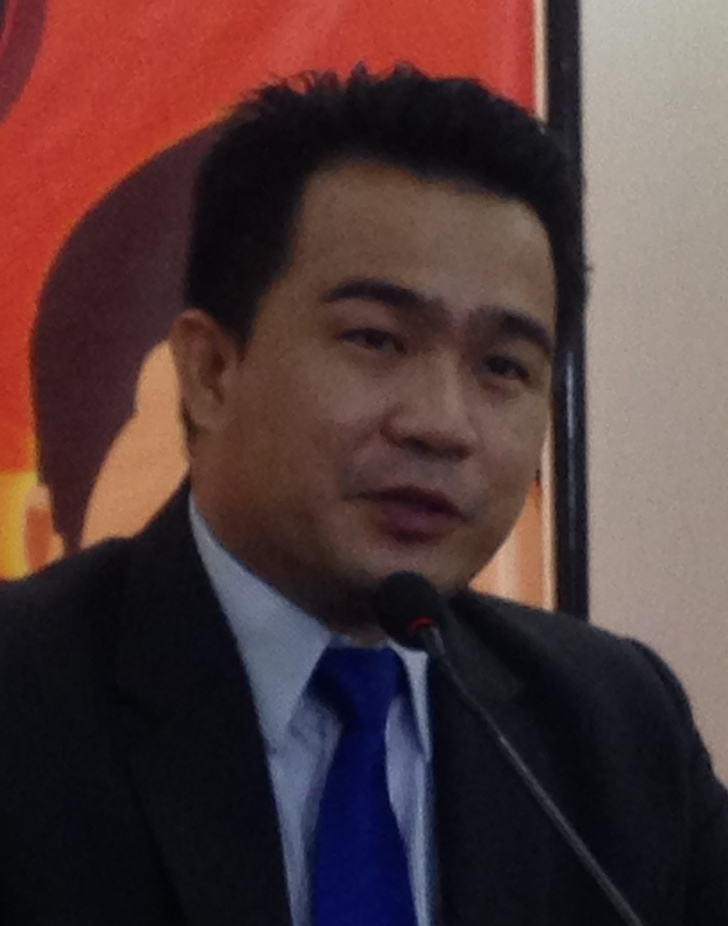
Candidate	Sebastian Duterte	Bernard Al-ag
Party	Hugpong	Independent
Alliance	DuterTen	Bagong Pilipinas
Popular vote	651,356	78,893
Percentage	88.33%	10.70%
Vice Mayor before election
Jesus Melchor Quitain Jr.
Hugpong
Elected Vice Mayor
Sebastian Duterte
Hugpong

Local elections were held in Davao City on May 12, 2025, as part of the 2025 Philippine general election. The city electorate elected a mayor, a vice mayor, 24 members of the Davao City Council, and three district representatives to the House of Representatives.

The elections were notable for featuring the political comeback of former President Rodrigo Duterte, who was seeking to return to the post he had previously held for over 22 years, despite awaiting trial in The Hague for crimes against humanity for his role in the Philippine drug war.

== Background ==
Davao City, the largest city in Mindanao, the third most populous urban center in the Philippines and the largest city by land area, has been ruled by the Duterte family for most of the past four decades. The city has served as the political base for the dynasty since the first post-EDSA elections in 1988, when Rodrigo Duterte was first elected city mayor.

The 2025 elections mark a significant political development as incumbent mayor Sebastian Duterte chose not to seek reelection, instead running for vice mayor. This decision paved the way for his father, the former president, to seek a return to City Hall after serving as president from 2016 to 2022.

After Duterte's arrest by the International Criminal Court in March 2025, the Commission on Elections stated that Duterte could still be proclaimed as mayor in absentia should he win the mayoral race, even if he is still in detention at The Hague, Netherlands. The Department of the Interior and Local Government will decide if Duterte has the capability to fulfill his role while in detention overseas.

== Electoral system ==
Local elections in the Philippines are held every second Monday of May, every three years starting in 1992. Single-seat positions (mayor, vice mayor and district representative) are elected via first-past-the-post-voting. The mayor and vice mayor are elected by the city at-large, while the House representative and city councilors are elected per district.

City council elections are done via plurality block voting; for the Davao City Council, the city is divided into three districts, with each district sending eight councilors. There are two other ex officio seats representing the Sangguniang Kabataan Federation and the Association of Barangay Captains; these will be determined later following the barangay and Sangguniang Kabataan elections.

== Candidates ==
=== Administration coalition ===
Team Duterte
Position	#	Candidate	Party
Mayor	2.	Rodrigo Duterte	Hugpong
Vice mayor	3.	Sebastian Duterte	Hugpong
1st district representative	1.	Paolo Duterte	Hugpong
1st district councilor	2.	Luna Acosta	HNP
1st district councilor	5.	Cookie Bonguyan	Hugpong
1st district councilor	6.	TJ Corsino	Hugpong
1st district councilor	10.	Rodrigo Duterte II	Hugpong
1st district councilor	13.	Ragde Niño Ibuyan	Hugpong
1st district councilor	16.	Pameng Librado	Hugpong
1st district councilor	18.	Bonz Militar	Hugpong
1st district councilor	19.	Tek Ocampo	Hugpong
1st district councilor	20.	Jesus Melchor Quitain Jr.	Hugpong
2nd district representative	2.	Omar Duterte	Hugpong
2nd district councilor	1.	Ralph Opsima Abella	PDP
2nd district councilor	3.	Al Ryan Alejandre	Hugpong
2nd district councilor	4.	Laude Apostol	PDP
2nd district councilor	6.	Louie John Bonguyan	Hugpong
2nd district councilor	7.	Nilo Cabiles	PDP
2nd district councilor	8.	Nonong Cabling	PDP
2nd district councilor	12.	Danilo Dayanghirang	Hugpong
2nd district councilor	13.	Jonard Dayap	Hugpong
2nd district councilor	14.	Jimmy Dureza	PDP
2nd district councilor	18.	Che Che Justol	Hugpong
2nd district councilor	19.	Diosdado Mahipus	Hugpong
2nd district councilor	20.	Dayang Orcullo	PDP
2nd district councilor	24.	Allan Simo-ag	PDP
3rd district representative	5.	Isidro Ungab	Hugpong
3rd district councilor	1.	Sweet Advincula	Hugpong
3rd district councilor	3.	Jopet Baluran	Hugpong
3rd district councilor	4.	Abay Bargamento	PDP
3rd district councilor	8.	Bebot Clarion	PDP
3rd district councilor	9.	Myrna Dalodo Ortiz	Hugpong
3rd district councilor	15.	Rodolfo Mande	PDP
3rd district councilor	22.	Petite Principe	Hugpong
3rd district councilor	24.	Alberto Ungab	Hugpong
3rd district councilor	25.	Enzo Villafuerte	PDP
3rd district councilor	26.	Potpot Villafuerte	Hugpong
3rd district councilor	27.	Rachel Zozobrado	Hugpong

=== Opposition coalition ===
Team Nograles-Al-Ag
Position	#	Candidate	Party
Mayor	4.	Karlo Nograles	Independent
Vice mayor	1.	Bernard Al-ag	Independent
1st district representative	5.	Migs Nograles	Independent
1st district councilor	1.	Nilo Abellera Jr.	PFP
1st district councilor	4.	Cherry Al-ag	Independent
1st district councilor	11.	Priscilla Galope	Lakas
1st district councilor	17.	Eking Liparanon	Lakas
2nd district representative	1.	Javi Garcia Campos	PFP
2nd district councilor	5.	Janel Banzon	PFP
2nd district councilor	21.	Mac Quilaneta	Lakas
2nd district councilor	23.	Pao Salvador	PFP
3rd district representative	1.	Wilberto Al-ag	Lakas
3rd district councilor	2.	Momay Al-ag	Lakas
3rd district councilor	12.	Larry Franco	PFP
3rd district councilor	20.	Jetjet Pantig	Independent

=== Others ===
Partido Federal ng Pilipinas
Position	#	Name	Party
3rd district representative	2.	Ruy Elias Lopez	PFP

Workers' and Peasants' Party
Position	#	Name	Party
Mayor	3.	Jonathan Julaine	WPP

Independents
Position	#	Name	Party
Mayor	1.	Rod Cubos	Independent
Mayor	5.	Joselito Tan	Independent
Vice mayor	2.	Richard Alcebar	Independent
Vice mayor	4.	Oyie Soriano-Barcena	Independent
1st district representative	2.	Janeth Jabines	Independent
1st district representative	3.	Rex Labis	Independent
1st district representative	4.	Mags Maglana	Independent
1st district councilor	3.	Mary Jane Aguinaldo	Independent
1st district councilor	7.	Archie Cubos	Independent
1st district councilor	8.	Kariz Cubos-Martinez	Independent
1st district councilor	9.	Jen-Jen Dulla	Independent
1st district councilor	12.	Franz Gonzales	Independent
1st district councilor	14.	Ojeng Jabines	Independent
1st district councilor	15.	Bong Javier	Independent
1st district councilor	21.	Alvin Roy	Independent
1st district councilor	22.	Antonette Sabes	Independent
1st district councilor	23.	Bitoy Villasis	Independent
2nd district representative	3.	Melogen Montesclaros	Independent
2nd district councilor	2.	Mary Crystel Abrenica	Independent
2nd district councilor	9.	Venz Cañonera	Independent
2nd district councilor	10.	Regidor Cortez	Independent
2nd district councilor	11.	Keith Corton	Independent
2nd district councilor	15.	Tony Emberda	Independent
2nd district councilor	16.	Yang Felipas	Independent
2nd district councilor	17.	Felochie Gencianos	Independent
2nd district councilor	22.	Henry Respecia	Independent
2nd district councilor	25.	Erwin Uy	Independent
3rd district representative
3rd district representative	3.	Lito Monreal	Independent
3rd district representative	4.	Dindo Plaza	Independent
3rd district councilor	5.	Ramil Fernando Brucal	Independent
3rd district councilor	6.	Michael Cabalhin	Independent
3rd district councilor	7.	Ricky Castillote	Independent
3rd district councilor	10.	Efren Desierto	Independent
3rd district councilor	11.	Julie Leah Echalico	Independent
3rd district councilor	13.	Daniel Guillen	Independent
3rd district councilor	14.	Junrich Sumile Malolot	Independent
3rd district councilor	16.	Manuel Mendoza	Independent
3rd district councilor	17.	Carmela Merquita	Independent
3rd district councilor	18.	Leonara Digna Naraval	Independent
3rd district councilor	19.	Luis Narisma	Independent
3rd district councilor	21.	Exequiel Placio	Independent
3rd district councilor	23.	Rowena Soriano-Donato	Independent

== Mayoral election ==
Despite his detention at The Hague, Rodrigo Duterte was proclaimed winner of the mayoral election by COMELEC Davao City on May 13, 2025. The commission does not require winning candidates to be present during the proclamation ceremony.

=== Candidates ===
- Rod Cubos (Independent)
- Rodrigo Duterte (Hugpong sa Tawong Lungsod), president of the Philippines (2016–2022) and mayor of Davao City (1988–1998, 2001–2010, 2013–2016)
- Jonathan Julaine (Workers' and Peasants' Party)
- Karlo Nograles (Independent), chair of Civil Service Commission (2022–2024) and 1st district representative (2010–2018)
- Joselito Tan (Independent)

=== Results ===
Candidate	Party	Votes	%
Rodrigo Duterte	Hugpong sa Tawong Lungsod	662,630	87.91
Karlo Nograles	Independent	80,852	10.73
Rod Cubos	Independent	7,757	1.03
Jonathan Julaine	Workers' and Peasants' Party	1,351	0.18
Joselito Tan	Independent	1,139	0.15
Total		753,729	100.00

== Vice mayoral election ==
=== Candidates ===
- Bernard Al-ag (Independent), incumbent city councilor from the 1st district (2022–present)
- Richard Alcebar (Independent)
- Sebastian Duterte (Hugpong sa Tawong Lungsod), incumbent mayor of Davao City (2022–present)
- Oyie Soriano-Barcena (Independent)

=== Results ===
Candidate	Party	Votes	%
Sebastian Duterte	Hugpong sa Tawong Lungsod	651,356	88.33
Bernard Al-ag	Independent	78,893	10.70
Oyie Soriano-Barcena	Independent	5,219	0.71
Richard Marcos Alcebar	Independent	1,924	0.26
Total		737,392	100.00

== Congressional elections ==
=== First district ===
Incumbent Paolo Duterte is running for re-election to a third term. His opponents are PBA Partylist Representative Migs Nograles and independent candidates Janeth Jabines, Rex Labis and Mags Maglana.

==== Candidates ====
- Paolo Duterte (Hugpong sa Tawong Lungsod), incumbent representative from Davao City's 1st district (2019–present)
- Janeth Jabines (Independent)
- Rex Labis (Independent)
- Mags Maglana (Independent)
- Migs Nograles (Independent), incumbent representative for PBA Partylist (2022–present)

==== Results ====
Candidate	Party	Votes	%
Paolo Duterte	Hugpong sa Tawong Lungsod	203,557	78.75
Migs Nograles	Independent	49,186	19.03
Mags Maglana	Independent	3,530	1.37
Janeth Jabines	Independent	1,870	0.72
Rex Labis	Independent	331	0.13
Total		258,474	100.00

=== Second district ===
Incumbent Vincent Garcia is eligible to a third term but did not seek re-election. He fielded his nephew, city councilor Javi Garcia Campos, to succeed him. His opponents are Omar Duterte, son of 1st district representative Paolo Duterte, and independent candidate Melogen Montesclaros.

==== Candidates ====
- Javi Garcia Campos (Partido Federal ng Pilipinas), incumbent city councilor from the 2nd district (2019–present)
- Omar Duterte (Hugpong sa Tawong Lungsod), incumbent barangay chairman of Buhangin, Davao City (2023–present)
- Melogen Montesclaros (Independent)

==== Results ====
Candidate	Party	Votes	%
Omar Duterte	Hugpong sa Tawong Lungsod	160,432	63.54
Javi Garcia Campos	Partido Federal ng Pilipinas	90,156	35.71
Melogen Montesclaros	Independent	1,895	0.75
Total		252,483	100.00

=== Third district ===
Incumbent Isidro Ungab is running for re-election to a third term. His opponents are 3rd district councilor Nonoy Al-ag, former representative Ruy Elias Lopez, and independent candidates Lito Monreal and Dindo Plaza.

==== Candidates ====
- Nonoy Al-ag (Lakas–CMD), incumbent city councilor from the 3rd district (2019–present)
- Ruy Elias Lopez (Partido Federal ng Pilipinas), former representative from Davao City's 3rd district (1998–2007) and 2022 candidate for mayor of Davao City
- Lito Monreal (Independent)
- Dindo Plaza (Independent)
- Isidro Ungab (Hugpong sa Tawong Lungsod), incumbent representative from Davao City's 3rd district (2019–present)

==== Results ====
Candidate	Party	Votes	%
Isidro Ungab	Hugpong sa Tawong Lungsod	178,721	77.57
Nonoy Al-ag	Lakas–CMD	30,687	13.32
Ruy Elias Lopez	Partido Federal ng Pilipinas	19,243	8.35
Lito Monreal	Independent	1,133	0.49
Dindo Plaza	Independent	612	0.27
Total		230,396	100.00

== City Council elections ==
Party	Votes	%	Seats
Hugpong sa Tawong Lungsod	2,906,265	60.83	19
Partido Demokratiko Pilipino	1,110,253	23.24	4
Lakas–CMD	171,741	3.59	0
Hugpong ng Pagbabago	165,173	3.46	1
Partido Federal ng Pilipinas	133,695	2.80	0
Independent	290,701	6.08	0
Ex officio seats			2
Reserved seats			1
Total	4,777,828	100.00	27
HTL becomes largest party			

=== First district ===
The first city council district, co-terminous with Davao City's 1st congressional district, is composed of the administrative districts of Poblacion and Talomo (54 barangays).

==== Results ====
Candidate	Party	Votes	%
Rodrigo Duterte II	Hugpong sa Tawong Lungsod	192,324	11.71
Jesus Melchor Quitain Jr.	Hugpong sa Tawong Lungsod	175,474	10.68
Luna Acosta	Hugpong ng Pagbabago	165,173	10.05
Cookie Bonguyan	Hugpong sa Tawong Lungsod	153,308	9.33
Bonz Militar	Hugpong sa Tawong Lungsod	150,626	9.17
Ragde Niño Ibuyan	Hugpong sa Tawong Lungsod	148,474	9.04
Tek Ocampo	Hugpong sa Tawong Lungsod	145,299	8.84
Pameng Librado	Hugpong sa Tawong Lungsod	132,709	8.08
TJ Corsino	Hugpong sa Tawong Lungsod	103,074	6.27
Nilo Abellera Jr.	Partido Federal ng Pilipinas	60,560	3.69
Cherry Al-ag	Independent	58,054	3.53
Priscilla Galope	Lakas–CMD	38,496	2.34
Eking Liparanon	Lakas–CMD	33,790	2.06
Archie Cubos	Independent	13,383	0.81
Bong Javier	Independent	13,289	0.81
Kariz Cubos-Martinez	Independent	10,310	0.63
Franz Gonzales	Independent	8,752	0.53
Mary Jane Aguinaldo	Independent	8,035	0.49
Ojeng Jabines	Independent	7,521	0.46
Jen-Jen Dulla	Independent	7,163	0.44
Alvin Roy	Independent	6,094	0.37
Antonette Sabes	Independent	6,040	0.37
Bitoy Villasis	Independent	5,018	0.31
Total		1,642,966	100.00

=== Second district ===
The second city council district, co-terminous with Davao City's 2nd congressional district, is composed of the administrative districts of Agdao, Buhangin, Bunawan and Paquibato (46 barangays).

==== Results ====
Candidate	Party	Votes	%
Diosdado Mahipus	Hugpong sa Tawong Lungsod	148,171	9.16
Ralph Opsima Abella	Partido Demokratiko Pilipino	148,070	9.15
Louie John Bonguyan	Hugpong sa Tawong Lungsod	136,994	8.47
Che Che Justol	Hugpong sa Tawong Lungsod	136,078	8.41
Al Ryan Alejandre	Hugpong sa Tawong Lungsod	129,868	8.03
Danilo Dayanghirang	Hugpong sa Tawong Lungsod	124,065	7.67
Nonong Cabling	Partido Demokratiko Pilipino	115,481	7.14
Doce Apostol	Partido Demokratiko Pilipino	112,625	6.96
Jonard Dayap	Hugpong sa Tawong Lungsod	106,815	6.60
Jimmy Dureza	Partido Demokratiko Pilipino	91,935	5.68
Allan Simo-ag	Partido Demokratiko Pilipino	83,453	5.16
Nilo Cabiles	Partido Demokratiko Pilipino	80,243	4.96
Dayang Orcullo	Partido Demokratiko Pilipino	55,869	3.45
Mac Quilaneta	Lakas–CMD	49,955	3.09
Pao Salvador	Partido Federal ng Pilipinas	31,925	1.97
Janel Banzon	Partido Federal ng Pilipinas	20,501	1.27
Mary Crystel Abrenica	Independent	9,722	0.60
Regidor Cortez	Independent	7,925	0.49
Erwin Uy	Independent	6,196	0.38
Yang Felipas	Independent	4,022	0.25
Henry Respecia	Independent	3,820	0.24
Tony Emberda	Independent	3,743	0.23
Keith Corton	Independent	3,571	0.22
Felochie Gencianos	Independent	3,256	0.20
Venz Cañonera	Independent	3,233	0.20
Total		1,617,536	100.00

=== Third district ===
The third city council district, co-terminous with Davao City's 3rd congressional district, is composed of the administrative districts of Baguio, Calinan, Marilog, Toril and Tugbok (82 barangays).

==== Results ====
Candidate	Party	Votes	%
Alberto Ungab	Hugpong sa Tawong Lungsod	153,433	10.10
Enzo Villafuerte	Partido Demokratiko Pilipino	144,270	9.50
Sweet Advincula	Hugpong sa Tawong Lungsod	137,001	9.02
Petite Principe	Hugpong sa Tawong Lungsod	129,490	8.52
Rachel Zozobrado	Hugpong sa Tawong Lungsod	129,292	8.51
Potpot Villafuerte	Hugpong sa Tawong Lungsod	128,425	8.45
Jopet Baluran	Hugpong sa Tawong Lungsod	125,895	8.29
Myrna Dalodo-Ortiz	Hugpong sa Tawong Lungsod	121,076	7.97
Abay Bargamento	Partido Demokratiko Pilipino	100,110	6.59
Bebot Clarion	Partido Demokratiko Pilipino	89,598	5.90
Rodolfo Mande	Partido Demokratiko Pilipino	88,599	5.83
Momay Al-ag	Lakas–CMD	49,500	3.26
Jetjet Pantig	Independent	39,845	2.62
Larry Franco	Partido Federal ng Pilipinas	20,709	1.36
Carmela Merquita	Independent	7,357	0.48
Rowena Soriano-Donato	Independent	6,684	0.44
Ramil Fernando Brucal	Independent	6,122	0.40
Efren Desierto	Independent	5,975	0.39
Julie Leah Echalico	Independent	5,114	0.34
Manuel Mendoza	Independent	4,842	0.32
Michael Cabalhin	Independent	4,614	0.30
Leonara Digna Naraval	Independent	4,500	0.30
Junrich Sumile Malolot	Independent	4,288	0.28
Ricky Castillote	Independent	3,725	0.25
Daniel Guillen	Independent	2,879	0.19
Exequiel Placio	Independent	2,833	0.19
Luis Narisma	Independent	2,776	0.18
Total		1,518,952	100.00

== Aftermath ==
Upon the start of their terms on June 30, 2025, amidst mayor-elect Rodrigo Duterte's continued detention at The Hague that prevented him from taking the oath of office, vice mayor-elect Sebastian Duterte became the acting mayor, while 1st district councilor-elect Rigo Duterte, who had received the most number of votes for councilor in the entire city, became the acting vice mayor. Rodrigo Duterte ultimately failed to take his oath within the prescribed six-month period. As a result, Sebastian and Rigo Duterte were sworn in as the permanent mayor and vice mayor, respectively, on January 23, 2026. Rigo’s ascension to the vice mayoralty left a vacancy in the Davao City Council.
