= Isidro Ungab =

Filipino politician (born 1961)

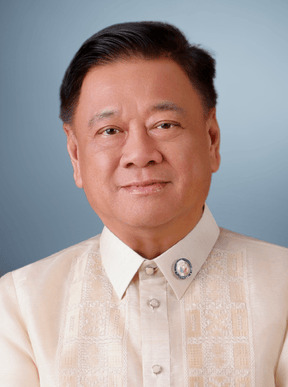
- Official portrait, 2025

Deputy Speaker of the House of Representatives of the Philippines
- In office July 25, 2022 – November 7, 2023
- House Speaker: Martin Romualdez
- Succeeded by: Yasser Balindong
- In office December 16, 2020 – June 1, 2022
- House Speaker: Lord Allan Velasco

Member of the Philippine House of Representatives from Davao City's 3rd congressional district
- Incumbent
- Assumed office June 30, 2019
- Preceded by: Alberto Ungab
- In office June 30, 2007 – June 30, 2016
- Preceded by: Ruy Elias Lopez
- Succeeded by: Alberto Ungab

Member of Davao City Council from the 3rd district
- In office June 30, 1995 – June 30, 2004

Personal details
- Born: May 8, 1961 (age 65) Davao City, Philippines
- Party: HTL (2024–present)
- Other political affiliations: Lakas (2022–2024); HNP (2018–2022); PDP–Laban (2016–2018); Liberal (2009–2016); PMP (2003–2009); LAMMP (1998–2000); NPC (1995–2003)
- Education: University of the Philippines Los Baños (BS); Asian Institute of Management (ABMP); Development Academy of the Philippines (MPA)
- Military career
- Allegiance: Philippines
- Branch: Philippine Army
- Service years: 2008–present
- Rank: Colonel

Isidro Tom Ungab (born May 8, 1961) is a Filipino politician serving as the representative of the Third District of Davao City in the House of Representatives of the Philippines since 2019, a position he previously held from 2007 to 2016. He previously served as Deputy Speaker of the House of Representatives of the Philippines from 2020 to 2022 and again from 2022 to 2023.

== Early life and education ==
Ungab was born on May 8, 1961, in Davao City, Philippines. He earned a degree in Agricultural Economics from the University of the Philippines Los Baños. He also attended the Asian Institute of Management and the Development Academy of the Philippines, obtaining further training in management and public administration.

== Political career ==
Ungab began his political career as a councilor in Davao City from 1995 to 2004. He ran for vice mayor of Davao City in 2004, but lost the elections. In 2007, he was elected as the representative of the Third District of Davao City, serving until 2016. After a brief hiatus, he returned to Congress in 2019. During his tenure, he chaired the powerful Committee on Appropriations and later served as Deputy Speaker.

In the 2019 Philippine general election, Ungab ran unopposed under the regional party Hugpong ng Pagbabago, founded by then-Mayor Sara Duterte.

In 2024, he switched allegiance to Hugpong sa Tawong Lungsod, the local party founded by former President Rodrigo Duterte. Upon the opening of the 20th Congress, he became part of the independent Davao-based bloc alongside fellow Davao City representatives Paolo Duterte and Omar Duterte and PPP representative Harold Duterte.

=== Legal challenge to the 2025 budget ===
In February 2025, Ungab announced plans to challenge the 2025 General Appropriations Act (GAA) before the Supreme Court. He raised concerns over how alleged blanks in the bicameral conference committee report were filled before finalizing the national budget law.

== Personal life ==
Ungab is the brother of former congressman Alberto Ungab. Before entering politics, he worked as a bank manager, economic analyst, and account officer.

Preceded by Ruy Elias Lopez	Representative, 3rd District of Davao City; 2007–2016	Succeeded by Alberto Ungab
Preceded by Alberto Ungab	Representative, 3rd District of Davao City; 2016–present	Incumbent
