= Rigo Duterte =

Vice Mayor of Davao City (born 1998)

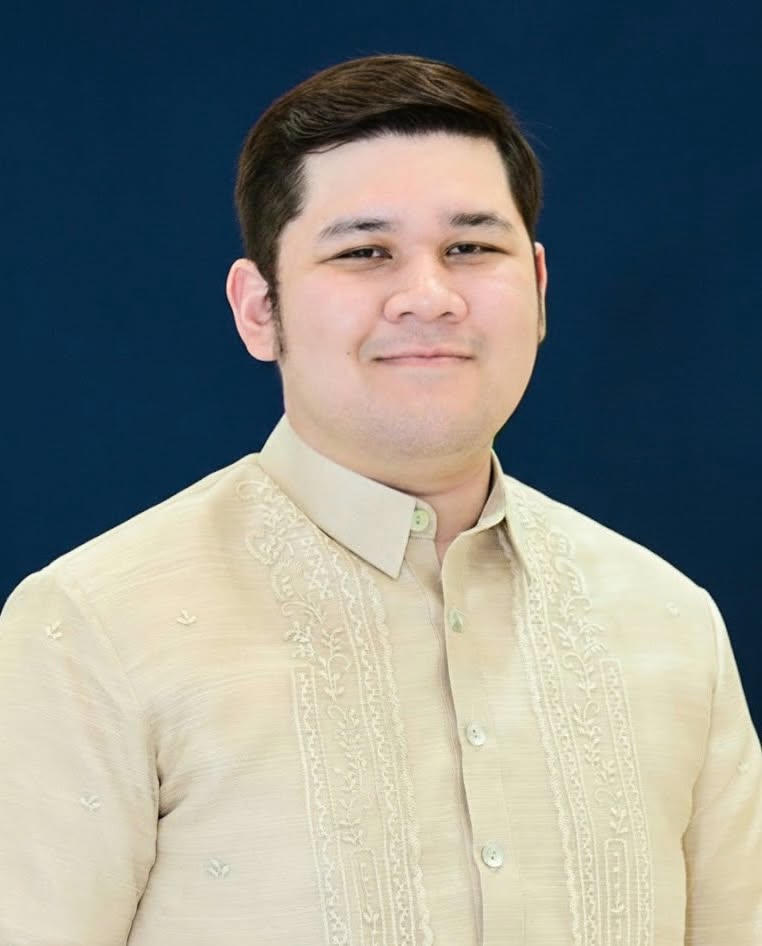
- Official portrait, 2026

15th Vice Mayor of Davao City
- Incumbent
- Assumed office June 30, 2025 (Note: Acting until January 23, 2026)
- Mayor: Sebastian Duterte
- Preceded by: Sebastian Duterte

Personal details
- Born: Rodrigo Sangkola Duterte II; February 23, 1998 (age 28) Davao City, Philippines
- Party: HTL (since 2024)
- Spouse: Yssa Marie Labrador (m. 2022)
- Children: 1
- Parent(s): Paolo Duterte (father); Lovelie Sangkola (mother)
- Relatives: Duterte family
- Education: University of Mindanao (BA)
- Occupation: Politician; businessman
- Website: Official website

Rodrigo "Rigo" Sangkola Duterte II (born February 23, 1998) is a Filipino businessman and politician who is the current Vice Mayor of Davao City since 2025, in which he also had served in acting capacity until 2026. He is the grandson of former President Rodrigo Duterte and the son of Davao City's 1st district representative Paolo Duterte. Duterte is also the younger brother of Davao City's 2nd district representative Omar Duterte.

== Early life and education ==
Duterte was born on February 23, 1998, in Davao City, Philippines to Paolo Duterte and Lovelie Sangkola. Duterte's older brother is Omar (born 1994) and his younger sister is Isabelle (born 2000). Duterte is the grandson of former Philippine president Rodrigo Duterte and Elizabeth Zimmerman. He graduated from the University of Mindanao in 2023 with a bachelor of arts degree of Political Science.

== Political career ==
=== Election ===
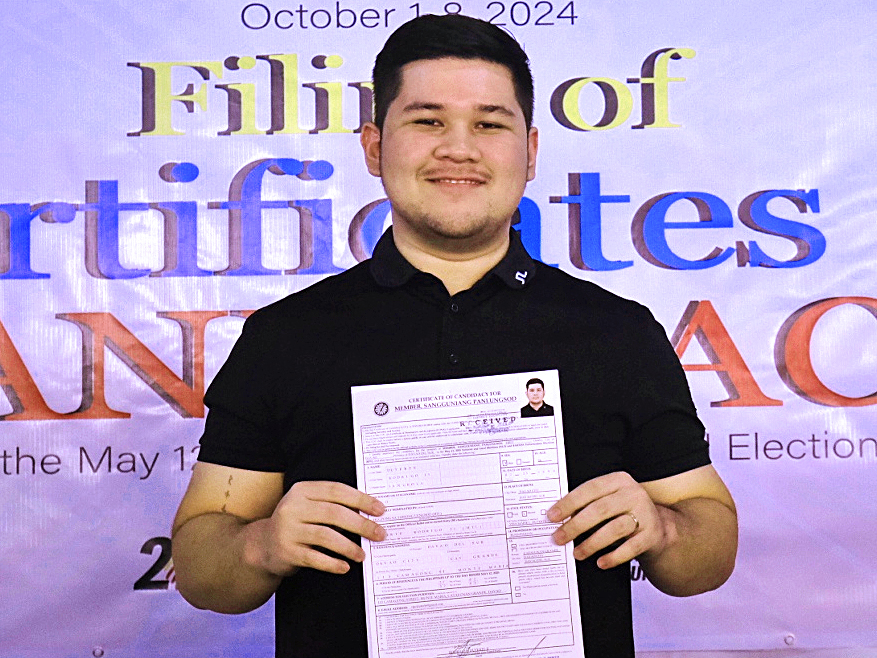
Duterte filing certificate of candidacy for Davao City Councilor on October 2, 2024.

On October 2, 2024, Duterte filed his candidacy to run for Councilor of the Davao City Council under Hugpong sa Tawong Lungsod from Davao City's 1st district and the first from the Duterte family to file candidacy. Before this, Duterte served as his father's chief of staff. On May 12, 2025, Duterte topped the election with 192,324 votes.

=== Vice Mayor of Davao City (2025–present) ===
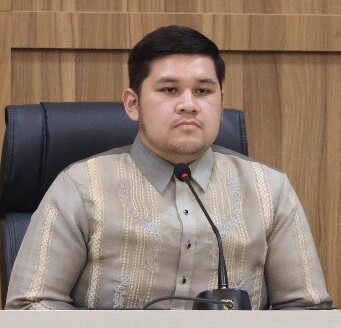
Duterte during inaugural session on July 1, 2025

On July 1, 2025, Duterte took over the role as the acting vice mayor of Davao City upon designation by the Department of the Interior and Local Government, as he was the most voted councilor in the previous election. Vice Mayor and uncle Sebastian Duterte became acting Mayor of Davao City because winner Rodrigo Duterte was unable to take oath due to his detention at the Hague.

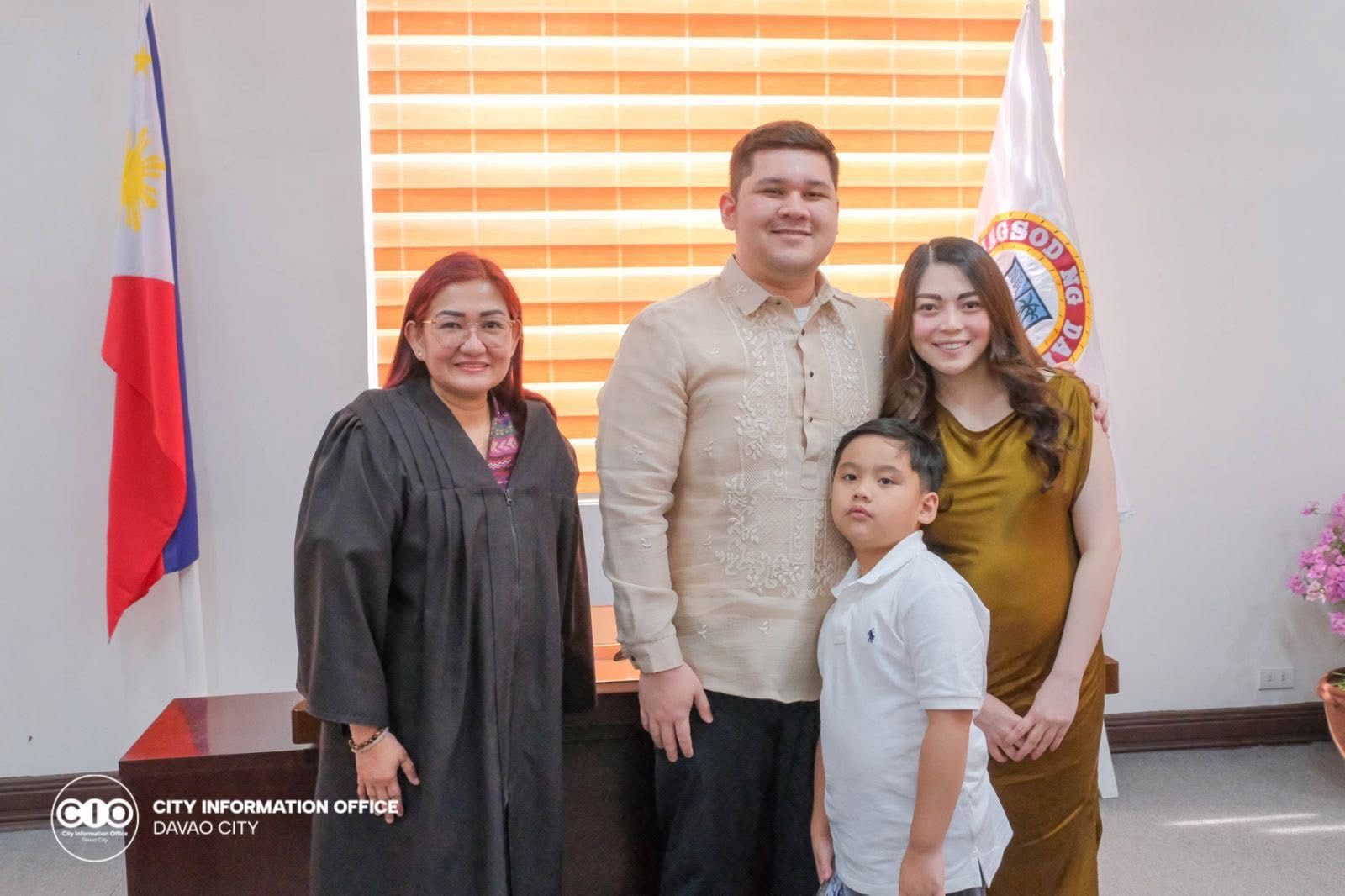
Duterte (left) with his wife, Yssa (upper right) and son, Rodrigo III (lower right) after his oath as vice mayor of Davao City on January 23, 2026.

On January 23, 2026, Rigo was sworn in as the de jure vice mayor after Rodrigo Duterte's failure to take the oath of office as mayor within the six-month prescribed period due to his continued detention at The Hague, which led to the vice mayoralty being also declared vacant upon the accession of Sebastian as the de jure mayor.

== Personal life ==
Duterte is married to Yssa Marie Duterte (née Labrador) since 2022 and have one child named Rodrigo III ("Tres", born 2019).

== Electoral history ==
Electoral history of Rigo Duterte
Year	Office	Party	Votes received				Result
Year	Office	Party	Total	%	P.	Swing	Result
2025	Councilor (Davao City–1st)	HTL	192,324	11.71%	1st	—N/a	Won
