= Omar Duterte =

Filipino businessman and politician (born 1994)

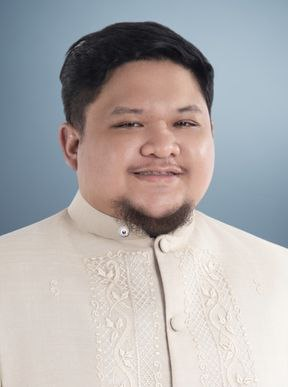
- Official portrait, 2025

Member of the Philippine House of Representatives from Davao City's 2nd congressional district
- Incumbent
- Assumed office June 30, 2025
- Preceded by: Vincent Garcia

Barangay Captain of Buhangin Proper, Davao City
- In office November 30, 2023 – June 29, 2025
- Preceded by: Francisco Gamad
- Succeeded by: Francisco Gamad

Personal details
- Born: Omar Vincent Sangkola Duterte; January 26, 1994 (age 32)
- Party: HTL (since 2024)
- Other political affiliations: Independent (2023–2024)
- Spouse: Jennifer Yamuta (m. 2019)
- Children: 3
- Parents: Paolo Duterte (father); Lovelie Sangkola (mother)
- Relatives: Duterte family
- Occupation: Politician, businessman

Omar Vincent Sangkola Duterte (born January 26, 1994) is a Filipino businessman and politician who has served as the representative for Davao City's 2nd district since 2025. He is the eldest son of Davao City 1st district Representative Paolo Duterte and first wife Lovelie Sangkola. His paternal grandparents are former Philippine President Rodrigo Duterte and Elizabeth Zimmerman.

== Early years ==
Duterte was born out of wedlock to 18-year-old Paolo Duterte and Lovelie Sangkola on January 26, 1994. Sangkola is Muslim, and Omar was raised in the Islamic faith. Their lot was provided by Sangkola's mother Ina. He has two younger siblings: Rodrigo II ("Rigo", born 1998) and Isabelle (born 2000), as well as two paternal half-siblings: Sabina (born 2006) and Paolo II ("Uno", born 2013).

After Omar's birth, Paolo left the Duterte family for more than five years without telling them about his child, which his father Rodrigo Duterte considered to be "[o]ne of my sad events in my life". Omar's parents would later separate in 2005, with their marriage annulled in a sharia court in 2006.

In 2020, during the COVID-19 pandemic lockdown, Duterte was involved in an incident at S&R Membership Shopping Davao, where he was accused of cutting a queue. He and his father later publicly apologized concerning the incident.

== Political career ==
=== Barangay politics (2023–2025) ===
Duterte's political career began as a barangay chairperson in Buhangin Proper, Davao City, when he was elected unopposed in 2023.

=== House of Representatives (2025–present) ===
In 2025, he was elected as the representative for Davao City's 2nd congressional district.

Upon the opening of the 20th Congress, he became part of the independent Davao-based bloc alongside his father Paolo Duterte (Davao City–1st), Harold Duterte (PPP), and Isidro Ungab (Davao City–3rd).

== Personal life ==
Duterte is married to Jennifer Yamuta since 2019. Together, they have a son named Godfrey Arturo Duterte, born in 2019 and a daughter named Ronika, born in 2021.

Duterte has a daughter named Mira (also known as "Mimi"), born in 2019 with his former girlfriend Juna Sugata.

== Electoral history ==
Electoral history of Omar Duterte
Year	Office	Party	Votes received				Result
Year	Office	Party	Total	%	P.	Swing	Result
2025	Representative (Davao City–2nd)	HTL	160,432	63.54%	1st	—N/a	Won

House of Representatives of the Philippines
Preceded by Vincent Garcia	Member of the House of Representatives from Davao City's 2nd district 2025–present	Incumbent
Political offices
Preceded by Francisco Gamad	Barangay Captain of Buhangin Proper, Davao City; 2023–2025	Succeeded by Francisco Gamad
