= Paolo Duterte =

Filipino businessman and politician (born 1975)

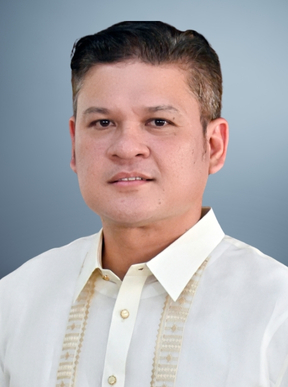
- Official portrait, 2025

Deputy Speaker of the Philippine House of Representatives
- In office July 22, 2019 – October 13, 2020 Serving with several others
- Leader: Alan Peter Cayetano

Member of the Philippine House of Representatives from Davao City's 1st congressional district
- Incumbent
- Assumed office June 30, 2019
- Preceded by: Karlo Nograles

12th Vice Mayor of Davao City
- In office June 30, 2013 – January 5, 2018
- Mayor: Rodrigo Duterte (2013–2016); Sara Duterte (2016–2018)
- Preceded by: Rodrigo Duterte
- Succeeded by: Bernard Al-ag (acting)

Member of the Davao City Council
- Ex officio
- In office January 6, 2008 – June 30, 2013
- Sector: Liga ng mga Barangay
Barangay positions
Vice President for Mindanao Liga ng mga Barangay National
In office July 2011 – June 2013
Barangay Captain of Catalunan Grande, Davao City
In office November 15, 2007 – June 30, 2013
Preceded by	Jesus Sabio
Succeeded by	January Navares-Duterte

Personal details
- Born: Paolo Zimmerman Duterte; March 24, 1975 (age 51) Davao City, Philippines
- Party: HTL (since 2012)
- Other political affiliations: NUP (2019–2021); HNP (2018–2024); Independent (2007–2012)
- Spouses: Lovelie Sangkola (ann. 2006) January Navares (m. 2010)
- Children: 5, including Omar and Rigo
- Parent(s): Rodrigo Duterte (father); Elizabeth Zimmerman (mother)
- Relatives: Duterte family
- Education: University of Mindanao (BA); University of Southeastern Philippines (MPA); Lyceum-Northwestern University (D.P.A)
- Website: Official website

Paolo "Pulong" Zimmerman Duterte (English: /dəˈtɜːrteɪ/; Tagalog: [dʊˈtɛɾtɛ]; born March 24, 1975) is a Filipino businessman and politician serving as the representative of Davao City's 1st district since 2019, and served as a House Deputy Speaker during the 18th Congress. Prior to his election to the House of Representatives, Duterte previously served as vice mayor of Davao City from 2013 until his resignation in December 2017, which was only recognized in January 2018.

Paolo Duterte is the eldest child of former mayor of Davao City and 16th Philippine president, Rodrigo Roa Duterte. His sister Sara is the incumbent Vice President of the Philippines, while his brother Sebastian is the incumbent Mayor of Davao City.

Duterte has been embroiled in various controversies. The Anti–Money Laundering Council (AMLC) has confirmed that Duterte received drug money from Chinese drug lord Sammy Uy between 2011 to 2013. His family received at least P181.6 million, where P38.81 million were specifically named under him, as confirmed by verified bank transactions. He has also been associated with the Chinese organized drug crime syndicate Triad, where it has been alleged that he has a back tattoo only Triad members are allowed to have. As district representative, he received funding for 13,917 flood control projects and a ₱51 billion fund, the largest fund for any district in the country provided by the national government. However, Davao city continued to have floods under his watch. In 2025, he was caught in a CCTV footage participating in human trafficking and using a knife to threaten a pimp for not giving him enough prostitutes.

== Early life and education ==
Paolo Zimmerman Duterte was born on March 24, 1975, at Davao Doctors Hospital in Davao City. He is the eldest son of then-lawyer Rodrigo Roa Duterte, who would later become Mayor and Congressman of Davao City and President, and Elizabeth Zimmerman, a Filipina of German American descent. His sister, Sara Duterte, is the incumbent Vice President of the Philippines.

For his elementary and secondary studies, Duterte studied at the Philippine Women's College of Davao, obtaining his high school diploma in 1991. In 1994, he left the Duterte family for five years after having his first child (Omar) with Sangkola, with his father admitting that his long absence was "one of my sad events in my life". He attended the University of Mindanao, where he obtained his bachelor's degree in Banking & Finance in 2002.

Duterte also had graduate studies at the University of Southeastern Philippines, where he attained his master's degree in Public Administration in 2009, and at the Lyceum-Northwestern University, where he attained his doctorate degree in Public Administration in 2015.

== Political career ==
=== Barangay politics (2007–2013) ===
Paolo Duterte started his career as a politician as a barangay captain of barangay Catalunan Grande in the district of Talomo in Davao City from November 15, 2007, to June 30, 2013. In the later part of his barangay captain stint from July 2011 to June 2013, Duterte was Vice President for Mindanao of the Liga ng mga Barangay sa Pilipinas - National (lit. 'Mindanao National Barangay League').

He was also part of the 15th and 16th Davao City Council as a sectoral representative of the Association of Barangay Captains (ABC) from January 6, 2008, to June 30, 2013.

Between 2011-2013, Duterte's family received at least P181.6 million of drug money from Chinese drug lord Sammy Uy, the economic adviser of his father Rodrigo Duterte. At least P38.81 million were specifically named under Paolo Duterte as confirmed by the Anti–Money Laundering Council (AMLC) and verified bank transactions.

=== Vice Mayor of Davao City (2013–2018) ===
He was elected as Davao City's Vice Mayor in the 2013 local elections assuming the post on June 30, 2013. He secured a second term in the 2016 local elections.

Duterte has been associated with the Chinese organized crime syndicate Triad, known for drug smuggling, human trafficking, and other crimes. It was alleged that his back has a tattoo which only Triad members are allowed to have. Various personalities have challenged Duterte to show his back to prove his innocence, however, Duterte refused multiple times, leading to suspicions.

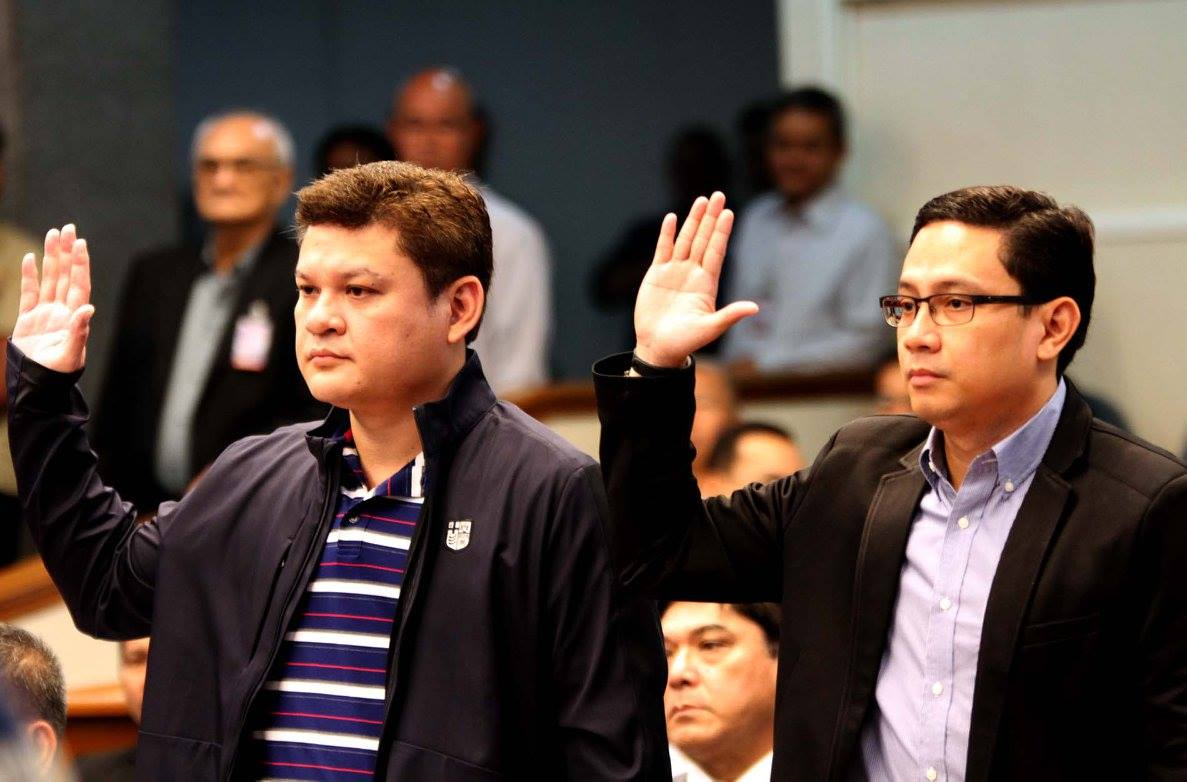
Duterte (left) and brother-in-law Mans Carpio (right) take their oaths before testifying in a Senate hearing on the ₱6.4-B shabu shipment on September 7, 2017.

In 2017, Duterte was allegedly linked by former Bureau of Customs (BOC) intelligence officer Jimmy Guban to the shipment of magnetic lifters containing ₱6 billion worth of crystal methamphetamine (shabu), allegations Duterte has strongly denied. In August 2024, former Senator Antonio Trillanes filed a complaint accusing Duterte, former BOC commissioner Nicanor Faeldon, lawyer Manases "Mans" Carpio, brother-in-law of Duterte, and seven others of committing conspiracy regarding the 2017 shipping incident during a House of Representative Inquiry in aid of legislation. Duterte welcomed the development saying that the “move will allow us to address these accusations through the proper legal channels, ensuring that the truth will prevail.”

Duterte later resigned as Vice Mayor of Davao City on December 25, 2017, saying the move was made out of "delicadeza" after his public quarrel with his daughter. This was attributed by Duterte to his "failed marriage" to Lovelie Sangkola describing his former wife as "incorrigible". He thanked the city council and remarked that he is looking forward to the day he is able to "serve the country again". Davao City Council Majority Floor Leader Bernard Al-ag became acting vice mayor upon recognition of his resignation by President Rodrigo Duterte on January 5, 2018.

=== House of Representatives (2019–present) ===
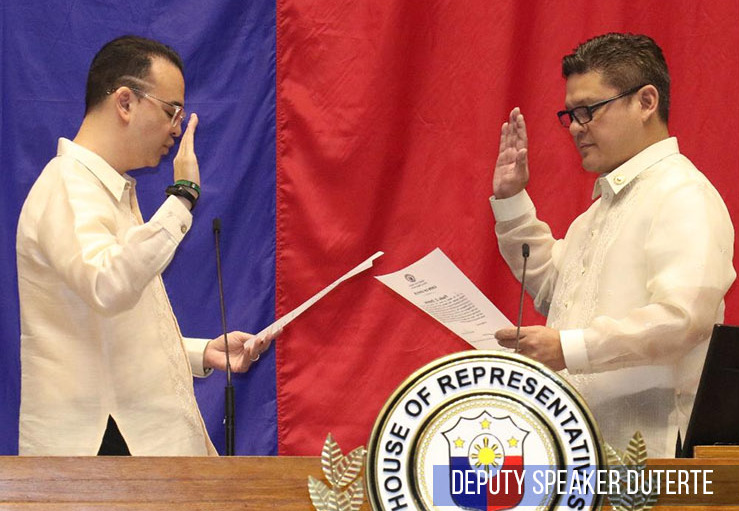
Duterte taking his oath of office as Deputy House Speaker on July 27, 2019

On October 12, 2018, Duterte filed his candidacy for congressman representing Davao City's 1st congressional district. He was proclaimed the winner by the Commission on Elections on May 14, 2019, and took his oath of office on June 21. In July, he was elected Deputy Speaker of the House for Political Affairs. Some of the bills he authored or co-authored as a congressman includes the creation of a Boracay Island Development Authority, the renaming of Ninoy Aquino International Airport, and the setting up of various department-level government agencies in charge of disaster resilience, OFWs and emergency response.

In 2020, Duterte was among the 70 representatives who voted to permanently deny the renewal of broadcasting franchise of television network ABS-CBN. He was reelected to his second consecutive term as congressman via landslide victory in 2022. Duterte was re-elected to his third and final consecutive term in 2025.

On July 31, 2024, former Senator Antonio Trillanes filed a drug smuggling and corruption complaint to the Department of Justice against Duterte, his brother-in-law Mans Carpio, and eight others.

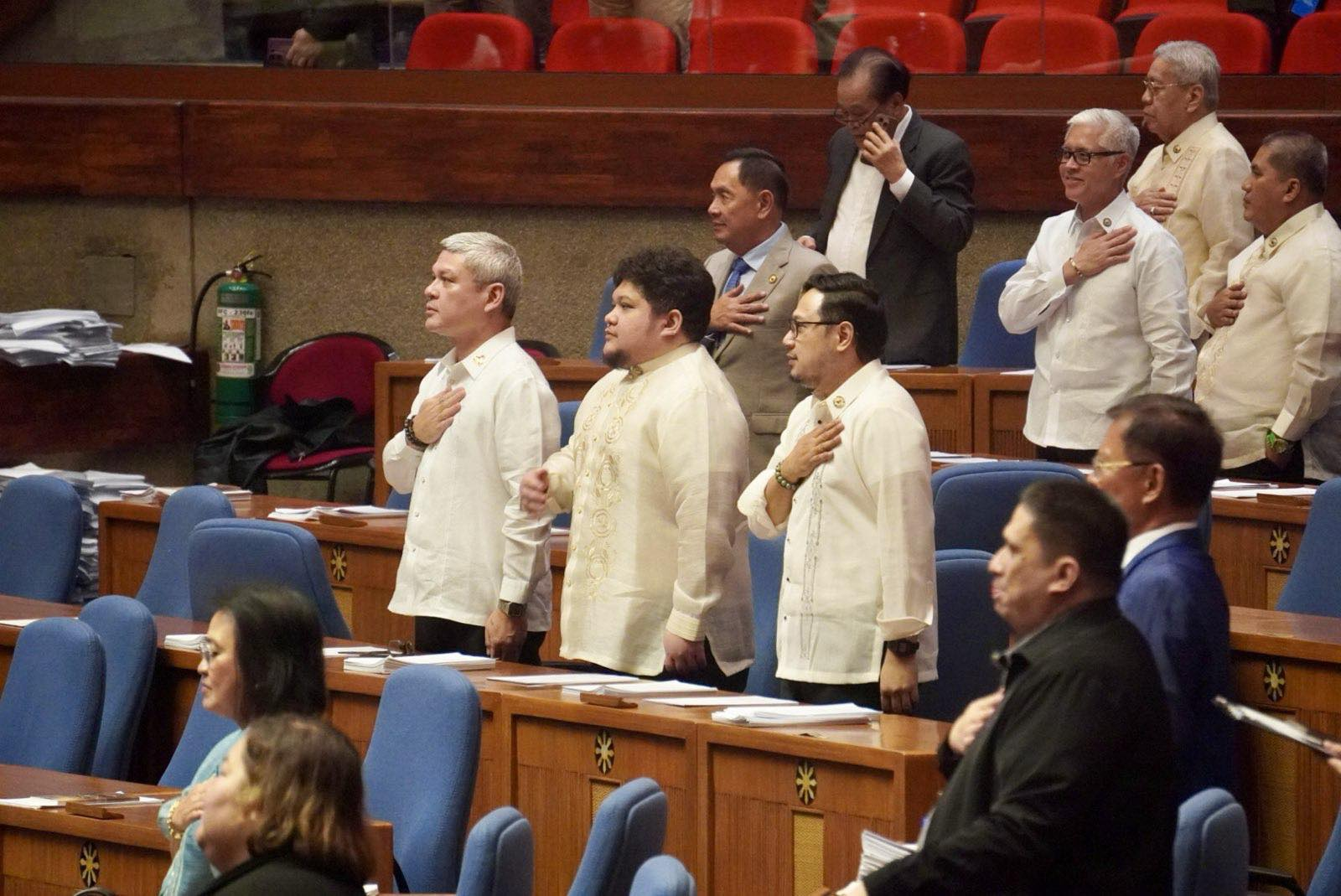
Paolo Duterte (left) during regular session

Following the arrest of his father in March 2025, Duterte and his siblings filed a petition with the Supreme Court to seek the immediate release of their father, arguing that the detention violated national sovereignty and due process. On March 20, House Speaker Martin Romualdez approved his travel clearance for his personal trip to 17 countries until May 10, 2025, covering the congressional break and the campaign period for his reelection bid.

Amid the flood control projects scandal in the Philippines, ACT Teachers Partylist Representative Antonio Tinio said that his review of 80 flood control projects worth ₱4.35 billion in Davao City showed signs of irregularity, including 62 projects that lacked details on their awarding and 10 that were not part of the General Appropriations Act.

The Anti–Money Laundering Council (AMLC) has also confirmed that Chinese drug lord Sammy Uy, who was appointed by former president Rodrigo Duterte as his economic adviser, gave a minimum of P181.6 million in payments via cashier’s and personal checks to various members of the Duterte family from 2011 to 2013 alone. Four transactions, amounting to P38.81 million, were deposited into the account of Paolo Duterte.

== Personal life and controversies ==
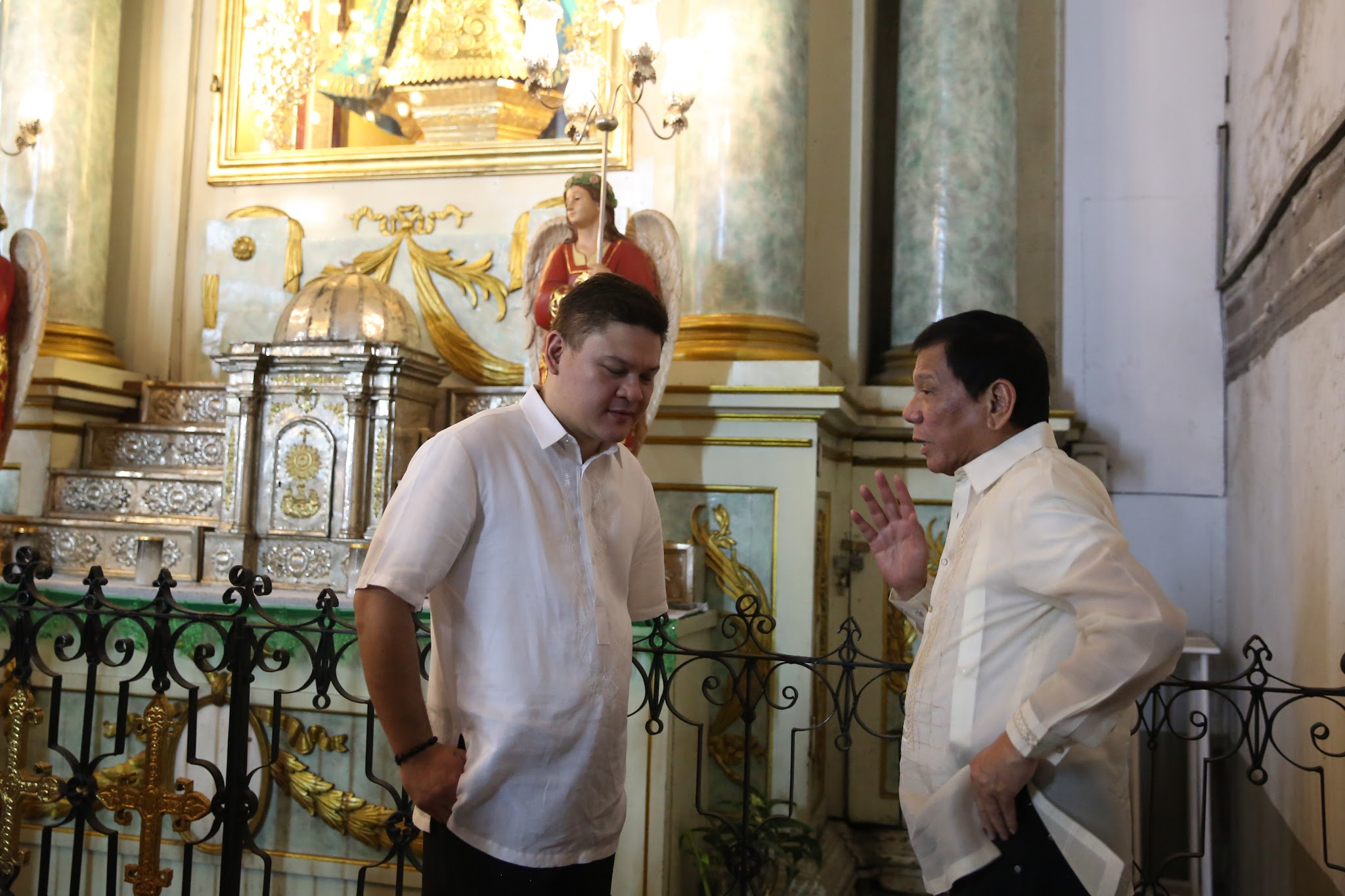
Paolo Duterte (left) with his father President Rodrigo Duterte during a wedding ceremony at the San Agustin Church on September 16, 2016.

Duterte's first wife was Lovelie Sangkola, who is of Tausūg descent. They had three children: Omar Vincent (born January 26, 1994), Rodrigo II ("Rigo", born February 23, 1998), and Isabelle (born January 19, 2000). Paolo and Sangkola separated in 2005, with their marriage annulled in a sharia court in 2006.

Paolo then married his longtime girlfriend, January Navares, in December 2010. They have two children together, Sabina Duterte and Paolo Duterte II. Navares-Duterte succeeded him as the barangay captain of Barangay Catalunan Grande, Davao City in 2013.

Duterte has four grandchildren: Rodrigo Duterte III, son of Rodrigo II; and Mira, Arturo Vicente Duterte and Ronika Duterte, the son and daughters of Omar.

According to Ramil Madriaga, a former aide to both President Duterte and Vice President Sara Duterte, Paolo was described by his father as "baliw" (lit. 'crazy').

=== 1999 maul incident ===
During his studies, Paolo Duterte was accused of mauling a hotel guard in 1999, causing his father Rodrigo to submit his resignation as congressman, although it was declined by President Joseph Estrada.

=== Drug money and involvement in drugs and human trafficking ===
Paolo Duterte has been confirmed by the Anti–Money Laundering Council (AMLC) to have received drug money from Chinese drug lord Sammy Uy, the economic adviser of his father Rodrigo Duterte. At least P181.6 million in payments via cashier’s and personal checks to various members of the Duterte family from 2011 to 2013 alone were confirmed. Four transactions worth P38.81 million were under Paolo Duterte.

He has been associated with the Chinese organized crime syndicate Triad, known for drug smuggling and other crimes. It was alleged that his back has a tattoo which only Triad members are allowed to have. Duterte has refused to show his back multiple times, leading to suspicions.

On February 23, 2025, a verified CCTV footage showed Paolo Duterte threatening a pimp for not giving him enough prostitutes inside a bar. Duterte was wielding a knife and was attempting to use the knife against the pimp who was pleading for his life. Duterte also headbutted a woman in the vicinity. Various sectors condemned the incident, with women's groups sounding the alarm, criticizing Duterte, an elected official, for indulging in human trafficking and prostitution.

== Electoral history ==
Electoral history of Paolo Duterte
Year	Office	Party	Votes received				Result
Year	Office	Party	Total	%	P.	Swing	Result
2013	Vice Mayor of Davao City	HTL	437,266	—N/a	1st	—N/a	Won
2016	Vice Mayor of Davao City	HTL	522,119	100.00%	1st	—N/a	Unopposed
2019	Representative (Davao City–1st)	HTL	197,370	—N/a	1st	—N/a	Won
2022	Representative (Davao City–1st)	HNP	224,008	92.94%	1st	—N/a	Won
2025	Representative (Davao City–1st)	HTL	203,557	78.75%	1st	—N/a	Won

House of Representatives of the Philippines
Preceded by Karlo Nograles	Member of the House of Representatives from Davao City's 1st district 2019–present	Incumbent
Political offices
Preceded by Jesus Sabio	Barangay Captain of Catalunan Grande, Davao City; 2007–2013	Succeeded by January Duterte
Preceded by Rodrigo Duterte	Vice Mayor of Davao City; 2013–2018	Succeeded by Bernard Al-ag; Acting
