= Duterte family =

Filipino political family

- Political family
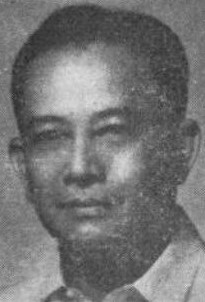
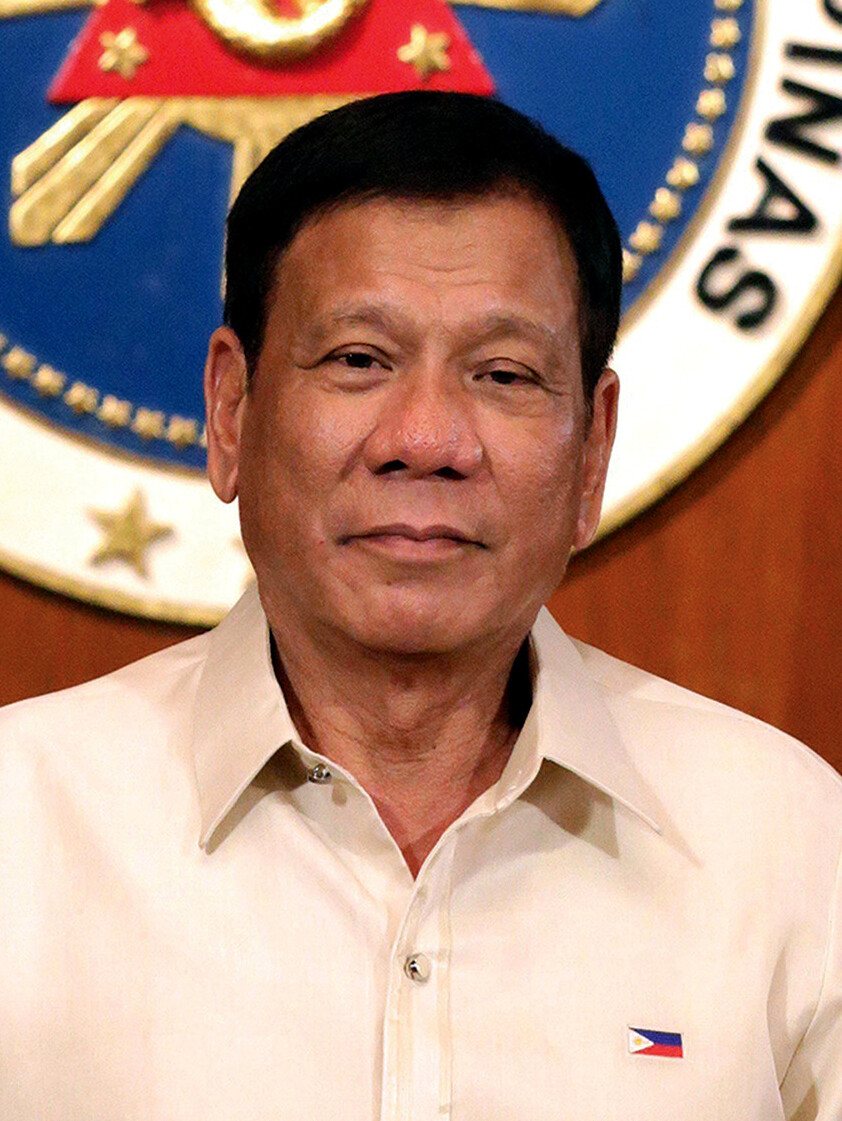
- Vicente; Duterte Rodrigo; Duterte Sara; Duterte Sebastian; Duterte
- Country: Philippines
- Current region: Davao City and Cebu, Philippines
- Origin: Danao, Cebu, Philippine Islands
- Founded: April 18, 1945; 81 years ago
- Founder: Vicente Duterte
- Current head: Rodrigo Duterte
- Titles: List: President of the Philippines; Vice President of the Philippines; Mayor of Davao City; Secretary of Philippine Education; Vice Mayor of Davao City; Governor of Davao; House Representative (Davao City-1st); House Representative (Davao City-2nd); Party-list Representative (PPP); Councilor (Davao City); Secretary of General Services
- Members: List: Vicente Duterte; Rodrigo Duterte; Sara Duterte; Paolo Duterte; Sebastian Duterte; Kitty Duterte; Omar Duterte; Rigo Duterte; Harold Duterte; Ronald Duterte and others
- Connected members: Soledad Roa Duterte; Elizabeth Zimmerman; Honeylet Avanceña; Mans Carpio
- Connected families: Veloso family Durano family Carpio family
- Distinctions: Facundo Duterte y Buot and Zoila Gonzáles y Enríquez
- Traditions: Roman Catholicism and Islam

The Duterte family (English: /dəˈtɜːrteɪ/, Tagalog: [dʊˈtɛɾtɛ]) is a Filipino political family and is one of the most influential political dynasties in the Philippines, along with the Aquino family and the Marcos family, who they have been feuding with since late 2021. The family's political journey began with Vicente Duterte, who served as the mayor of Danao from 1945 to 1946 and governor of the then-unified Davao province from 1959 to 1965.

== History ==
The Duterte family hails from the province of Cebu, where their political career also began. Ramon and Vicente Duterte entered politics. Ramon served as vice mayor and subsequently as mayor of Cebu City. Vicente also began his career in his home province, serving as mayor of the then-municipality of Danao after moving to then-unified Davao province in 1951. He became governor of the then-undivided Davao province and eventually joined the cabinet of President Ferdinand Marcos. Ramon’s son, Ronald Duterte, served as mayor of Cebu during the 1980s.

One of Vicente’s children continued the family’s political traditions, with a strong focus on regional politics. Rodrigo Duterte, who was initially served as the vice mayor of Davao from 1986 to 1987. In 1988, he was elected mayor of the city. He spent 22 years as the head of the city’s government, across several separate terms. In 2016, he was elected president of the country, a mandate he held for a full six-year term until 2022. Three of Rodrigo’s children became involved in politics, and all of them played a role for governing the family’s stronghold in Davao City. Sara Duterte, has served as Vice President of the Philippines since 2022.

== Notable Political Figures ==
=== Vicente Duterte (1911–1968) ===
Vicente Duterte, served as mayor of Danao, Cebu (1945–1946), governor of Davao (1959–1965) and secretary of General Services (1965–1968).

=== Rodrigo Duterte (born 1945) ===
Rodrigo Duterte, Vicente's son, served 21 years as mayor of Davao City before becoming the 16th President of the Philippines in 2016.

=== Sara Duterte (born 1978) ===
Sara Duterte, served as vice mayor (2007–2010) and mayor (2010–2013, 2016–2022) of Davao City. In 2022, she was elected as the 15th Vice President of the Philippines.

=== Paolo Duterte (born 1975) ===
Paolo "Pulong" Duterte, held positions as barangay captain (2007–2013), vice mayor (2013–2018) and currently serves as a congressman representing Davao City's 1st district since 2019.

=== Sebastian Duterte (born 1987) ===
Sebastian "Baste" Duterte, served as vice mayor from 2019 to 2022 and assumed the role of Davao City mayor in 2022, focusing on digitalization and infrastructure projects.

=== Kitty Duterte (born 2004) ===
Veronica "Kitty" Duterte, is the youngest daughter of former Philippine president Rodrigo Duterte and his partner Cielito "Honeylet" Avanceña.

=== Omar Duterte (born 1994) ===
Omar Vincent Duterte, representative for Davao City's 2nd district since 2025 and former barangay captain of Buhangin Proper from 2023 to 2025.

=== Rigo Duterte (born 1998) ===
Rodrigo "Rigo" Duterte II, member of the Davao City Council and vice mayor of Davao City since 2025. He was initially elected as member of the Davao City Council from the 1st district in 2025 but did not formally assume his seat to serve as acting vice mayor.

=== Ronald Duterte (1934–2016) ===
Ronald Duterte, Rodrigo's cousin, mayor of Cebu City from 1983 to 1986, vice mayor from 1980 to 1983 and councilor from 1963 to 1980.

=== Harold Duterte (born 1978) ===
Harold Duterte, Rodrigo's nephew, representative of the Puwersa ng Pilipinong Pandagat Party-list since 2025.

== Other Political Figures ==
=== Ramon Durano III (born 1948) ===
Ramon Durano III, Rodrigo's cousin, mayor of Danao since 2025; as he previously served in the same position from 2013 to 2022 and 2001 to 2010, vice mayor of Danao from 2022 to 2025; as he previously served in the same position from 2010 to 2013, representative for Cebu's 5th district from 1987 to 1998, member of Batasang Pambansa from 1984 to 1986 and vice governor of Cebu from 1980 to 1984.

=== Ramon Durano VI (born 1969) ===
Ramon Durano VI, Rodrigo's nephew, representative for Cebu's 5th district from 2016 to 2019; as he previously served in the same position from 2005 to 2013 and vice mayor of Danao from 2013 to 2016.

=== Ace Durano (born 1970) ===
Ace Durano, Rodrigo's nephew, provincial administrator of Cebu since 2025, representative for Cebu's 5th district from 2013 to 2016; as he previously served in the same position from 1998 to 2004 and Secretary of Tourism from 2004 to 2010.

== Summary table ==
Duterte Family
Birth	Death	Image	Name	Relationship to Rodrigo Duterte	Nationality	Office	Occupation	Ref
November 23, 1911	February 21, 1968		Vicente Duterte	Father of Rodrigo Duterte	Filipino	Secretary of General Services	Politician and lawyer	
November 14, 1916	February 4, 2012		Soledad Duterte	Mother of Rodrigo Duterte	Filipino		Teacher, entrepreneur and activist	
January 15, 1934	June 26, 2016		Ronald Duterte	Cousin of Rodrigo Duterte	Filipino	Mayor of Cebu City	Politician and lawyer	
	Alive		Eleanor Duterte	Sister of Rodrigo Duterte	Filipino			
March 28, 1945	Alive		Rodrigo Duterte	Himself	Filipino	President of the Philippines	Politician and lawyer	
July 7, 1948	Alive		Ramon Durano III	Cousin of Rodrigo Duterte	Filipino	Mayor of Danao, Cebu	Politician	
September	Alive		Emmanuel Duterte	Brother of Rodrigo Duterte	Filipino			
	Alive		Nuelle Duterte	Niece of Rodrigo Duterte (By Emmanuel)	Filipino			
1948	September 29, 2023		Jocelyn Duterte-Villarica	Sister of Rodrigo Duterte	Filipino			
October 13, 1953	February 7, 2026		Benjamin "Bong" Duterte	Brother of Rodrigo Duterte	Filipino			
	Alive		Nitzkie Lopez Sodusta	Cousin of Rodrigo Duterte	Filipino			
April 14, 1948	Alive		Elizabeth Zimmerman	Former wife of Rodrigo Duterte	German-Filipino			
February 7, 1969	Alive		Ramon Durano VI	Nephew of Rodrigo Duterte	Filipino		Politician and businessman	
February 17, 1970	Alive		Honeylet Avanceña	Common law wife of Rodrigo Duterte	Filipino		Businesswoman and former nurse	
April 3, 1970	Alive		Ace Durano	Nephew of Rodrigo Duterte	Filipino	Provincial Administrator of the Provincial Government of Cebu	Politician and lawyer	
March 24, 1975	Alive		Paolo Duterte	Son of Rodrigo Duterte and Elizabeth	Filipino	Representative of Davao City's 1st district	Politician and businessman	
May 31, 1978	Alive		Sara Duterte	Daughter of Rodrigo Duterte and Elizabeth	Filipino	Vice President of the Philippines	Politician and lawyer	
	Alive		Mans Carpio	Son in law of Rodrigo Duterte (By Sara)	Filipino	Second Spouse of the Philippines	Lawyer	
August 7, 1978	Alive		Harold Duterte	Nephew of Rodrigo Duterte	Filipino	Partylist representative of Puwersa ng Pilipinong Pandagat	Politician and businessman	
November 3, 1987	Alive		Sebastian Duterte	Son of Rodrigo Duterte and Elizabeth	Filipino	Mayor of Davao City	Politician and businessman	
	Alive		January Navares Duterte	Daughter in law of Rodrigo Duterte (By Paolo)	Filipino	Barangay Chairwoman of Catalunan Grande	Politician	
January 26, 1994	Alive		Omar Duterte	Grandson of Rodrigo Duterte (By Paolo)	Filipino	Representative of Davao City's 2nd district	Politician and businessman	
	Alive		Jennifer Yamuta	Granddaughter in law of Rodrigo Duterte (By Omar)	Filipino			
February 23, 1998	Alive		Rigo Duterte	Grandson of Rodrigo Duterte (By Paolo)	Filipino	Vice Mayor of Davao City	Politician and businessman	
	Alive		Yssa Labrador	Granddaughter in law of Rodrigo Duterte (By Rigo)	Filipino			
January 19, 2000	Alive		Isabelle Duterte	Granddaughter of Rodrigo Duterte (By Paolo)	Filipino			
April 10, 2004	Alive		Kitty Duterte	Daughter of Rodrigo Duterte and Honeylet	Filipino and American		Socialite	
2006	Alive		Sabina Duterte	Granddaughter of Rodrigo Duterte (By Paolo)	Filipino			
March 7, 2008	Alive		Mikhaila Maria Carpio	Granddaughter of Rodrigo Duterte (By Sara)	Filipino			
April 1, 2013	Alive		Mateo Lucas Carpio	Grandson of Rodrigo Duterte (By Sara)	Filipino			
September 22, 2013	Alive		Paolo Duterte II	Grandson of Rodrigo Duterte (By Paolo)	Filipino			
June 11, 2014	Alive		Yair Duterte	Grandson of Rodrigo Duterte (By Sebastian)	Filipino			
March 2, 2017	Alive		Marko Digong Carpio	Grandson of Rodrigo Duterte (By Sara)	Filipino			
April 4, 2019	Alive		Mira Duterte	Great-granddaughter of Rodrigo Duterte (By Omar)	Filipino			
August 2019	Alive		Godfrey Duterte	Great-grandson of Rodrigo Duterte (By Omar)	Filipino			
2019	Alive		Rodrigo Duterte III	Great-grandson of Rodrigo Duterte (By Rigo)	Filipino			
	Alive		Ronika Duterte	Great-granddaughter of Rodrigo Duterte (By Omar)	Filipino			

== See also ==
- List of political families in the Philippines
- Diehard Duterte Supporters
- Dutertismo
