= Hugpong sa Tawong Lungsod =

Dutertist political party based in Davao City

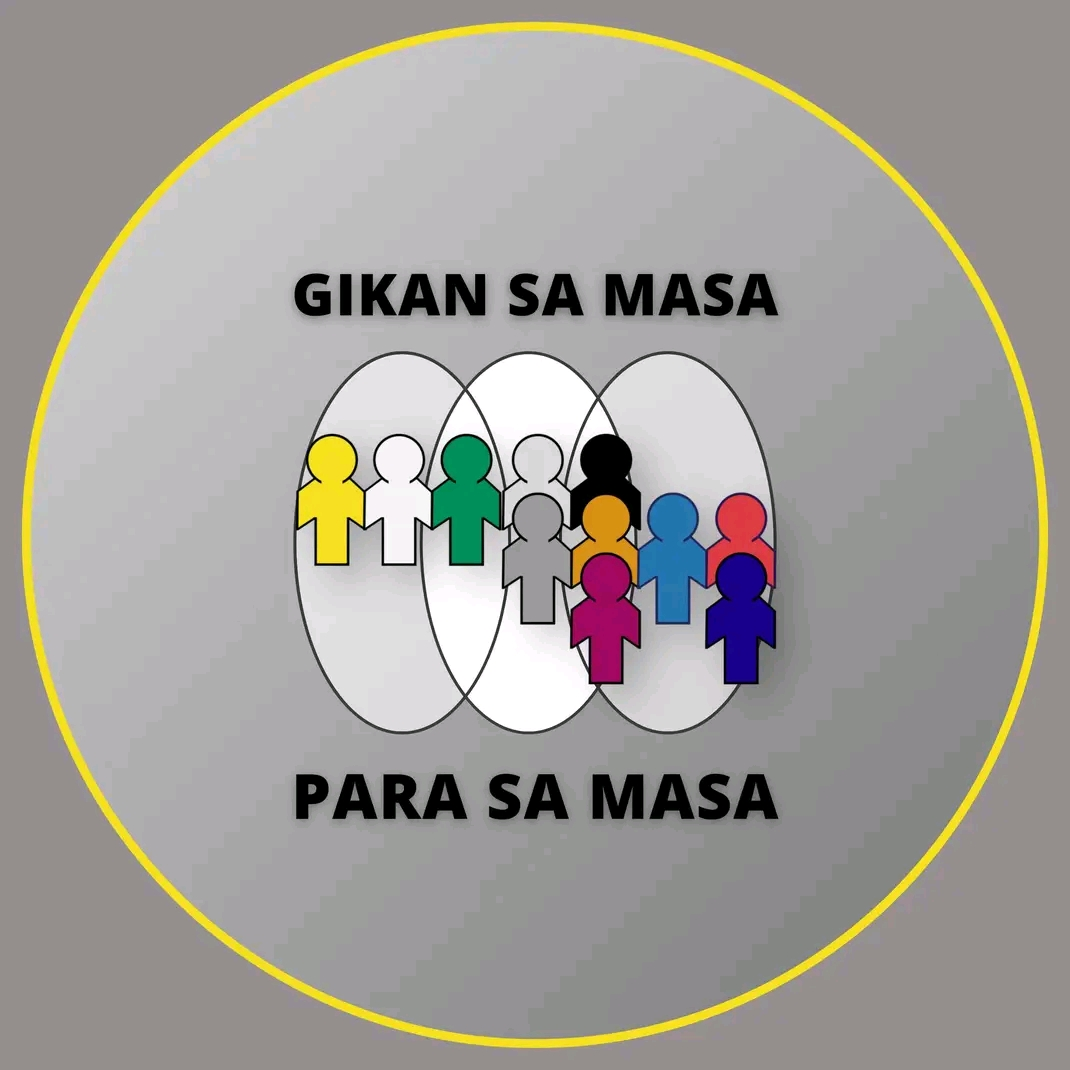
- President: Leoncio Evasco Jr.
- Founder: Rodrigo Duterte
- Founded: 2000 (local alliance); March 28, 2011 (local party)
- Headquarters: Davao City
- Ideology: Populism; Localism; Dutertismo
- National affiliation: PDP (since 2015); Liberal (2009–2015); Lakas (2001–2009)
- Colors: Green, red, blue
- House of Representatives: 3 / 3 (Davao City seats only)
- City Mayor: 1 / 1
- City Vice Mayor: 1 / 1
- Davao City Council: 24 / 24

Hugpong sa Tawong Lungsod (lit. 'Party of the City People'), commonly referred to as Hugpong, is a Dutertist local political party based in Davao City. It was founded by Rodrigo Duterte, former mayor of Davao City and 16th president of the Philippines. Hugpong is the precursor of the regional political party Hugpong ng Pagbabago.

== History ==
Hugpong was organized in late 2000 as a local political alliance in Davao City by then-first district congressman Rodrigo Duterte, who was making a comeback for mayor of Davao City after a three-year term in Congress. Duterte was then running under PDP–Laban in 2001 against his former ally, then-incumbent mayor Benjamin de Guzman, who coalesced Alyansa sa Katawhan sa Dabaw, the political alliance he co-founded in 1998 with Duterte, with former congressman Prospero Nograles, Duterte's political rival. Duterte won the elections against de Guzman, but Hugpong won only four out of 24 elective seats in the City Council.

In 2004, Duterte won once more against de Guzman by a margin of over 150,000 votes, and Hugpong won a majority of 20 seats in the council. Duterte's landslide victory solidified his citywide political dominance as well as that of Hugpong. Hugpong was formally registered as a local political party in March 2011 with the Commission on Elections (COMELEC).

During the 2019 elections, Davao City Mayor Sara Duterte formed Hugpong ng Pagbabago, a regional political party. However, Duterte later thought of leaving HNP to head Hugpong, stating that "it’s calmer" in the local party. She initially planned to leave HNP after the 2019 elections, but the plan did not push through.

In September 2021, several political figures allied with the Duterte family joined Hugpong for the 2022 elections, including news anchors Tek Ocampo and Tambi Sarenas. Hugpong was revived as an active local party in 2024, with the Dutertes and their allies registering their candidacies under the Hugpong banner for the 2025 local elections.

== Notable members ==
- Rodrigo Duterte (16th president of the Philippines, longest-serving mayor of Davao City and party founder)
- Sara Duterte (15th and incumbent Vice President of the Philippines, former mayor of Davao City)
- Paolo Duterte (former vice mayor of Davao City and incumbent representative of Davao City's 1st congressional district)
- Sebastian Duterte (incumbent mayor of Davao City and former vice mayor of Davao City)
- Omar Duterte (incumbent representative of Davao City's 2nd congressional district)
- Rigo Duterte (incumbent member of the Davao City Council from Davao City's 1st district and acting vice mayor of Davao City)
- Kitty Duterte (youngest daughter of Rodrigo Duterte and Honeylet Avanceña)
- Isidro Ungab (incumbent representative of Davao City's 3rd congressional district)
- Luzviminda Ilagan (former representative of Gabriela Women's Party)
- Leoncio Evasco Jr. (former Cabinet Secretary of the Philippines)
- Jesus Melchor Quitain (former Chief Presidential Legal Counsel)
