= Sebastian Duterte =

Mayor of Davao City (born 1987)

- Duterte in 2026

22nd Mayor of Davao City
- Incumbent
- Assumed office January 23, 2026 (Note: Sebastian Duterte acted as mayor from June 30, 2025 after Rodrigo Duterte's powers and duties as duly-elected mayor was suspended due to his inability to take the oath of office while currently detained at The Hague; Sebastian assumed office on January 23, 2026.)
- Vice Mayor: Himself; Rigo Duterte
- Preceded by: Rodrigo Duterte
- In office June 30, 2022 – June 30, 2025
- Vice Mayor: J. Melchor Quitain Jr.
- Preceded by: Sara Duterte
- Succeeded by: Rodrigo Duterte
- Acting; March 17, 2022 – June 30, 2022
- Preceded by: Sara Duterte
- Succeeded by: Himself
- Acting; September 28, 2020 – October 5, 2020
- Preceded by: Sara Duterte
- Succeeded by: Sara Duterte
- Acting; July 19, 2019 – September 17, 2019
- Preceded by: Sara Duterte
- Succeeded by: Sara Duterte

13th Vice Mayor of Davao City
- In office June 30, 2025 – January 23, 2026
- Mayor: Rodrigo Duterte
- Preceded by: J. Melchor Quitain Jr.
- Succeeded by: Rigo Duterte
- In office June 30, 2019 – June 30, 2022
- Mayor: Sara Duterte
- Preceded by: Bernard Al-ag (acting)
- Succeeded by: J. Melchor Quitain Jr.
Party positions
President of PDP–Laban
Incumbent
Assumed office June 16, 2025 (Note: Acting until April 11, 2026)
Preceded by	Robin Padilla
Executive Vice President of PDP–Laban
In office September 5, 2024 – April 11, 2026
Preceded by	Robin Padilla
Succeeded by	Atty Jimmy Bondoc

Personal details
- Born: Sebastian Zimmerman Duterte; November 3, 1987 (age 39) Davao City, Philippines
- Party: PDP–Laban (2024–present); HTL (local party; 2024–present)
- Other political affiliations: HNP (2018–2024)
- Domestic partner: Kate Necesario
- Children: 3
- Parents: Rodrigo Duterte (father); Elizabeth Zimmerman (mother)
- Relatives: Duterte family
- Education: Ateneo de Davao University (BA)
- Occupation: Politician; businessman; television host

Sebastian "Baste" Zimmerman Duterte (English: /dəˈtɜːrteɪ/, Tagalog: [dʊˈtɛɾtɛ]; born November 3, 1987) is a Filipino politician who has served as the 22nd mayor of Davao City since 2022. Following the 2025 elections, which he initially won as vice mayor, he served as acting mayor until officially assuming the post permanently in 2026. He previously served as the vice mayor of Davao City from 2019 to 2022.

The youngest son of the 16th president and former Davao City Mayor Rodrigo Duterte and his former wife Elizabeth Zimmerman, Duterte had initially expressed no interest in politics prior to his father becoming president in 2016. He later entered politics in 2019, having run for vice mayor unopposed. After his sister Sara, then the mayor of Davao, ran for vice president, he substituted for her in that year's election, winning in a landslide. After his father sought a return to the city's mayoralty, he ran as his running mate and won. Due to the continued detention of his father at The Hague and subsequent inability to take the oath of office, the Department of the Interior and Local Government (DILG) designated him as acting mayor. On January 23, 2026, Duterte officially became the permanent mayor.

In mid-2025, Duterte became the acting president of the Partido Demokratiko Pilipino party, succeeding Senator Robin Padilla, and was later appointed to the position in April 2026. Duterte has been embroiled in various controversies as mayor, including his failure to curb the deadly floods in Davao city despite the 13,917 flood control projects and a ₱51 billion fund for the city's 1st district alone, the largest in the country, provided to him and other elected members of his family by the national government. The illegal drug trade also expanded in Davao city during his term, while the Anti–Money Laundering Council (AMLC) confirmed that he received P51.58 million across five transactions from alleged drug lord Sammy Uy. He was also criticized for his absenteeism especially during the height of calamities and other crisis, where he was previously seen partying in Europe. Amid his controversies, various accounts afterwards released photos about his alleged on-the-ground help to the people of Tacloban after Typhoon Yolanda hit in 2013. However, AI-fact checkers later verified that the photos were fake and AI-generated.

== Early life and education ==
Duterte was born on November 3, 1987, at Davao Doctors Hospital in Davao City. He is the youngest son of 16th President Rodrigo Duterte and Elizabeth Zimmerman, a Filipina flight-attendant of Filipino and German American descent. His brother, Paolo, is the incumbent representative of Davao City's first district, and his sister Sara is incumbent vice president.

Duterte obtained his high school diploma at San Beda College in Manila. He took up legal management at the same college for a year before moving back to Davao, where he took up political science at Ateneo de Davao University. From 2011-2013, he received P51.58 million across five transactions from Chinese drug lord Sammy Uy, as confirmed by the Anti–Money Laundering Council (AMLC).

He was initially offered by his father to run for Davao City councilor in 2013 and representative in 2016, but he declined. His camp initially alleged that Baste helped on the ground in Tacloban in the aftermath of Typhoon Haiyan in 2013, however, it was later revealed that the photos used in social media were fake and AI-generated. In 2017, photo evidences circulated online, where Duterte was smoking marijuana, an illegal drug under Philippine law.

== Political career ==
=== Vice Mayor of Davao City (2019–2022) ===
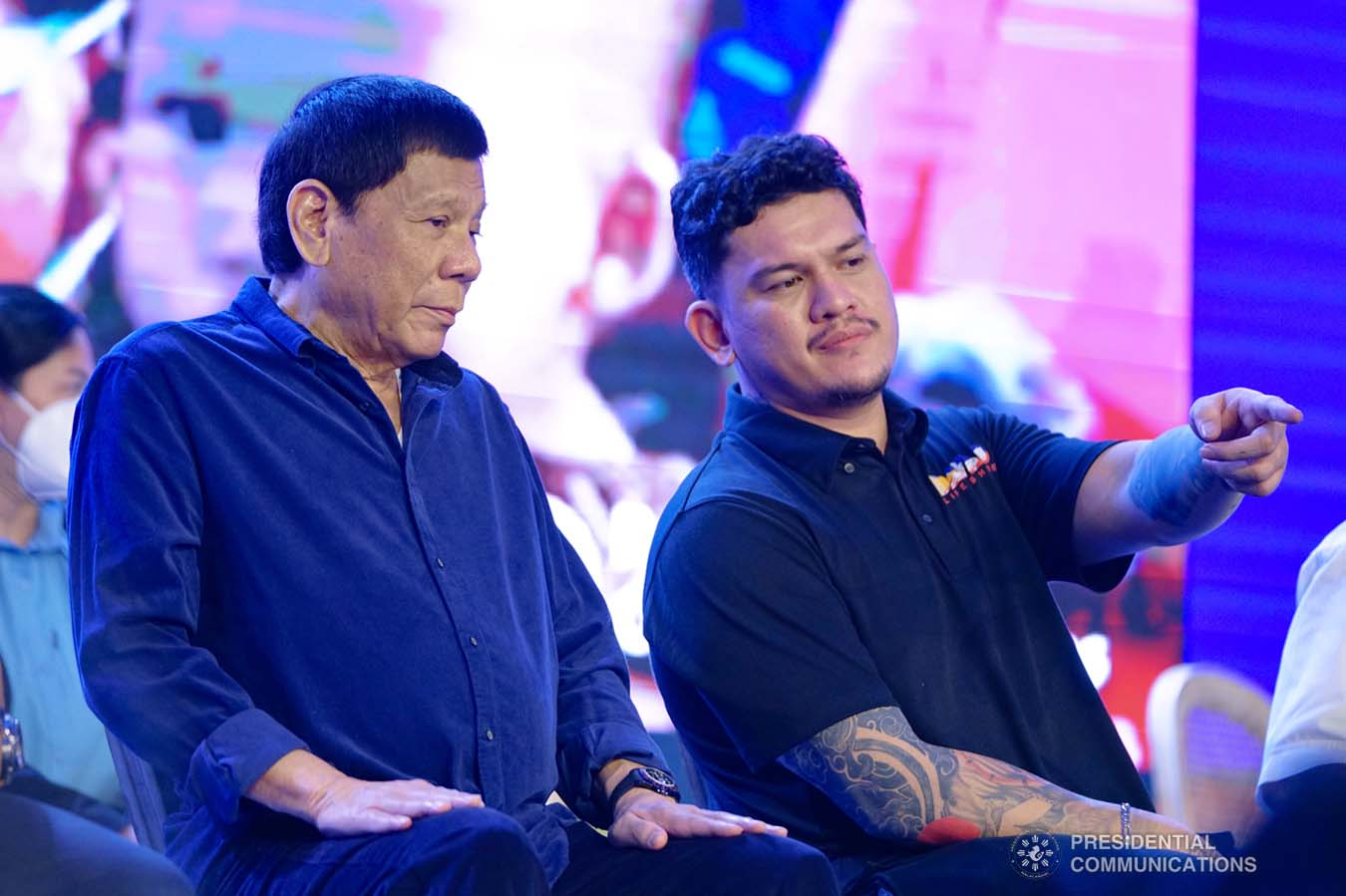
Sebastian Duterte (right) with his father President Rodrigo Duterte (left) in 2022

In 2019, Duterte ran unopposed for vice mayor of Davao City with his sister and incumbent mayor, Sara, as his running mate under the Hugpong ng Pagbabago ticket. The siblings won the election. He has been appointed "acting mayor" of the city thrice: from July 19 to September 17, 2019; from September 28 to October 5, 2020; and from March 17 to June 30, 2022. In November 2021, he welcomed Israeli ambassador Ilan Fluss to his office.

=== Mayor of Davao City (2022–present) ===
On November 9, 2021, Duterte decided to withdraw his re-election bid for vice mayor. He named J. Melchor "Jay" Quitain Jr., Davao City's first district councilor and son of Chief Presidential Legal Counsel Jesus Melchor Quitain, as his substitute. He then ran for mayor as a substitute to his sister Sara, who would later run for vice president. He later won in a landslide victory and assumed office on June 30, 2022.

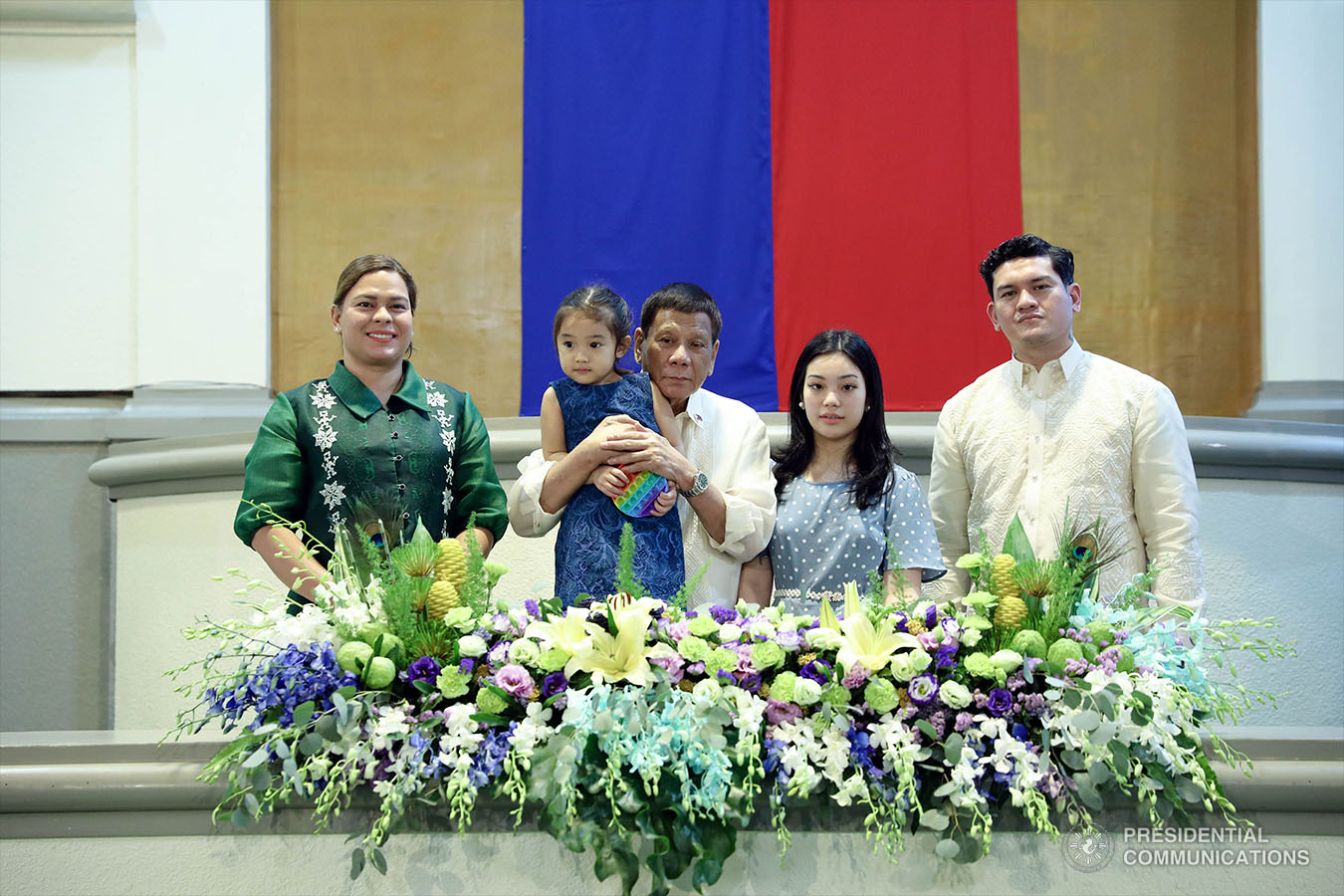
Sebastian Duterte (right) after he sworn as Mayor of Davao City on June 27, 2022.

During his tenure as mayor of Davao City, Duterte oversaw efforts to advance digitalization, economic development, and community engagement. In March 2023, he was appointed by President Bongbong Marcos as Davao Region chairman of the Peace and Order Council (RPOC) under the Department of the Interior and Local Government. His administration introduced the electronic business one stop shop (e-BOSS) to streamline business permits and attracted over ₱1 billion in investments in 2023. Tourism also increased, with 1.3 million arrivals. Key infrastructure projects, including the Davao Public Transport Modernization Project and a new Waste-to-Energy Plant, were initiated.

Duterte was also involved in the Marcos–Duterte rift during the 2024 constitutional reform attempts in the Philippines. On January 28, 2024, he attended the Hakbang ng Maisug prayer rally held in Davao City with his father Rodrigo and sister Sara, which opposed the Marcos administration's Bagong Pilipinas rally in Manila and supported constitutional reforms. During a political forum on the same day, he asked President Bongbong Marcos to resign, accusing him of laziness and incompetence. Although Senator Imee Marcos stated that Duterte later apologized, he clarified that his apology was directed only at the senator "out of pity" and demanded she stop "using him" for political statements.

Duterte (left) and Senator Bong Go (right) during Araw ng Dabaw on March 16, 2025

On September 5, 2024, Duterte joined Partido Demokratiko Pilipino (PDP), the party chaired by his father Rodrigo Duterte, as its new member and executive vice chairperson. It was later announced that he would run for vice mayor once again in 2025, this time as the running mate of his father, who would run for mayor. Following the arrest of his father in March 2025, Duterte condemned the action as a political maneuver by the Marcos administration and even filed a petition with the Supreme Court alongside his siblings to seek the immediate release of their father, arguing the detention violated national sovereignty and due process.

Duterte was elected vice mayor in 2025. However, from the start of his term on June 30, 2025, he would serve as acting mayor while his father, Rodrigo Duterte, was yet to take his oath of office as the duly elected city mayor due to his detention at The Hague, Netherlands. In turn, his nephew, 1st district councilor Rodrigo "Rigo" Duterte II, would serve as the acting vice mayor.

On July 20, 2025, Duterte on his Basta Dabawenyo podcast challenged Philippine National Police (PNP) Chief Nicolas Torre III, whom he feuded with in 2024 and who led the March 2025 operation that arrested his father, to a fistfight after criticizing his three-minute response policy as an opportunity for police "harassment" in the city, with him calling Torre a kidnapper for the arrest and a "coward". Upon learning about the dare on July 23, Torre immediately accepted Duterte's challenge as an opportunity to hold a charity boxing match to raise funds for victims of recent floods. Torre confirmed that a charity boxing match would take place on July 27 at the Rizal Memorial Coliseum in Manila, but Duterte attempted to set conditions that Torre must persuade President Bongbong Marcos to mandate hair follicle drug tests for all elected officials before Duterte could participate. However, Duterte departed for Singapore on July 25 for a personal trip until July 29, stating it was long planned before the match and his travel clearance was approved by DILG Secretary Jonvic Remulla on July 20. On July 27, Torre was declared the winner by default in the match after Duterte failed to show up.

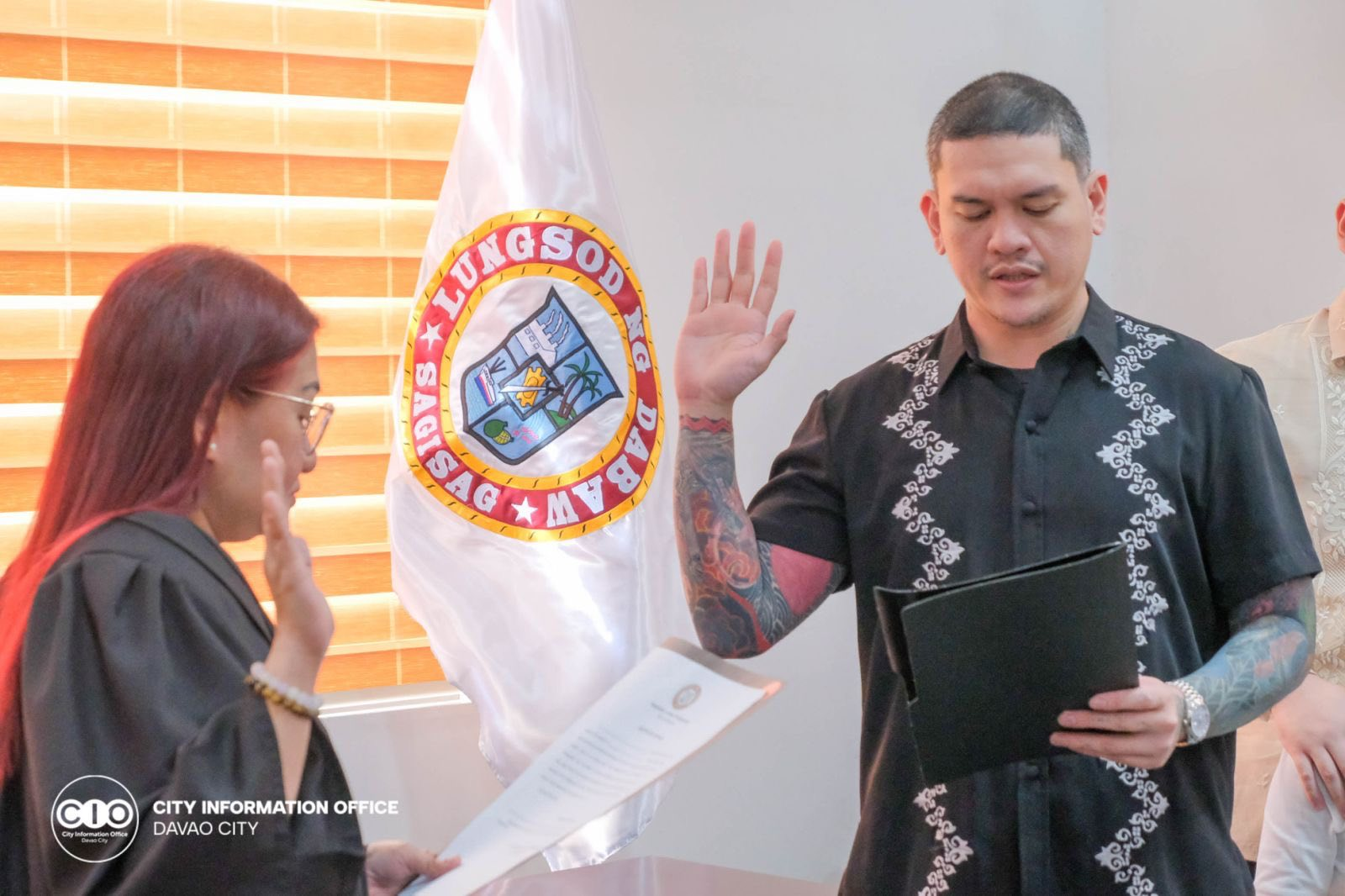
Duterte (right) take his oath officially as Mayor of Davao City on January 23, 2026.

On January 23, 2026, Duterte was sworn in as the permanent mayor of Davao City, following his father Rodrigo's failure to take the oath of office within the six-month prescribed period due to his detention at The Hague. By law of succession, the vice mayoralty was also declared vacant and subsequently filled by his nephew, Rigo. On the evening of April 11, 2026, Duterte was appointed the official party president of the PDP during its national council meeting in Santa Mesa, Manila, and a day later became the head of the Reform Alliance for Good Governance and Accountability (RAGE) coalition newly launched by the PDP. He succeeds Senator Robin Padilla, who had initially announced Duterte's official appointment as PDP president on Facebook.

His mayorship has been embroiled for its failure to mitigate and control deadly flood waters, despite the 13,917 flood control projects in Davao City and a ₱51 billion fund for the city's 1st district alone, the largest for any district in the country, provided by the national government to the city. He has also been criticized for his absenteeism even during calamities and other crisis in Davao. During the Davao flooding in July 2026, Duterte was spotted partying in Ibiza, Spain, while the illegal drug trade expanded in Davao City, where millions of pesos worth of illegal drugs have been discovered.

Duterte taking oath as witness during the impeachment trial of Sara Duterte on September 29, 2026.

While the Impeachment trial of Sara Duterte was ongoing, Davao city mayor Baste Duterte confessed that he had no knowledge that his sister was involved with the contracts he himself approved with GenCorp Industries Inc., a company admitted by Sara Duterte as connected to her in her own SALN which is illegal under Philippine law. In the same statement, he also confirmed that P35.878 million was involved in the contracts, much large than what was initially thought by investigators, which was initially almost P15 million. His confession was viewed by prosecution lawyers as a failure of due diligence as a mayor.

The Anti–Money Laundering Council (AMLC) also confirmed that he received P51.58 million across five transactions from alleged drug lord Sammy Uy, totalling P181.6 million in payments via cashier’s and personal checks to various members of the Duterte family from 2011 to 2013 alone. Amid the controversial revelations, various accounts across different social media platforms spread photos and essays stating that Duterte personally arrived in Tacloban to help those affected by Typhoon Yolanda back in 2013. However, AI-fact checkers later verified that the photos being spread by his supporters were fake and AI-generated instead.

== Personal life ==
Duterte is a surfer and often posts images of himself surfing. He launched his own reality travel show Lakbai on TV5 in 2017, and has hosted the podcast called Basta Dabawenyo since its launch in 2024. Prior to 2016, Duterte formed a metal band in which he served as the vocalist.

Duterte, although unmarried, has three children, two of whom, Yair (born 2014) and one other child, are with model Darrela Kate Necesario, his long-time live-in partner. His eldest child, Yulia Africa ("Bella", born 2010), was born to Vanessa L. Basilio, an overseas Filipino worker. He was also involved in a months-long relationship with actress Ellen Adarna in the latter-half of 2016.

Duterte's habit of being absent from his family was criticized by his father, who called him "tarantado" (transl. good-for-nothing; jerk) during a public speech in 2017. In a validated testimony by Ramil Madriaga, a former aide to both President Duterte and Vice President Sara Duterte, Sebastian was described by his father as "bading" (lit. 'gay'). A male friend previously posted in Facebook as well that he and Sebastian Duterte slept in bed together in 2018, a post Duterte never denied.

== Electoral history ==
Electoral history of Sebastian Duterte
Year	Office	Party		Votes received				Result
Year	Office	Local	National	Total	%	P.	Swing	Result
2019	Vice Mayor of Davao City	HNP	—N/a	557,277	—N/a	1st	—N/a	Unopposed
2025	Vice Mayor of Davao City	HTL	PDP	651,356	88.33%	1st	—N/a	Won
2022	Mayor of Davao City	HNP	—N/a	621,766	89.30%	1st	—N/a	Won

== Notes ==
Political offices
Preceded by Bernard Al-ag as Acting Vice Mayor of Davao City	Vice Mayor of Davao City; 2019–2022	Succeeded by J. Melchor Quitain Jr.
Preceded by Sara Duterte	Mayor of Davao City; 2022–2025	Succeeded by Rodrigo Duterte
Preceded by J. Melchor Quitain Jr.	Vice Mayor of Davao City; 2025–present	Succeeded by Rigo Duterte as Acting Vice Mayor of Davao City
Preceded by Rodrigo Duterte	Mayor of Davao City; Acting; 2025–present	Incumbent
Party political offices
Preceded by Robin Padilla	President of Partido Demokratiko Pilipino; Acting; 2025–present	Incumbent
