= Davao City Council =

Legislative body in the Philippines

Davao City Council Sangguniang Panlungsod ng Dabaw
- 21st Sangguniang Panglungsod ng Davao
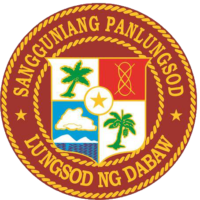

Type
- Type: Unicameral
- Term limits: 3 terms (9 years)

History
- Founded: 1937

Leadership
- Presiding Officer: Rigo Duterte, HTL
- President Pro Tempore: Edgar P. Ibuyan, Jr. (HTL)
- Floor Leader: Jesus Joseph P. Zozobrado III (HTL)
- Assistant Floor Leader: Loui John J. Bonguyan (HTL)

Structure
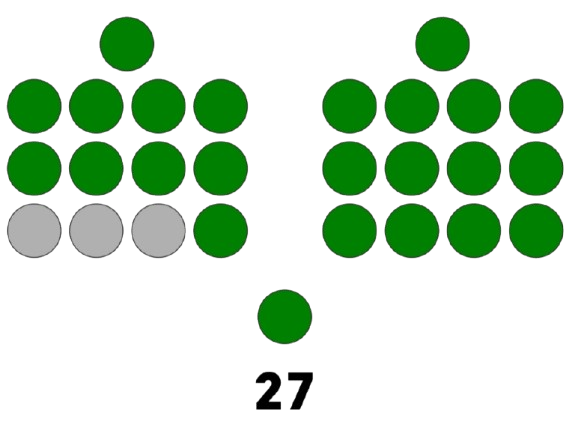
- Political groups: HTL (24); Nonpartisan (3)
- Authority: Davao City Charter; Local Government Code of the Philippines

Elections
- Last election: May 12, 2025
- Next election: May 8, 2028

Meeting place
- Sangguniang Panlungsod, Bolton St, Poblacion District, Davao City

Website
- https://sp.davaocity.gov.ph

The Davao City Council (Filipino: Sangguniang Panlungsod ng Dabaw) as the legislative body of the city, enacts resolutions and ordinances, and appropriate funds for the general welfare of the city and its inhabitants. The Office was established pursuant to Article III, Section 11, Constitution and Organization of the City Council, of Republic Act 4354 otherwise known as “An Act To Reverse The Charter Of The City Of Davao and For Other Purposes” approved on June 19, 1965. The office was created to enact resolutions and ordinances that will redound to the general welfare of the city and its constituents.

This is a list of current and former members of the city councillors in Davao City, Philippines.

== A ==
Councilor	District	Term
Nilo G. Abellera	1st	2001–2004, 2004–2007, 2007–present
Maria Belen S. Acosta	1st	2004–2007, 2007–present
Victorio S. Advincula	3rd	2004–2007, 2007–present
Wilberto E. Al-ag	3rd	2004–2007, 2007–present
Dante L. Apostol	2nd	2007–present

== B ==
Councilor	District	Term
Conrado Baluran	3rd	2004–2007, 2007–present
Samuel B. Bangoy	2nd	2007–present
Karlo S. Bello	3rd	2007–present
Louie John Bonguyan	2nd	2007–present
Pilar C. Braga	1st	2004–2007, 2007–present

== C ==
Councilor	District	Term
Arnolfo Ricardo B. Cabling	2nd	2004–2007, 2007–present

== D ==
Councilor	District	Term
Myrna G. Dalodo-Ortiz	3rd	2007–present
Danilo C. Dayanghirang	2nd	2004–2007, 2007–present

== I ==
Councilor	District	Term
Edgar R. Ibuyan	1st	2007–present

== L ==
Councilor	District	Term
Peter T. Laviña	1st	2001-2004, 2004–2007, 2007–2010
Angela A. Librado-Trinidad	1st	2004–2007, 2007–present

== M ==
Councilor	District	Term
Diosdado A. Mahipus	2nd	2004–2007, 2007–present
Teresita C. Marañon	3rd	2007–present
Bonifacio E. Militar	1st	2001–2004, 2004–2007, 2007–present
Tomas Monteverde, IV	2nd	2007–present

== R ==
Councilor	District	Term
Susabel C. Reta	2nd	2004–2007, 2007–present

== V ==
Councilor	District	Term
Jose Louie Villafuerte	3rd	2004–2007, 2007–present

== Z ==
Councilor	District	Term
Jesus " Baby" Zozobrado, Jr.†	3rd	
Rachel P. Zozobrado	3rd	2007–present
