= Davao City's 1st congressional district =

Legislative district of the Philippines

- Constituency for the House of Representatives of the Philippines
- Map
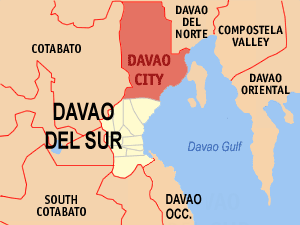
- Location of Davao City within the Davao Region
- City: Davao City
- Region: Davao Region
- Population: 618,729 (2020)
- Electorate: 366,439 (2025)
- Major settlements: 54 barangays: Barangays; Bago Aplaya; Bago Gallera; Baliok; Barangays 1-A–10-A; Barangays 11-B–20-B; Barangays 21-C–30-C; Barangays 31-D–40-D; Bucana; Catalunan Grande; Catalunan Pequeño; Dumoy; Langub; Ma-a; Magtuod; Matina Aplaya; Matina Crossing; Matina Pangi; Talomo Proper

Current constituency
- Created: 1987
- Representative: Paolo Duterte
- Political party: HTL
- Congressional bloc: Independent

Davao City's 1st congressional district is one of the three congressional districts of the Philippines in Davao City. It has been represented in the House of Representatives since 1987. The district covers the city's poblacion or downtown commercial core composed of 40 barangays and Talomo district that borders it to the west which consists of 14 barangays. It is currently represented in the 20th Congress by Paolo Duterte of the Hugpong sa Tawong Lungsod (HTL).

== Representation history ==
#	Image	Member	Term of office		Congress	Party	Electoral history	Constituent LGUs
#	Image	Member	Start	End	Congress	Party	Electoral history	Constituent LGUs
=== Davao City's 1st district for the House of Representatives of the Philippines ===
District created February 2, 1987 from Davao City's at-large district.
1		Jesus Dureza	June 30, 1987	June 16, 1989	8th	Independent	Elected in 1987. Removed from office after an electoral protest.	1987–present Poblacion (Barangays 1-A–10-A, 11-B–20-B, 21-C–30-C, 31-D–40-D), Talomo (Bago Aplaya, Bago Gallera, Baliok, Bucana, Catalunan Grande, Catalunan Pequeño, Dumoy, Langub, Ma-a, Magtuod, Matina Aplaya, Matina Crossing, Matina Pangi, Talomo Proper)
2		Prospero Nograles	June 16, 1989	June 30, 1992	8th	LnB	Declared winner of 1987 election.	1987–present Poblacion (Barangays 1-A–10-A, 11-B–20-B, 21-C–30-C, 31-D–40-D), Talomo (Bago Aplaya, Bago Gallera, Baliok, Bucana, Catalunan Grande, Catalunan Pequeño, Dumoy, Langub, Ma-a, Magtuod, Matina Aplaya, Matina Crossing, Matina Pangi, Talomo Proper)
(1)		Jesus Dureza	June 30, 1992	June 30, 1995	9th	NPC	Elected in 1992.	1987–present Poblacion (Barangays 1-A–10-A, 11-B–20-B, 21-C–30-C, 31-D–40-D), Talomo (Bago Aplaya, Bago Gallera, Baliok, Bucana, Catalunan Grande, Catalunan Pequeño, Dumoy, Langub, Ma-a, Magtuod, Matina Aplaya, Matina Crossing, Matina Pangi, Talomo Proper)
(2)		Prospero Nograles	June 30, 1995	June 30, 1998	10th	Independent	Elected in 1995.	1987–present Poblacion (Barangays 1-A–10-A, 11-B–20-B, 21-C–30-C, 31-D–40-D), Talomo (Bago Aplaya, Bago Gallera, Baliok, Bucana, Catalunan Grande, Catalunan Pequeño, Dumoy, Langub, Ma-a, Magtuod, Matina Aplaya, Matina Crossing, Matina Pangi, Talomo Proper)
3		Rodrigo Duterte	June 30, 1998	June 30, 2001	11th	PDP–Laban (LAMMP)	Elected in 1998.	1987–present Poblacion (Barangays 1-A–10-A, 11-B–20-B, 21-C–30-C, 31-D–40-D), Talomo (Bago Aplaya, Bago Gallera, Baliok, Bucana, Catalunan Grande, Catalunan Pequeño, Dumoy, Langub, Ma-a, Magtuod, Matina Aplaya, Matina Crossing, Matina Pangi, Talomo Proper)
(2)		Prospero Nograles	June 30, 2001	June 30, 2010	12th	Lakas	Elected in 2001.	1987–present Poblacion (Barangays 1-A–10-A, 11-B–20-B, 21-C–30-C, 31-D–40-D), Talomo (Bago Aplaya, Bago Gallera, Baliok, Bucana, Catalunan Grande, Catalunan Pequeño, Dumoy, Langub, Ma-a, Magtuod, Matina Aplaya, Matina Crossing, Matina Pangi, Talomo Proper)
(2)		Prospero Nograles	June 30, 2001	June 30, 2010	13th	Lakas	Re-elected in 2004.	1987–present Poblacion (Barangays 1-A–10-A, 11-B–20-B, 21-C–30-C, 31-D–40-D), Talomo (Bago Aplaya, Bago Gallera, Baliok, Bucana, Catalunan Grande, Catalunan Pequeño, Dumoy, Langub, Ma-a, Magtuod, Matina Aplaya, Matina Crossing, Matina Pangi, Talomo Proper)
(2)		Prospero Nograles	June 30, 2001	June 30, 2010	14th	Lakas	Re-elected in 2007.	1987–present Poblacion (Barangays 1-A–10-A, 11-B–20-B, 21-C–30-C, 31-D–40-D), Talomo (Bago Aplaya, Bago Gallera, Baliok, Bucana, Catalunan Grande, Catalunan Pequeño, Dumoy, Langub, Ma-a, Magtuod, Matina Aplaya, Matina Crossing, Matina Pangi, Talomo Proper)
4		Karlo Nograles	June 30, 2010	November 5, 2018	15th	Lakas	Elected in 2010.	1987–present Poblacion (Barangays 1-A–10-A, 11-B–20-B, 21-C–30-C, 31-D–40-D), Talomo (Bago Aplaya, Bago Gallera, Baliok, Bucana, Catalunan Grande, Catalunan Pequeño, Dumoy, Langub, Ma-a, Magtuod, Matina Aplaya, Matina Crossing, Matina Pangi, Talomo Proper)
4		Karlo Nograles	June 30, 2010	November 5, 2018	16th	NUP	Re-elected in 2013.	1987–present Poblacion (Barangays 1-A–10-A, 11-B–20-B, 21-C–30-C, 31-D–40-D), Talomo (Bago Aplaya, Bago Gallera, Baliok, Bucana, Catalunan Grande, Catalunan Pequeño, Dumoy, Langub, Ma-a, Magtuod, Matina Aplaya, Matina Crossing, Matina Pangi, Talomo Proper)
4		Karlo Nograles	June 30, 2010	November 5, 2018	17th	PDP–Laban	Re-elected in 2016. Resigned on appointment as Cabinet Secretary.	1987–present Poblacion (Barangays 1-A–10-A, 11-B–20-B, 21-C–30-C, 31-D–40-D), Talomo (Bago Aplaya, Bago Gallera, Baliok, Bucana, Catalunan Grande, Catalunan Pequeño, Dumoy, Langub, Ma-a, Magtuod, Matina Aplaya, Matina Crossing, Matina Pangi, Talomo Proper)
—	vacant		November 5, 2018	June 30, 2019	17th	–	No special election held to fill vacancy.	1987–present Poblacion (Barangays 1-A–10-A, 11-B–20-B, 21-C–30-C, 31-D–40-D), Talomo (Bago Aplaya, Bago Gallera, Baliok, Bucana, Catalunan Grande, Catalunan Pequeño, Dumoy, Langub, Ma-a, Magtuod, Matina Aplaya, Matina Crossing, Matina Pangi, Talomo Proper)
5		Paolo Duterte	June 30, 2019	Incumbent	18th	NUP	Elected in 2019.	1987–present Poblacion (Barangays 1-A–10-A, 11-B–20-B, 21-C–30-C, 31-D–40-D), Talomo (Bago Aplaya, Bago Gallera, Baliok, Bucana, Catalunan Grande, Catalunan Pequeño, Dumoy, Langub, Ma-a, Magtuod, Matina Aplaya, Matina Crossing, Matina Pangi, Talomo Proper)
5		Paolo Duterte	June 30, 2019	Incumbent	19th	HNP	Re-elected in 2022.	1987–present Poblacion (Barangays 1-A–10-A, 11-B–20-B, 21-C–30-C, 31-D–40-D), Talomo (Bago Aplaya, Bago Gallera, Baliok, Bucana, Catalunan Grande, Catalunan Pequeño, Dumoy, Langub, Ma-a, Magtuod, Matina Aplaya, Matina Crossing, Matina Pangi, Talomo Proper)
5		Paolo Duterte	June 30, 2019	Incumbent	20th	HTL	Re-elected in 2025.	1987–present Poblacion (Barangays 1-A–10-A, 11-B–20-B, 21-C–30-C, 31-D–40-D), Talomo (Bago Aplaya, Bago Gallera, Baliok, Bucana, Catalunan Grande, Catalunan Pequeño, Dumoy, Langub, Ma-a, Magtuod, Matina Aplaya, Matina Crossing, Matina Pangi, Talomo Proper)

== Election results ==
=== 2025 ===
Candidate	Party	Votes	%
Paolo Duterte	Hugpong sa Tawong Lungsod	203,557	78.75
Migs Nograles	Independent	49,186	19.03
Mags Maglana	Independent	3,530	1.37
Janeth Jabines	Independent	1,870	0.72
Rex Labis	Independent	331	0.13
Total		258,474	100.00
Hugpong sa Tawong Lungsod hold			

=== 2022 ===
2022 Philippine House of Representatives elections
Party	Candidate	Votes	%
Hugpong	Paolo Duterte (incumbent)	212,382	92.94
Independent	Mags Maglana	14,122	6.18
Independent	Jamal Kanan	1,366	0.60
Independent	Jovanie Mantawel	642	0.28
Total votes		228,512	100.00
Hugpong hold			

=== 2019 ===
2019 Philippine House of Representatives elections
Party	Candidate	Votes	%
Hugpong	Paolo Duterte	197,370	96.45
Independent	Susan Uyanguren	5,135	2.51
Independent	Rex Labis	2,124	1.04
Total votes		204,629	100.00
Hugpong gain from PDP–Laban			

=== 1987 ===
1987 Philippine House of Representatives elections
Party	Candidate	Votes	%
Independent	Jesus Dureza	33,538	26.97
Lakas	Prospero Nograles	33,531	26.97
UNIDO	Dominador Zuño Jr.	32,438	26.09
Liberal	Exuperio Porras	8,487	6.83
UNIDO	Leon Garcia	4,919	3.96
Liberal	Dominador Carillo	2,556	2.06
PnB	Laurente Ilagan	2,431	1.96
PDP–Laban	Jose Salcedo Quimpo	2,261	1.82
Nacionalista	Victorio Advincula	1,470	1.18
KBL	Felicidad Santos	1,424	1.15
Independent	Paterno Lomantas	484	0.39
Independent	Asterio Perez	333	0.27
Independent	Jose Santos	148	0.12
Independent	Roberto Sencio	133	0.11
Independent	Fortunato Bello	102	0.08
Independent	Apolinario Canada	48	0.04
Independent	Gervacio Nierras	40	0.03
Total votes		124,343	100.00

== See also ==
- Legislative districts of Davao City

House of Representatives of the Philippines
Preceded by Pangasinan's 4th congressional district	Home district of the speaker February 5, 2008 – June 9, 2010	Succeeded by Quezon City's 4th congressional district
