= 2016 Philippine presidential election in Zamboanga Sibugay =

- May 9, 2016
- Registered: 350,699
- Turnout: 78.74%
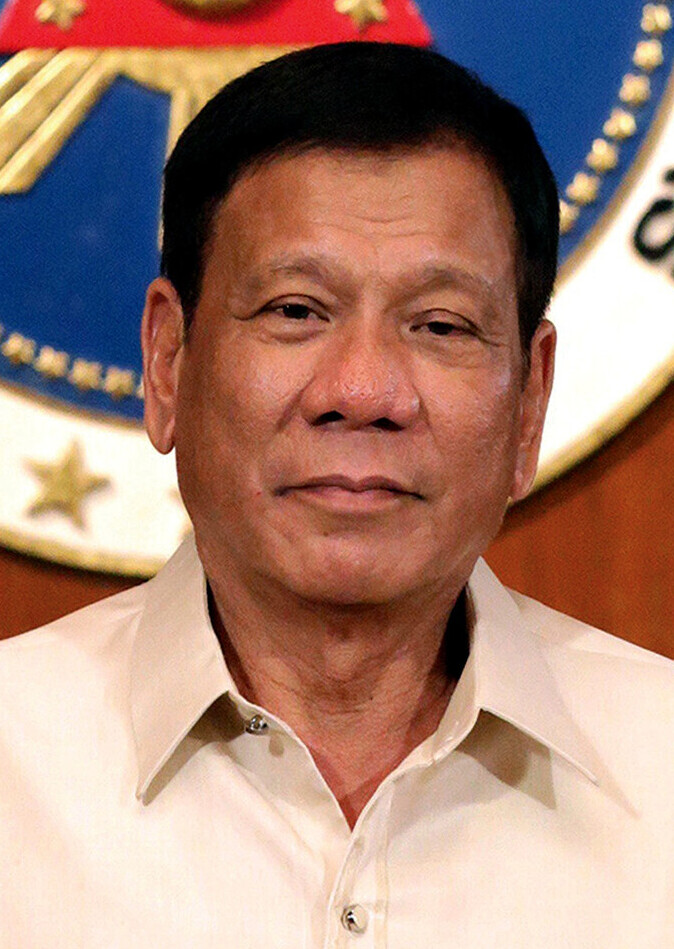

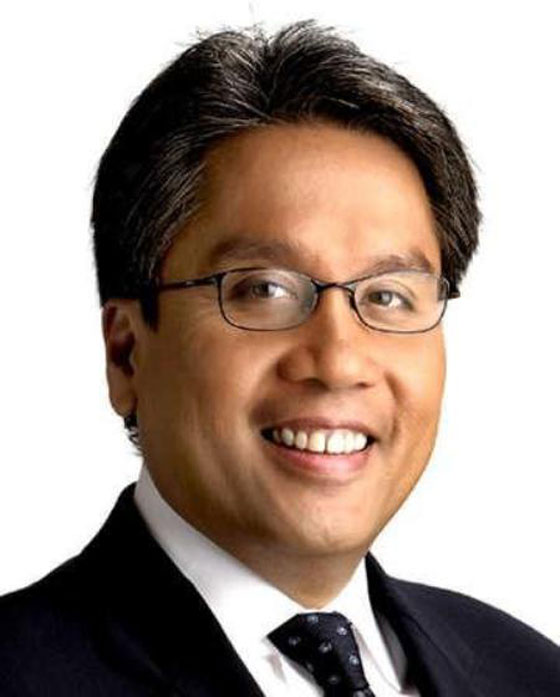

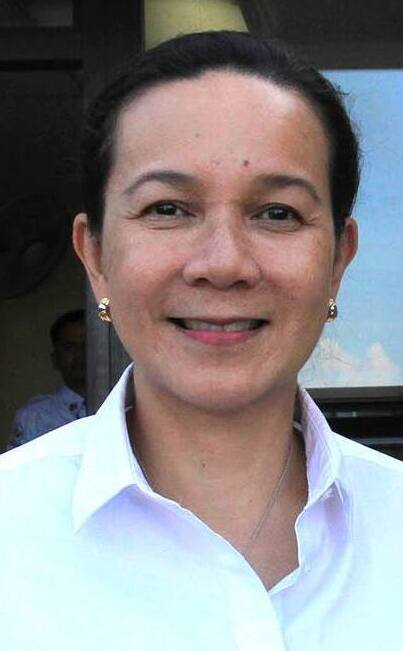
Candidate	Rodrigo Duterte	Mar Roxas	Grace Poe
Party	PDP–Laban	Liberal	Independent
Alliance		KDM	PGP
Running mate	Alan Peter Cayetano	Leni Robredo	Francis Escudero
Popular vote	115,173	84,151	34,385
Percentage	46.18%	33.74%	13.79%
President before election
Benigno Aquino III
Liberal
Elected President
Rodrigo Duterte
PDP–Laban
- 2016 Philippine vice presidential election in Zamboanga Sibugay
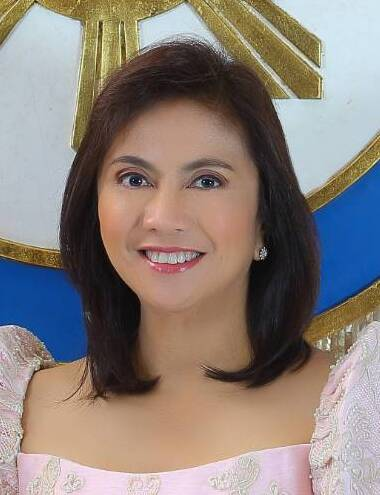

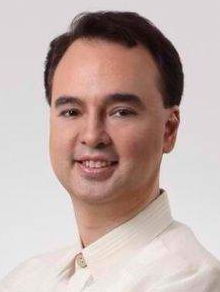

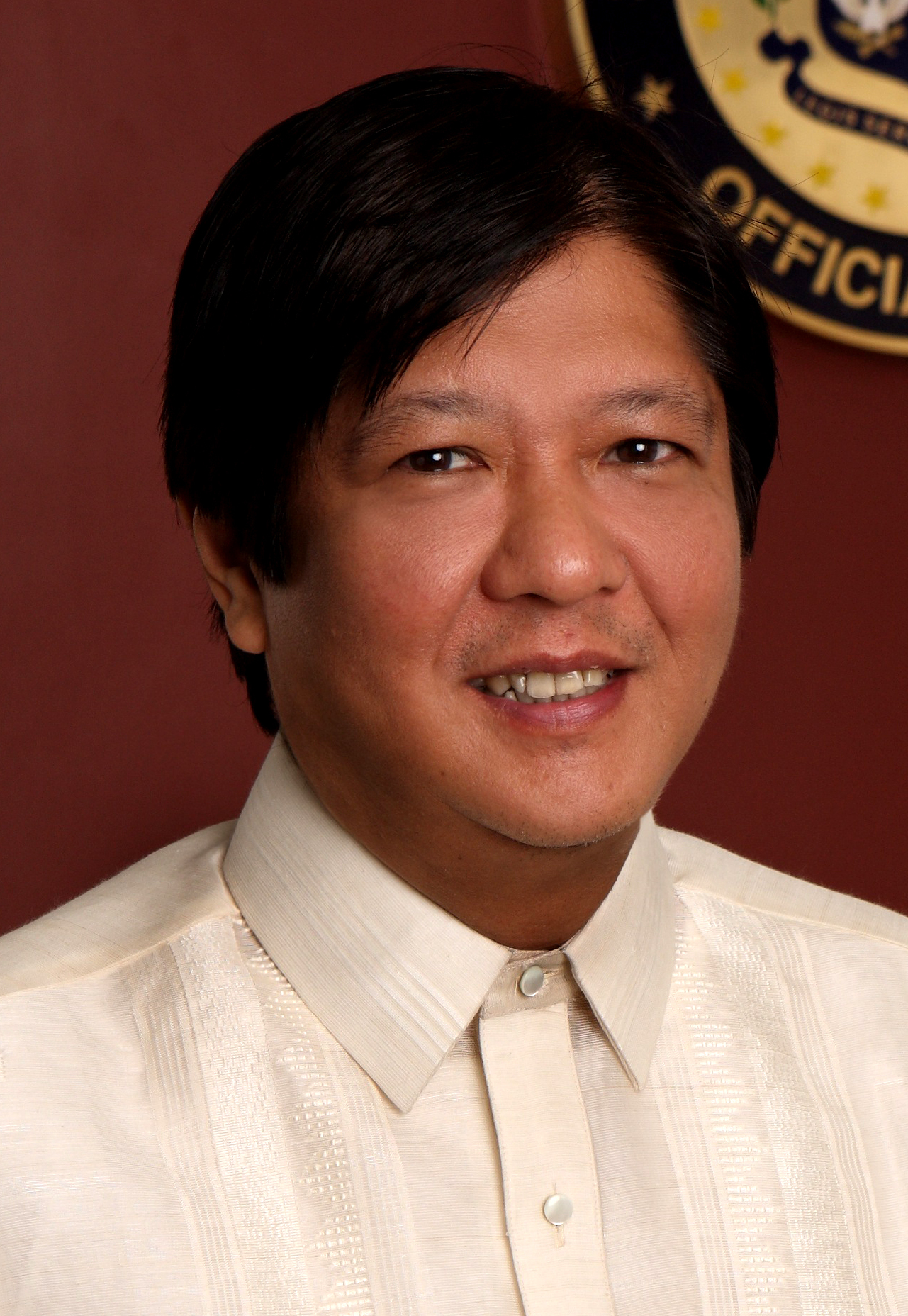
Candidate	Leni Robredo	Alan Peter Cayetano	Bongbong Marcos
Party	Liberal	Independent	Independent
Alliance	KDM
popular vote	101,141	51,528	42,336
Percentage	43.94%	22.38%	18.39%
Vice President before election
Jejomar Binay
UNA
Elected Vice President
Leni Robredo
Liberal

The 2016 Philippine presidential and vice presidential elections in Zamboanga Sibugay were held on Monday, May 9, 2016, as part of the 2016 Philippine general election in which all 81 provinces, all 145 cities, and all 1,489 municipalities participated. Voters voted the president and the vice president separately.

Davao City mayor Rodrigo Duterte won the province of Zamboanga Siugay and defeated DILG Secretary Mar Roxas, Senator Grace Poe, Vice president Jejomar Binay, and Senator Miriam Defensor Santiago by a clear margin in the presidential race.

Camarines Sur representative Leni Robredo won and defeated Senators Alan Peter Cayetano, Bongbong Marcos, Francis Escudero, Antonio Trillanes, and Gregorio Honasan.

This is the only province in the Zamboanga Peninsula in which Duterte won where Del Norte went to Roxas and Del Sur went to Poe.

== Electoral system ==
According to the Constitution of the Philippines, the elections are held every six years after 1992, on the second Monday of May. The incumbent president is term limited and ineligible for re-election. The incumbent vice president is eligible to run for re-election and may run for two consecutive terms. The plurality voting system is used to determine the winner: the candidate with the highest number of votes, whether or not one has a majority, wins the presidency. The vice presidential election is a separate election, is held on the same rules, and voters may split their ticket. Both winners will serve six-year terms commencing on the noon of June 30, 2016, and ending on the same day six years later.

== Candidates ==
List of Presidential and Vice Presidential candidates on the ballot
Presidential candidate		Vice presidential candidate		Campaign
Candidate name and party	Position	Candidate name and party	Position	Campaign
Jejomar Binay UNA	Vice President	Gregorio Honasan UNA	Senator	(campaign)
Miriam Defensor Santiago PRP	Senator	Bongbong Marcos Independent (Note: Cayetano, Marcos and Trillanes are all members of the Nacionalista Party, but failed to get that party's nomination; instead, all of them ran as independents.)	Senator	(campaign)
Rodrigo Duterte PDP–Laban	Mayor of Davao City	Alan Peter Cayetano Independent	Senator	(campaign)
Grace Poe Independent	Senator	Francis Escudero Independent	Senator	(campaign)
Mar Roxas Liberal	Former secretary of the Interior and Local Government	Leni Robredo Liberal	House representative from Camarines Sur's 3rd district	(campaign)
None		Antonio Trillanes Independent	Senator	

== Results ==
A total of 276,133 voters came out to vote out of the 350,699 registered voters in the province.

=== Presidential results ===
2016 Philippine presidential election in Zamboanga Sibugay (Note: The 194 votes for Roy Señeres are not listed here as they are deemed Invalid.)
Party	Candidate	Votes	%
PDP–Laban	Rodrigo Duterte	115,173	46.18%
Liberal	Mar Roxas	84,151	33.74%
Independent	Grace Poe	34,385	13.79%
UNA	Jejomar Binay	14,291	5.73%
PRP	Miriam Defensor Santiago	1,422	0.57
Total votes		249,422	100.00%

=== Vice presidential results ===
2016 Philippine vice presidential election in Zamboanga Sibugay
Party	Candidate	Votes	%
Liberal	Leni Robredo	101,141	43.94%
Independent	Alan Peter Cayetano	51,528	22.38%
Independent	Bongbong Marcos	42,336	18.39%
Independent	Francis Escudero	19,810	8.61%
Independent	Antonio Trillanes	8,952	3.89%
UNA	Gregorio Honasan	6,425	2.79%
Total votes		230,192	100.00%
