= 2007 Davao City local elections =

19th city elections in Davao City

2007 Davao City mayoral election
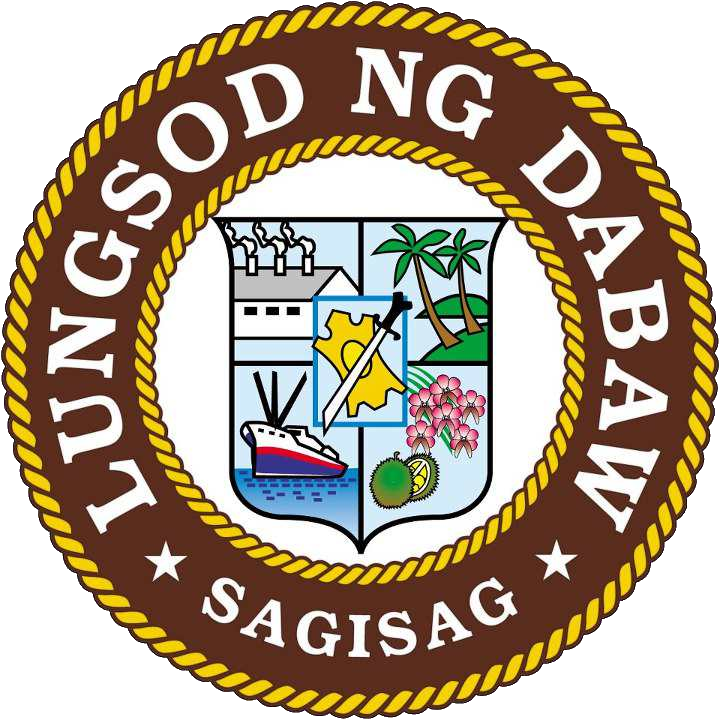
- May 14, 2007
- Mayoral election
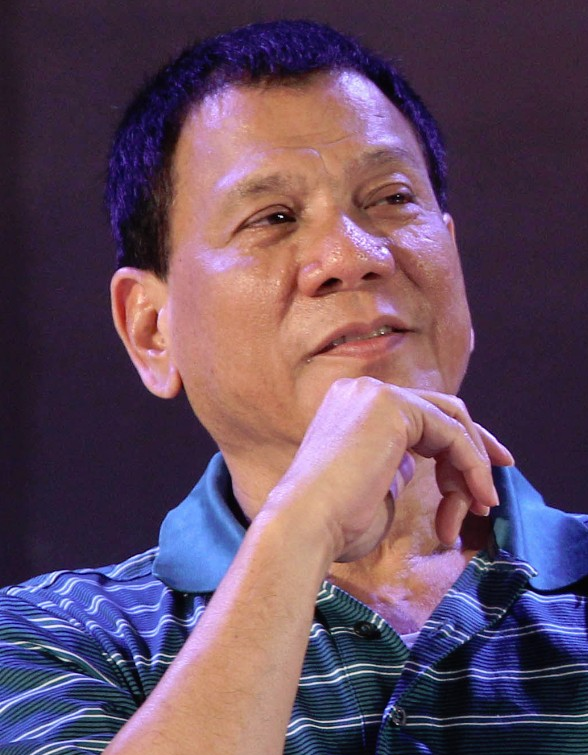
		IND
Candidate	Rodrigo Duterte	Justinian Joaquin
Party	PDP–Laban	Independent
Alliance	TEAM Unity
Popular vote	382,185	1,745
Percentage	98.68%	0.45%
Mayor before election
Rodrigo Duterte
PDP–Laban
Elected mayor
Rodrigo Duterte
PDP–Laban
- Vice Mayoral election
		GO
Candidate	Sara Duterte	Jeff Ho
Party	PDP–Laban	GO
Alliance	TEAM Unity	Genuine Opposition
Popular vote	338,095	42,216
Percentage	88.90%	11.10%
Vice Mayor before election
Luis C. Bonguyan
PDP–Laban
Elected Vice Mayor
Sara Duterte
PDP–Laban

Local elections were held in Davao City on May 14, 2007, within the Philippine general election. The voters elected for the elective local posts in the city: the mayor, vice mayor, three representatives, and twenty-four councilors, eight per district.

== Candidates ==
For Mayor
Candidate	Party
Rodrigo Duterte	PDP–Laban/TEAM Unity
Justinian Joaquin	Independent
Teodoro Mantilla	Independent
Henry Satera	Independent
Rodrigo Sulamin	Genuine Opposition

For Vice Mayor
Candidate	Party
Sara Duterte	PDP–Laban/TEAM Unity
Jeff Ho	Genuine Opposition

TEAM Unity (1st District)
Representative	Party
Prospero Nograles	Lakas–CMD
Councilors	Party
Nilo Abellera	PDP–Laban
Mabel Sunga-Acosta	PDP–Laban
Leo Avila III	Lakas–CMD
Pilar Braga	Lakas–CMD
Edgar Ibuyan	Lakas–CMD
Peter Laviña	PMP
Angela Librado-Trinidad	Bayan Muna
Bonifacio Militar	PMP

TEAM Unity (2nd District)
Representative	Party
Vincent Garcia	NPC
Councilors	Party
Samuel Bangoy	NPC
Louie John Bonguyan	PDP–Laban
Ricardo Cabling	PDP–Laban
Danilo Dayanghirang	Reporma-LM
Diosdado Mahipus	Lakas–CMD
Tomas Monteverde IV	NPC
Nenita Orcullo	PDP–Laban
Susan Isabel Reta	NPC

TEAM Unity (3rd District)
Representative	Party
Isidro Ungab	PMP
Councilors	Party
Victorio Advincula	Lakas–CMD
Wilberto Al-ag	PDP–Laban
Conrado Baluran	Independent
Myrna Dalodo-Ortiz	Lakas–CMD
Gregorio Pantig	Lakas–CMD
Jeppie Ramada	Bayan Muna
Jose Louie Villafuerte	Lakas–CMD
Rachel Zozobrado	Lakas–CMD

Other candidates (1st District)
Representative	Party
Edgar Mabilog	Independent
Anaclito Millendez	Genuine Opposition
Councilors	Party
Mary Grace Almendras	Independent
Rodolfo Antolin	Independent
Carlos Cirilo	Independent
Bernard Custodio	Independent
Edwin Garcia	Independent
Narciso Ner	Independent
Roger Paconla	Independent
Randy Ponteras	Akbayan

Other candidates (2nd District)
Representative	Party
Abelardo Aportadera Jr.	Genuine Opposition
Joel Batucan	Independent
Jimmy Dureza	Independent
Councilors	Party
Senforiano Alterado	PMP
Michael Aportadera	Independent
Dante Apostol	LDP
Linda Mediatrix Aquino	Independent
Fermin Arendain	PMP
Romeo Escamilla Jr.	Independent
Arlex Galido	Independent
Dominador Lopez	Independent
Joji Lumanog	Independent

Other candidates (3rd District)
Representative	Party
Benjamin de Guzman	LDP/Genuine Opposition
Rene Elias Lopez	NPC
Sonja Rodriguez	Independent
Councilors	Party
Terso Abrantes	Independent
Ronald Banac	Independent
Karlo Bello	Independent
Allan Dolor	PMP
Gertrudes Giangan	LDP
Ramon Lasay	Independent
Samuel Lasay	Anakpawis
Teresita Mata	Reporma–LM
Rogelio Montajes	Independent
Reynaldo Reyes	PMP

== Results ==
=== For Mayor ===
Incumbent Mayor Rodrigo Duterte won the elections against four candidates, including DXOW broadcaster Justinian Joaquin.

2007 Davao City mayoral election
Candidate	Party	Votes	%
Rodrigo Duterte	PDP–Laban	382,185	98.68
Justinian Joaquin	Independent	1,745	0.45
Teodoro Mantilla	Independent	1,668	0.43
Rodrigo Sulamin	Genuine Opposition	1,047	0.27
Henry Satera	Independent	648	0.17
Total		387,293	100.00
PDP–Laban hold			
Source: COMELEC

=== For Vice Mayor ===
Mayor Duterte's eldest daughter, Sara Duterte won the elections against Dr. Jeff Ho.

2007 Davao City vice mayoral election
Candidate	Party	Votes	%
Sara Duterte	PDP–Laban	338,095	88.90
Jeff Ho	Genuine Opposition	42,216	11.10
Total		380,311	100.00
PDP–Laban hold			
Source: COMELEC

=== District Representatives ===
==== First District ====
2007 Philippine House of Representatives election in the Davao City's 1st district
Candidate	Party	Votes	%
Prospero Nograles	Lakas–CMD	114,896	90.42
Anacleto Millendez	Genuine Opposition	6,869	5.41
Edar Mabilog	Independent	5,300	4.17
Total		127,065	100.00
Lakas–CMD hold			
Source: COMELEC

==== Second District ====
2007 Philippine House of Representatives election in the 2nd District of Davao City
Candidate	Party	Votes	%
Vincent Garcia	Nationalist People's Coalition	65,642	51.10
Jimmy Dureza	Independent	39,948	31.10
Abelardo Aportadera Jr.	Genuine Opposition	22,543	17.55
Joel Batucan	Independent	336	0.26
Total		128,469	100.00
Nationalist People's Coalition hold			
Source: COMELEC

==== Third District ====
2007 Philippine House of Representatives election in the 3rd District of Davao City
Candidate	Party	Votes	%
Isidro Ungab	Pwersa ng Masang Pilipino	49,264	43.14
Rene Elias Lopez	Nationalist People's Coalition	28,710	25.14
Benjamin de Guzman	Laban ng Demokratikong Pilipino	20,102	17.60
Sonja Rodriguez	Independent	16,119	14.12
Total		114,195	100.00
Pwersa ng Masang Pilipino hold			
Source: COMELEC

=== City Council elections ===
Each of Davao City's three legislative districts elects eight councilors to the City Council. The eight candidates with the highest number of votes wins the seats per district.

==== 1st District ====
2007 Davao City Council election – 1st district
Candidate	Party	Votes	%
Mabel Acosta	PDP–Laban	119,312	12.66
Leonardo Avila III	Lakas–CMD	110,592	11.74
Pilar Braga	Lakas–CMD	105,068	11.15
Angela Librado-Trinidad	Bayan Muna	101,121	10.73
Peter Laviña	Pwersa ng Masang Pilipino	97,395	10.34
Bonifacio Militar	Pwersa ng Masang Pilipino	95,220	10.11
Nilo Abellera	PDP–Laban	93,140	9.89
Edgar Ibuyan	Lakas–CMD	92,020	9.77
Randy Ponteras	Akbayan	34,738	3.69
Mary Grace Almendras	Independent	29,322	3.11
Edwin Garcia	Independent	17,328	1.84
Bernard Custodio	Independent	12,108	1.29
Carlos Cirillo	Independent	9,491	1.01
Narciso Ner	Independent	9,361	0.99
Rodolfo Antolin	Independent	9,105	0.97
Roger Paconla	Independent	6,849	0.73
Total		942,170	100.00
Source: COMELEC

==== 2nd District ====
2007 Davao City Council election – 2nd district
Candidate	Party	Votes	%
Louie John Bonguyan	PDP–Laban	84,500	9.89
Diosdado Mahipus	Lakas–CMD	79,419	9.29
Danilo Dayanghirang	Partido para sa Demokratikong Reporma	78,151	9.15
Dante Apostol	Laban ng Demokratikong Pilipino	72,524	8.49
Samuel Bangoy	Nationalist People's Coalition	71,004	8.31
Arnolfo Ricardo Cabling	PDP–Laban	67,694	7.92
Tomas Monteverde IV	Nationalist People's Coalition	67,654	7.92
Susan Isabel Reta	Nationalist People's Coalition	65,998	7.72
Nenita Orcullo	PDP–Laban	64,882	7.59
Joji Jude Lumanog	Independent	60,921	7.13
Michael Aportadera	Independent	43,152	5.05
Senforiano Alterado	Pwersa ng Masang Pilipino	41,936	4.91
Dominador Lopez	Independent	24,954	2.92
Linda Mediatrix Aquino	Independent	21,104	2.47
Arlex Galido	Independent	4,912	0.57
Fermin Arendain	Pwersa ng Masang Pilipino	3,680	0.43
Romeo Escanilla Jr.	Independent	2,065	0.24
Total		854,550	100.00
Source: COMELEC

==== 3rd District ====
2007 Davao City Council election – 3rd district
Candidate	Party	Votes	%
Myrna Dalodo-Ortiz	Lakas–CMD	75,039	10.48
Wilberto Al-ag	PDP–Laban	69,536	9.71
Victorio Advincula	Lakas–CMD	64,655	9.03
Rachel Zozobrado	Lakas–CMD	63,140	8.82
Karlo Bello	Independent	62,150	8.68
Jose Louie Villafuerte	Lakas–CMD	61,212	8.55
Conrado Baluran	Independent	61,158	8.54
Teresita Mata	Partido para sa Demokratikong Reporma	54,892	7.67
Alan Dolor	Pwersa ng Masang Pilipino	49,176	6.87
Jeppie Ramada	Bayan Muna	46,411	6.48
Gregorio Pantig	Lakas–CMD	41,871	5.85
Reynaldo Reyes	Pwersa ng Masang Pilipino	35,535	4.96
Terso Arbantes	Independent	14,251	1.99
Ramon Lasay	Independent	5,232	0.73
Samuel Lasay	Anakpawis	5,005	0.70
Gertrudes Giangan	Laban ng Demokratikong Pilipino	4,116	0.57
Ronald Banac	Independent	1,633	0.23
Rogelio Montajes	Independent	1,088	0.15
Total		716,100	100.00
Source: COMELEC
