= List of historical markers of the Philippines in the Davao Region =

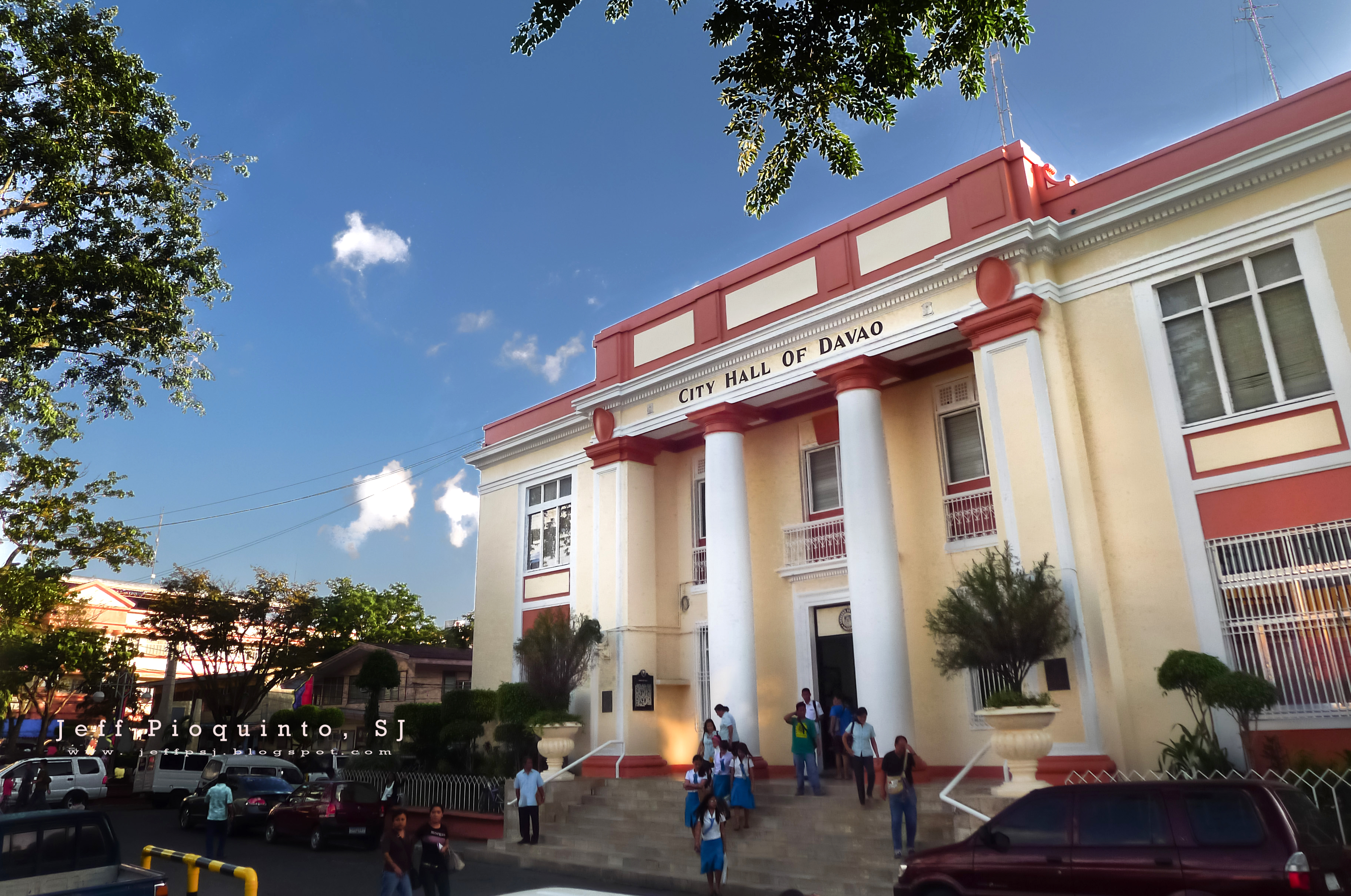
Davao City Hall and marker

This list of historical markers installed by the National Historical Commission of the Philippines (NHCP) in Davao Region (Region XI) is an annotated list of people, places, or events in the region that have been commemorated by cast-iron plaques issued by the said commission. The plaques themselves are permanent signs installed in publicly visible locations on buildings, monuments, or in special locations.

While many Cultural Properties have historical markers installed, not all places marked with historical markers are designated into one of the particular categories of Cultural Properties.

This article lists nine markers from the Davao Region, including two that are part of the Quincentennial historical markers series.

== Davao del Norte ==
This table lists one marker from the province of Davao del Norte.

Marker title	Description	Location	Language	Date issued	Image
Davao Penal Colony	Established on January 21, 1932. First penal colony founded under the administration of a Filipino director of prisons, Lt. Col. Paulino Santos.	Carmen	English	1956	

== Davao del Sur ==
This table lists four markers from the province of Davao del Sur, including Davao City, which is politically independent, but usually geographically grouped with the province.

Marker title	Description	Location	Language	Date issued	Image
Andres Bonifacio (30 Nobyembre 1863 – 10 Mayo 1897) (Note: Andrés Bonifacio (30 November 1863 – 10 May 1897))	The founder of the Katipunan. Sought the unification of the islands and gain independence from Spain through armed revolution.	Toril Park, Davao City	Filipino	December 4, 2013	
Davao City Hall	Built in 1926. Reconstructed in 1947 after the damages of World War II.	Davao City Hall building, Davao City	Filipino	November 17, 2012	
Ohta Kyozaburo	Japanese immigrant who established the Ohta Development Company, the first abaca company by the Japanese in the Philippines.	Mintal, Davao City	Filipino	August 25, 2003	
Port Sta. Ana	First port used by the first Japanese agricultural workers of Davao.	Magsaysay Park, Davao City		August 25, 2003	

== Davao de Oro ==
This are no markers from the province of Davao de Oro.

== Davao Occidental ==
This table lists three markers from the province of Davao Occidental.

Marker title	Description	Location	Language	Date issued	Image
Candighar (Balut); Ruta ng Ekspedisyong Magallanes–Elcano sa Pilipinas (Note: Candighar (Balut): Route of the Magellan-Elcano Expedition in the Philippines)	From Biraham Batolach (approximately Batulaki, Glan), the expedition went here.	Sarangani	Filipino	October 27, 2021	
Mga Guho ng Tanggulan ng Marorong (Note: Ruins of the Marorong Fort)	Built as part of Balut detachment, watching over Celebes Sea.	Marorong Islet, Sarangani, Davao Occidental	Filipino	June 22, 2022	
Sarangani; Ruta ng Ekspedisyong Magallanes–Elcano sa Pilipinas (Note: Sarangani:Route of the Magellan–Elcano Expedition in the Philippines)	Last point in the archipelago where the expedition went before going to Maluku.	Sarangani	Filipino	October 28, 2021	

== Davao Oriental ==
This table lists one marker from the province of Davao Oriental.

Marker title	Description	Location	Language	Date issued	Image
Simbahan ng Caraga (Note: Caraga Church)	Built of wood, corals, and stone by Jesuit Father Pablo Pastells, with the help of Fr. Juan Terricabras. Became a center for Jesuit missions.	Caraga	Filipino	July 16, 2012	

== See also ==
- List of Cultural Properties of the Philippines in the Davao Region

== Bibliography ==
- National Historical Institute (1994). Historical Markers: Regions V-XIII. National Historical Institute.
- National Historical Institute (2008). Historical Markers (1992 - 2006). National Historical Institute.
- A list of sites and structures with historical markers, as of 16 January 2012
- A list of institutions with historical markers, as of 16 January 2012
