= Mylene Garcia-Albano =

Ambassador of the Philippines to Japan since 2022

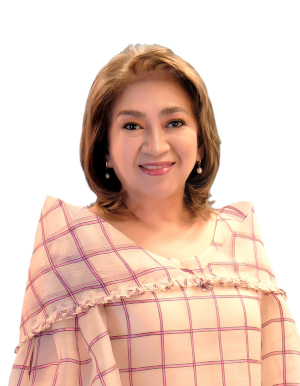
- Garcia-Albano in 2022

Ambassador of the Philippines to Japan
- Incumbent
- Assumed office August 12, 2022
- President: Bongbong Marcos
- Preceded by: Robespierre Bolivar

Deputy Speaker of the House of Representatives of the Philippines
- In office August 15, 2016 – June 30, 2019
- Speaker: Pantaleon Alvarez; Gloria Macapagal Arroyo

Member of Philippine House of Representatives for Davao City's 2nd district
- In office June 30, 2010 – June 30, 2019
- Preceded by: Vincent Garcia
- Succeeded by: Vincent Garcia
House positions
Chair of the House Committee on Constitutional Amendments
In office July 24, 2013 – June 30, 2016
Preceded by	Loreto Leo Ocampos
Succeeded by	Roger Mercado
House Assistant Majority Leader
In office August 2, 2010 – June 30, 2013
Leader	Neptali Gonzales II

Personal details
- Born: Mylene de Joya Garcia; June 20, 1960 (age 66)
- Party: Independent (2009–2010; 2019–present)
- Other political affiliations: PDP–Laban (2016–2019); Liberal (2010–2016)
- Spouse: Rodolfo Albano III
- Children: 1
- Relatives: Vincent Garcia (brother)
- Education: Marymount California University; George Washington University (AB); Ateneo de Manila University (LLB)

Mylene de Joya Garcia-Albano (born June 20, 1960) is a Filipino lawyer, diplomat, and politician who has served as the ambassador of the Philippines to Japan since 2022, becoming the first woman in Philippine history to hold the position. She previously served as a representative for Davao City's 2nd congressional district in the Philippine House of Representatives from 2010 to 2019, and concurrently as House deputy speaker from 2016 to 2019.

== Early life and education ==
Mylene de Joya Garcia was born on June 20, 1960, to Manuel Garcia and Linda de Joya. She attended Marymount California University, where she earned an Associate of Arts degree in liberal arts in 1980, and George Washington University, where she earned a Bachelor of Arts degree in political science. She later attended the Ateneo de Manila University College of Law, where she graduated with second honors in 1990 and served as the student government's first female president from 1989 to 1990.

== Early career ==
After passing the Bar examinations, Garcia-Albano worked at the Ponce Enrile Cayetano Reyes & Manalastas Law Offices and later at the Villareal Law Offices. Before entering politics, she also served as chief of staff to Senator Mar Roxas, assistant secretary for Local Government Affairs and Legal Affairs at the Department of Environment and Natural Resources (DENR), executive director of the DENR's Land Administration and Management Project, and legal assistant in the office of Chief Presidential Legal Counsel Rene Cayetano.

== House of Representatives (2010–2019) ==
=== First term (2010–2013) ===
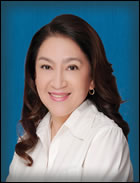
Official portrait of Garcia-Albano in the 17th Congress

Garcia-Albano was elected to the House of Representatives in 2010 as an independent, representing Davao City's 2nd congressional district. During the 15th Congress, she served as assistant majority leader and a member of the House Committee on Rules, vice chairperson of the committees on National Cultural Communities, Reforestation, and Women and Gender Equality, and a member of nine other committees as part of the majority bloc. By the end of her first term, she had principally authored 13 bills and co-authored 64 others.

=== Second term (2013–2016) ===
In 2013, Garcia-Albano was re-elected under the Liberal Party. Her re-election bid was notably backed by Kris Aquino, the sister of President Benigno Aquino III.

During the 16th Congress, Garcia-Albano was elected chairperson of the House Committee on Constitutional Amendments.

=== Third term (2016–2019) ===
Garcia-Albano defended her seat in 2016, winning with 148,509 votes against independent candidate Christopher Abierra, who received 16,455 votes. Before the start of the 17th Congress, she joined the ruling party, PDP–Laban.

On August 15, 2016, she was elected deputy speaker under Speaker Pantaleon Alvarez.

=== Committee membership ===
==== 17th Congress ====
- Ex-officio member of all standing committees as deputy speaker

==== 16th Congress ====
- Committee on Constitutional Amendments (Chair)
- Committee on Natural Resources (Vice Chair)
- Committee on Agriculture and Food
- Committee on Economic Affairs
- Committee on Games and Amusements
- Committee on Interparliamentary Relations and Diplomacy
- Committee on Mindanao Affairs
- Committee on National Cultural Communities
- Committee on Tourism

==== 15th Congress ====
- Committee on National Cultural Communities (Vice Chair)
- Special Committee on Reforestation (Vice Chair)
- Committee on Women and Gender Equality (Vice Chair)
- Committee on Rules (Assistant Majority Leader)
- Committee on Energy
- Committee on Games and Amusements
- Committee on Housing and Urban Development
- Committee on Interparliamentary Relations and Diplomacy
- Committee on Justice
- Committee on Mindanao Affairs
- Committee on National Defense and Security
- Committee on Natural Resources
- Committee on Tourism

== Ambassador of the Philippines to Japan (2022–present) ==
On August 12, 2022, President Bongbong Marcos appointed Garcia-Albano as the first female Philippine ambassador to Japan. Her husband, Isabela governor Rodolfo Albano III, stated in 2025 that he had requested the appointment from Marcos.

== Personal life ==
Garcia-Albano is married to Rodolfo Albano III, with whom she has a son. She is the sister of former representative Vincent Garcia.

== Electoral history ==
Electoral history of Mylene Garcia-Albano
Year	Office	Party	Votes received				Result
Year	Office	Party	Total	%	P.	Swing	Result
2010	Representative (Davao City–2nd)	Independent	61,887	34.34%	1st	—N/a	Won
2013	Representative (Davao City–2nd)	Liberal	—N/a	—N/a	1st	—N/a	Won
2016	Representative (Davao City–2nd)	Liberal	148,509	90.03%	1st	—N/a	Won

House of Representatives of the Philippines
Preceded by Vincent Garcia	Member of the Philippine House of Representatives for Davao City's 2nd congressional district 2010–2019	Succeeded by Vincent Garcia
Diplomatic posts
Preceded by Robespierre Bolivar	Ambassador of the Philippines to Japan; 2022–present	Incumbent
