= 2022 Davao City local elections =

24th city elections in Davao City

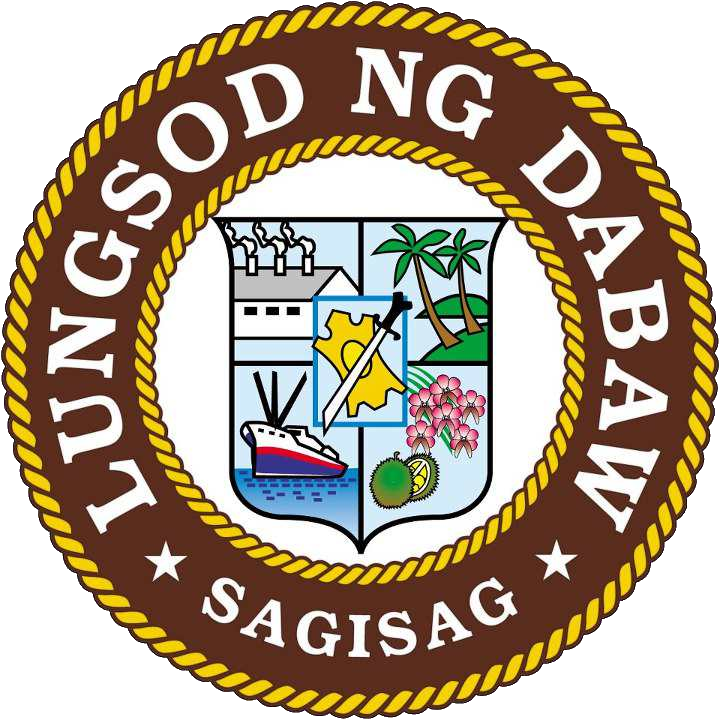
- May 9, 2022
- Mayoral election
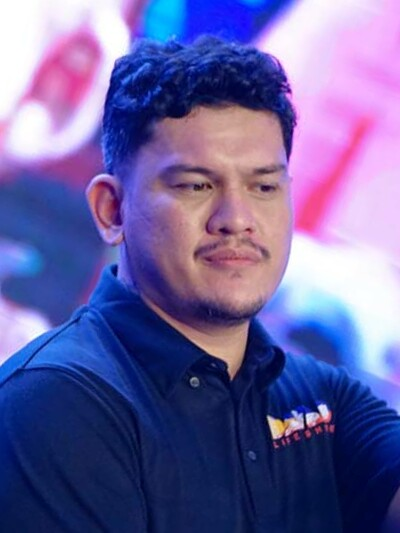

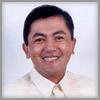
Candidate	Sebastian Duterte	Ruy Elias C. Lopez
Party	Hugpong	Independent
Alliance	Uniteam
Running mate	J. Melchor Quitain Jr.
popular vote	621,766	70,322
Percentage	89.29%	10.09%
Mayor before election
Sara Duterte
Hugpong
Elected mayor
Sebastian Duterte
Hugpong
- Vice mayoral election
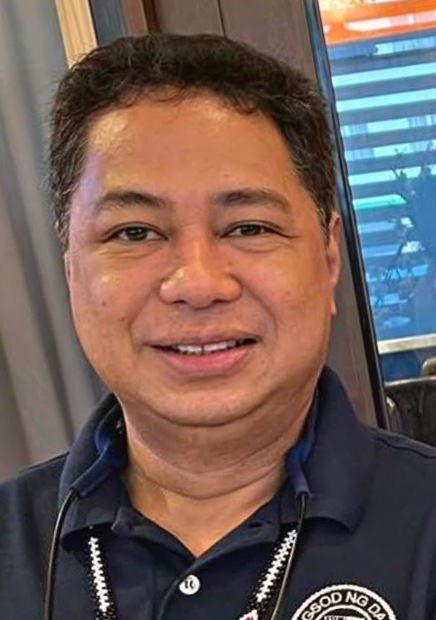
Candidate	J. Melchor Quitain Jr.
Party	Hugpong
Alliance	Uniteam
popular vote	561,976
Percentage	100.00%
Vice Mayor before election
Sebastian Duterte
Hugpong
Elected Vice Mayor
J. Melchor Quitain Jr.
Hugpong

Local elections were held in Davao City on May 9, 2022, as part of the 2022 Philippine general election. The city electorate elected a mayor, a vice mayor, 24 members of the Davao City Council, and three district representatives to the House of Representatives.

== Background ==
Davao City, the largest city in Mindanao, the third most populous urban center in the Philippines and the largest city by land area, has been ruled by the Duterte family and their allies for most of the past four decades. The city has served as the political base for the dynasty since the first post-EDSA elections in 1988, when Rodrigo Duterte was first elected city mayor.

These 2022 elections marked a significant change in Davao City politics, when incumbent mayor Sara Duterte initially ran for a third term under her party, Hugpong ng Pagbabago but ran for Vice President of the Philippines under Lakas–CMD. This paved the way for her brother and incumbent vice mayor Sebastian Duterte to run for Mayor as he substituted her sister.

Sebastian Duterte became the 3rd Duterte to become mayor of Davao City after his sister, Sara and father, Rodrigo.

== Electoral system ==
Local elections in the Philippines are held every second Monday of May, every three years starting in 1992. Single-seat positions (mayor, vice mayor and district representative) are elected via first-past-the-post-voting. The mayor and vice mayor are elected by the city at-large, while the House representative and city councilors are elected per district.

City council elections are done via plurality block voting; for the Davao City Council, the city is divided into three districts, with each district sending eight councilors. There are two other ex officio seats representing the Sangguniang Kabataan Federation and the Association of Barangay Captains; these will be determined later following the barangay and Sangguniang Kabataan elections.

== Candidates ==
=== Administration candidates (HNP/HTL) ===
Team Duterte-Quintain Jr.
Position	#	Candidate	Party
Mayor	1.	Sebastian Duterte	Hugpong
Vice mayor	1.	Jesus Melchor Quintain Jr.	Hugpong
1st district representative	1.	Paolo Duterte	Hugpong
1st district councilor	2.	Luna Acosta	Hugpong
1st district councilor	3.	Bernie Al-Ag	Hugpong
1st district councilor	6.	Pilar Braga	Hugpong
1st district councilor	7.	Reolsyl Caingles	Hugpong
1st district councilor	8.	Richard Duterte	Hugpong
1st district councilor	10.	Kap Ibuyan	Hugpong
1st district councilor	12.	Bonz Militar	Hugpong
1st district councilor	13.	Tek Ocampo	Hugpong
1st district councilor	15.	Tambi Sarenas	Hugpong
2nd district representative	1.	Danny Dayanghirang	Hugpong
2nd district representative	3.	Vincent Garcia	Hugpong
2nd district councilor	2.	Marissa Abella	Hugpong
2nd district councilor	3.	Al Ryan Alejandre	Hugpong
2nd district councilor	4.	Dante Apostol	Hugpong
2nd district councilor	7.	Louie John Bonguyan	Hugpong
2nd district councilor	9.	Javi Garcia Campos	Hugpong
2nd district councilor	10.	Danilo Dayanghirang II	Hugpong
2nd district councilor	11.	Jonard Dayap	Hugpong
2nd district councilor	13.	Che Che Justol	Hugpong
2nd district councilor	14.	Diosdado Mahipus	Hugpong
3rd district representative	2.	Isidro Ungab	Hugpong
3rd district councilor	1.	Sweet Advincula	Hugpong
3rd district councilor	2.	Nonoy Al-Ag	Hugpong
3rd district councilor	3.	Conde Baluran	Hugpong
3rd district councilor	4.	Carmelo Clarion	Hugpong
3rd district councilor	5.	Myrna Dalodo-Ortiz	Hugpong
3rd district councilor	6.	Melba Principe	Hugpong
3rd district councilor	7.	Alberto Ungab	Hugpong
3rd district councilor	8.	Potpot Villafuerte	Hugpong
3rd district councilor	9.	Enzo Villafuerte	Hugpong
3rd district councilor	10.	Cocoy Zozobrado	Hugpong

=== Dropped administration candidates (HNP/HTL) ===
Dropped administration candidates (Note: Showed as under Hugpong ng Pagbabago (HNP) and Hugpong sa Tawong Lungsod (HTL), respectively on the ballots but had their certificates of nomination and acceptance withdrawn from the party.)
Position	#	Candidate	Party
1st district councilor	1.	Nilo Abellera Jr.	Hugpong
1st district councilor	11.	Pamela Librado (withdrew)	Hugpong

=== Independents ===
Independent candidates
Position	#	Candidate	Party
Mayor	2.	Joseph Hannibal Elizalde	Independent
Mayor	3.	Ruy Elias Lopez	Independent
Mayor	4.	Teddy Mantilla	Independent
1st district representative	2.	Jamal Kanan	Independent
1st district representative	3.	Mags Maglana	Independent
1st district representative	4.	Jovanie Mantawel	Independent
1st district councilor	4.	Lyndon Banzon	Independent
1st district councilor	5.	Jessica Bonguyan	Independent
1st district councilor	16.	Ismael Veloso Jr.	Independent
2nd district representative	2.	Alberto Dulong	Independent
2nd district councilor	1.	Reyvan Abad	Independent
2nd district councilor	5.	Eller Bantugan	Independent
2nd district councilor	6.	Bong Batenga	Independent
2nd district councilor	12.	Chris Galang	Independent
2nd district councilor	15.	Coach Pao Salvador	Independent
3rd district representative	1.	Abundio Indonilla	Independent

=== Partido Pilipino sa Pagbabago (PPP) ===
Partido Pilipino sa Pagbabago candidates
Position	#	Candidate	Party
1st district councilor	9.	Allan Halog	PPP
1st district councilor	14.	Randy Ponteras	PPP

=== Reform Party (RP) ===
Reform Party candidates
Position	#	Candidate	Party
2nd district councilor	8.	Joel Bustamante	Reform

== Mayoral election ==
Initially incumbent mayor Sara Duterte ran for re-election to a third and last term but withdrew on November 9, 2021, to run for vice president of the Philippines on November 13, 2021. Her brother and incumbent vice mayor since 2019, Sebastian Duterte substituted her in the mayoral election. Sebastian Duterte was proclaimed winner of the mayoral election by COMELEC Davao City on May 11, 2022. Duterte won a landslide victory against 3 other candidates.

=== Candidates ===
- Sebastian Duterte (Hugpong ng Pagbabago), incumbent vice mayor of Davao City since 2019
- Joseph Hannibal Elizalde (Independent), medical doctor
- Ruy Elias C. Lopez (Independent), representative of Davao City's 3rd congressional district from 1998–2007 and son of former mayor Elias B. Lopez
- Teddy Mantilla (Independent)

=== Results ===
2022 Davao City mayoral election
Candidate	Party	Votes	%
Sebastian Duterte	Hugpong ng Pagbabago	621,766	89.30
Ruy Elias C. Lopez	Independent	70,322	10.10
Joseph Hannibal Elizalde	Independent	3,144	0.45
Teddy Mantilla	Independent	1,051	0.15
Total		696,283	100.00
Total votes		737,371	–
Registered voters/turnout		992,538	74.29
HNP gain from Lakas–CMD			
Source: Commission on Elections

== Vice mayoral election ==
Initially incumbent vice mayor Sebastian Duterte ran for re-election to a second term but withdrew on November 9, 2022 to substitute his sister and incumbent mayor, Sara Duterte who ran for vice president. Sebastian Duterte was substituted by incumbent councilor J. Melchor Quintain Jr. Quintain ran unopposed.

=== Candidates ===
- Jesus Melchor Quintain Jr. (Hugpong sa Tawong Lungsod), incumbent councilor from Davao City's 1st district since 2016

=== Results ===
2022 Davao City vice mayoral election
Candidate	Party	Votes	%
J. Melchor Quitain Jr.	Hugpong sa Tawong Lungsod	561,976	100.00
Total		561,976	100.00
Total votes		737,371	–
Registered voters/turnout		992,538	74.29
HTL gain from HNP			
Source: Commission on Elections

== Congressional elections ==
=== First district ===
Incumbent representative Paolo Duterte ran for re-election to a second term, he faced 3 other candidates.

==== Candidates ====
- Paolo Duterte (Hugpong ng Pagbabago), incumbent representative of the district since 2019, vice mayor of Davao City from 2013–2018, and councilor from 2008–2013
- Jamal Kanan (Independent), businessman and CEO of a recruitment agency
- Mags Maglana (Independent), NGO worker
- Jovanie Mantawel (Independent)

==== Results ====
2022 Davao City's 1st congressional district election
Candidate	Party	Votes	%
Paolo Duterte (incumbent)	Hugpong ng Pagbabago	224,008	92.94
Mags Maglana	Independent	14,914	6.19
Jamal Kanan	Independent	1,432	0.59
Jovanie Mantawel	Independent	683	0.28
Total		241,037	100.00
Total votes		259,451	–
Registered voters/turnout		355,052	73.07
HNP hold			
Source: Commission on Elections

=== Second district ===
Incumbent representative Vincent Garcia ran for re-election to a second term, he previously served the position from 2001 to 2010. Garcia faced incumbent councilor Danny Dayanghirang and 1 other candidate.

==== Candidates ====
- Danny Dayanghirang (Hugpong sa Tawong Lungsod), incumbent councilor since 2013, 2001–2007, 1988–1999, and (OIC 1986–1988)
- Alberto Dulong (Independent)
- Vincent Garcia (Hugpong ng Pagbabago), incumbent representative since 2019 and previously from 2001–2010

==== Results ====
2022 Davao City's 2nd congressional district election
Candidate	Party	Votes	%
Vincent Garcia (incumbent)	Hugpong ng Pagbabago	159,702	67.70
Danny Dayanghirang	Hugpong sa Tawong Lungsod	73,796	31.28
Alberto Dulong	Independent	2,415	1.02
Total		235,913	100.00
Total votes		257,891	–
Registered voters/turnout		354,747	72.70
HNP hold			
Source: Commission on Elections

=== Third district ===
Incumbent representative Isidro Ungab ran for re-election to a second term, he previously served the position from 2007 to 2016. he faced only one candidate, Abundio Indonilla.

==== Candidates ====
- Abundio Indonilla (Independent)
- Isidro Ungab (Hugpong ng Pagbabago), incumbent representative since 2019 and previously from 2007–2016, and councilor from 1995–2004

==== Results ====
2022 Davao City's 3rd congressional district election
Candidate	Party	Votes	%
Isidro Ungab (incumbent)	Hugpong ng Pagbabago	180,286	97.81
Abundio Indonilla	Independent	4,043	2.19
Total		184,329	100.00
Total votes		220,029	–
Registered voters/turnout		282,739	77.82
HNP hold			
Source: Commission on Elections

== City Council elections ==
The Davao City Council is composed of 26 councilors, 24 of whom are elected.

=== Summary ===
2022 Davao City Council election results summary
Party	Votes	%	Seats	+/–
Hugpong ng Pagbabago	1,984,693	47.12	13	–6
Hugpong sa Tawong Lungsod	1,852,573	43.98	10	+6
Partido Pilipino sa Pagbabago	41,979	1.00	0	New
Reform Party	28,075	0.67	0	New
Independent	304,903	7.24	1	0
Ex officio seats			2	–
Total	4,212,223	100.00	26	0
Total votes	737,371	–		
Registered voters/turnout	992,538	74.29		
HNP remains largest party				

=== First district ===
The first city council district, co-terminous with Davao City's 1st congressional district, is composed of the administrative districts of Poblacion and Talomo (54 barangays). Eight councilors are elected by this district.

16 candidates were included in the ballot. Four out of five incumbents successfully defended their seats. Incumbent councilor Pamela Librado withdrew from the election on February 25, 2022 after she was dropped by the administration slate.

==== Results ====
2022 Davao City 1st district council election
Candidate	Party	Votes	%
Kap Ibuyan (incumbent)	Hugpong ng Pagbabago	156,764	10.37
Luna Acosta	Hugpong ng Pagbabago	153,835	10.17
Jessica Bonguyan (incumbent)	Independent	146,458	9.69
Tek Ocampo	Hugpong ng Pagbabago	144,502	9.56
Bernie Al-ag	Hugpong ng Pagbabago	141,273	9.34
Bonz Militar	Hugpong sa Tawong Lungsod	138,891	9.19
Pilar Braga (incumbent)	Hugpong sa Tawong Lungsod	132,506	8.76
Nilo Abellera Jr. (incumbent)	Hugpong ng Pagbabago	103,383	6.84
Richard Duterte	Hugpong sa Tawong Lungsod	101,868	6.74
Tambi Sarenas	Hugpong sa Tawong Lungsod	86,777	5.74
Pamela Librado (incumbent) (Note: Withdrew from the election on February 25, 2022)	Hugpong sa Tawong Lungsod	65,442	4.33
Lyndon Banzon	Independent	48,144	3.18
Reolsyl Caingles	Hugpong ng Pagbabago	36,365	2.41
Randy Ponteras	Partido Pilipino sa Pagbabago	27,029	1.79
Allan Halog	Partido Pilipino sa Pagbabago	14,950	0.99
Ismael Veloso Jr.	Independent	13,779	0.91
Total		1,511,966	100.00
Total votes		259,451	–
Registered voters/turnout		355,052	73.07
HNP hold majority			
Source: Commission on Elections

=== Second district ===
The second city council district, co-terminous with Davao City's 2nd congressional district, is composed of the administrative districts of Agdao, Buhangin, Bunawan and Paquibato (46 barangays). Eight councilors are elected by this district.

15 candidates were included in the ballot. All five incumbents successfully defended their seats.

==== Results ====
2022 Davao City 2nd district council election
Candidate	Party	Votes	%
Che Che Justol	Hugpong sa Tawong Lungsod	175,678	11.62
Javi Garcia Campos (incumbent)	Hugpong ng Pagbabago	172,795	11.43
Louie John Bonguyan (incumbent)	Hugpong ng Pagbabago	164,401	10.88
Dante Apostol (incumbent)	Hugpong sa Tawong Lungsod	153,960	10.19
Diosdado Mahipus (incumbent)	Hugpong sa Tawong Lungsod	152,160	10.07
Jonard Dayap (incumbent)	Hugpong ng Pagbabago	150,707	9.97
Marissa Abella	Hugpong sa Tawong Lungsod	148,333	9.81
Al Ryan Alejandre	Hugpong sa Tawong Lungsod	137,896	9.12
Danilo Dayanghirang II	Hugpong ng Pagbabago	130,926	8.66
Pao Salvador	Independent	35,853	2.37
Joel Bustamante	Reform Party	28,075	1.86
Reyvan Abad	Independent	24,174	1.60
Eller Bantugan	Independent	17,653	1.17
Bong Batenga	Independent	10,293	0.68
Chris Galang	Independent	8,549	0.57
Total		1,511,453	100.00
Total votes		257,891	–
Registered voters/turnout		354,747	72.70
HTL gain majority from HNP			
Source: Commission on Elections

=== Third district ===
The third city council district, co-terminous with Davao City's 3rd congressional district, is composed of the administrative districts of Baguio, Calinan, Marilog, Toril and Tugbok (82 barangays). Eight councilors are elected in this district.

10 candidates were included in the ballot. All six incumbents successfully defended their seats.

2022 Davao City 3rd district council election
Candidate	Party	Votes	%
Alberto Ungab (incumbent)	Hugpong ng Pagbabago	160,241	13.48
Nonoy Al-ag (incumbent)	Hugpong sa Tawong Lungsod	137,185	11.54
Potpot Villafuerte	Hugpong ng Pagbabago	123,921	10.42
Myrna Dalodo-Ortiz (incumbent)	Hugpong ng Pagbabago	120,816	10.16
Sweet Advincula (incumbent)	Hugpong sa Tawong Lungsod	120,335	10.12
Cocoy Zozobrado (incumbent)	Hugpong ng Pagbabago	119,625	10.06
Conde Baluran (incumbent)	Hugpong sa Tawong Lungsod	115,105	9.68
Enzo Villafuerte	Hugpong ng Pagbabago	105,139	8.84
Carmelo Clarion	Hugpong sa Tawong Lungsod	98,804	8.31
Melba Principe	Hugpong sa Tawong Lungsod	87,633	7.37
Total		1,188,804	100.00
Total votes		220,029	–
Registered voters/turnout		282,739	77.82
HNP hold majority			
Source: Commission on Elections
