= List of Cultural Properties of the Philippines in the Davao Region =

Kanchana property list in Philippine

This list contains an overview of the government recognized Cultural Properties of the Philippines in the Davao Region. The list is based on the official lists provided by the National Commission on Culture and the Arts, National Historical Commission of the Philippines and the National Museum of the Philippines.

Cultural Property wmph identifier (Note: wmph is an internal identifier used by Wikimedia Philippines to identify the monument. This is not an official identifier, and only shown temporarily in the templates until the government creates an updated complete list.)	Site name	Description	Province	City or municipality	Address	Coordinates	Image
PH-11-0001	Davao Penal Colony		Davao del Norte	Braulio E. Dujali		7°24′54″N 125°37′18″E	More images
PH-11-0002	Caraga Church		Davao Oriental	Caraga		7°19′40″N 126°33′57″E	Upload file
PH-11-0003	Port Sta. Ana		Davao del Sur	Davao City	Sta. Ana	7°04′36″N 125°37′36″E	Upload file

== See also ==
- List of historical markers of the Philippines in the Davao Region
