= 2016 Philippine presidential election in Zamboanga del Sur =

- May 9, 2016
- Registered: 563,155
- Turnout: 73.83% (Note: This percentage includes the province and Zamboanga City.)
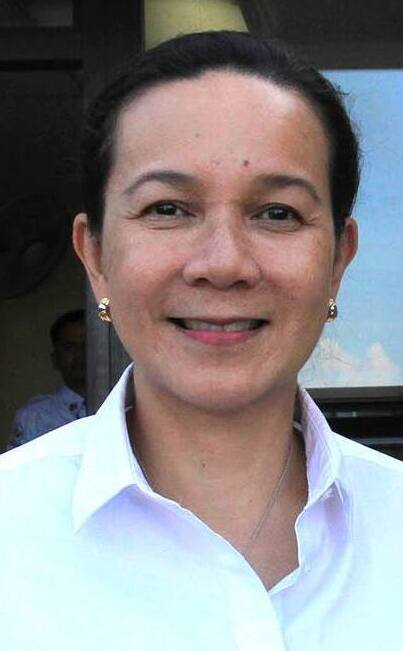

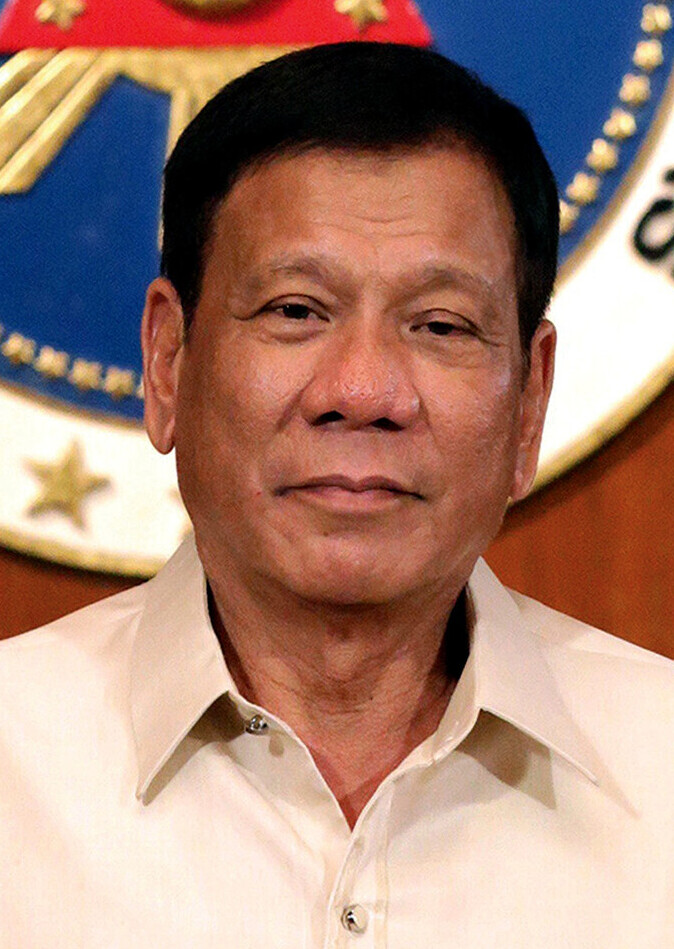

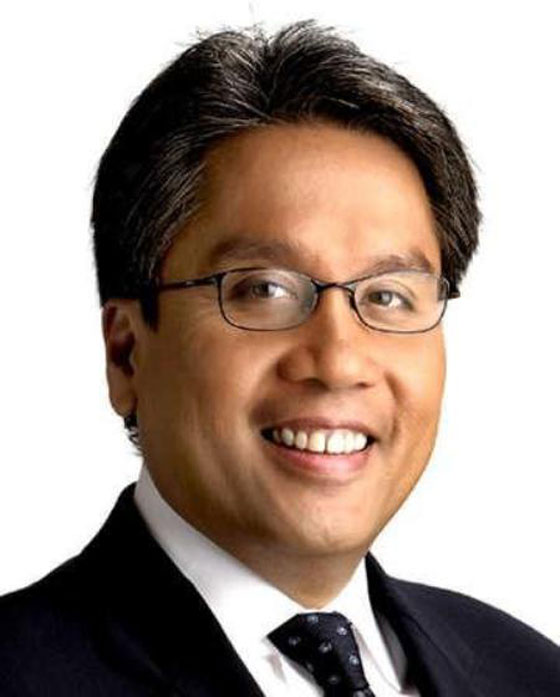
Candidate	Grace Poe	Rodrigo Duterte	Mar Roxas
Party	Independent	PDP–Laban	Liberal
Alliance	PGP		KDM
Running mate	Francis Escudero	Alan Peter Cayetano	Leni Robredo
popular vote	149,570	141,065	81,348
Percentage	37.85%	35.70%	20.59%
President before election
Benigno Aquino III
Liberal
Elected President
Rodrigo Duterte
PDP–Laban
- 2016 Philippine vice presidential election in Zamboanga del Sur
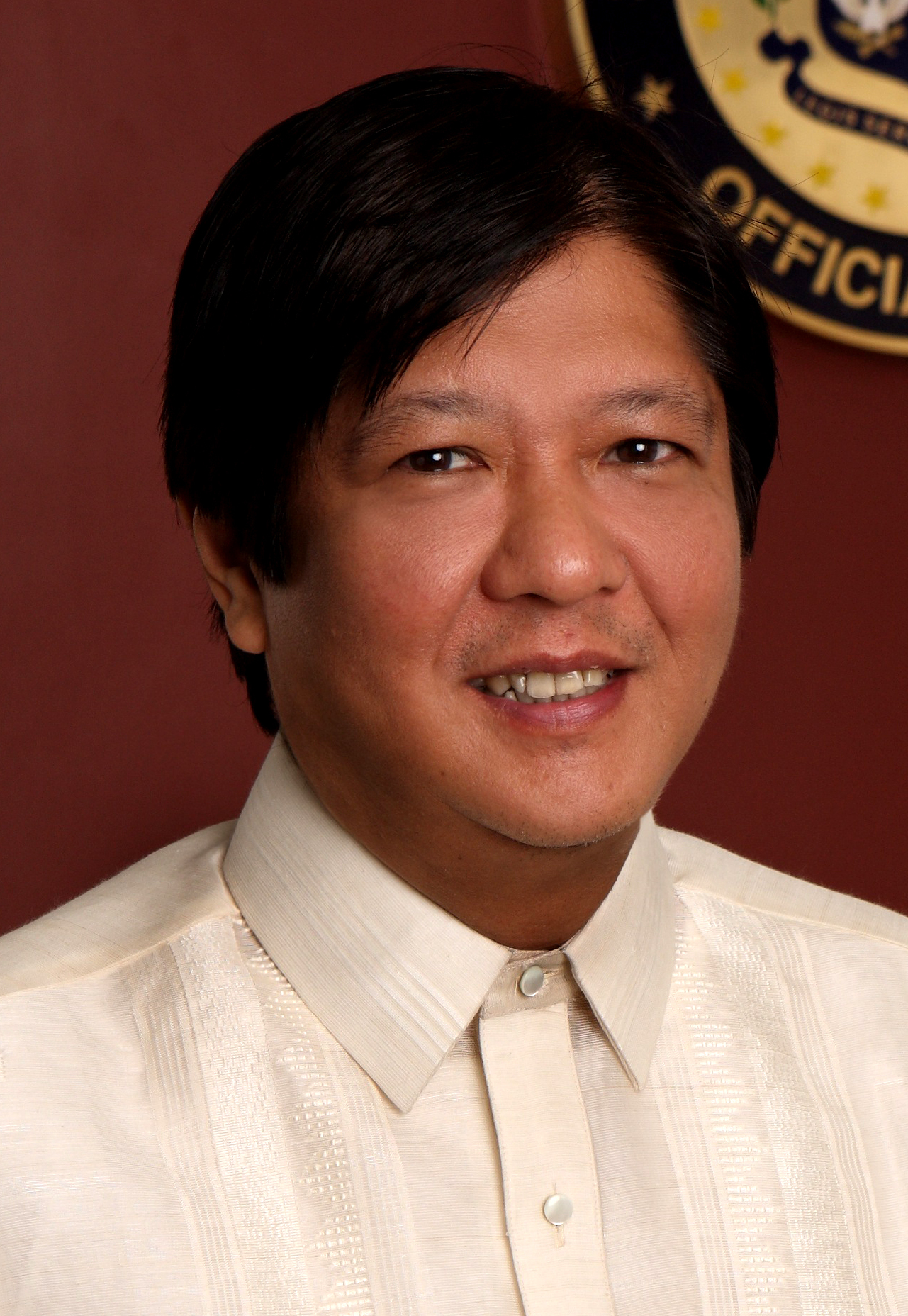

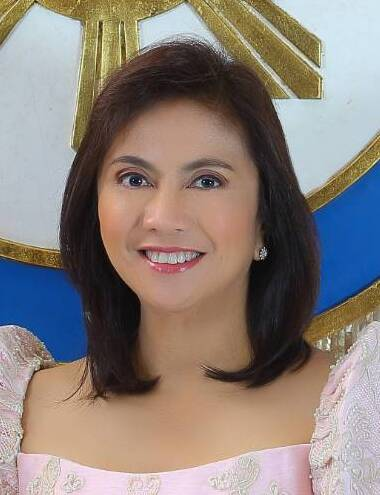

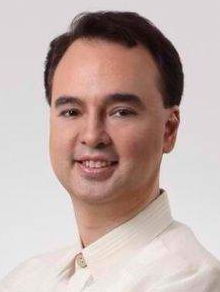
Candidate	Bongbong Marcos	Leni Robredo	Alan Peter Cayetano
Party	Independent	Liberal	Independent
Alliance		KDM
Popular vote	145,455	100,188	57,863
Percentage	41.25%	28.41%	16.41%
Vice President before election
Jejomar Binay
UNA
Elected Vice President
Leni Robredo
Liberal

The 2016 Philippine presidential and vice presidential elections in Zamboanga del Sur were held on Monday, May 9, 2016, as part of the 2016 Philippine general election in which all 81 provinces, all 145 cities, and all 1,489 municipalities participated. Voters voted the president and the vice president separately.

Senator Grace Poe narrowly won the province of Zamboanga del Sur defeating Davao City mayor Rodrigo Duterte, DILG Secretary Mar Roxas, Vice president Jejomar Binay, and fellow senator Miriam Defensor Santiago.

Senator Bongbong Marcos won in a landslide in the whole province and Zamboanga del Sur only against Camarines Sur's 3rd representative Leni Robredo and Senators Alan Peter Cayetano, Francis Escudero, Antonio Trillanes, and Gregorio Honasan.

This is the only province in Mindanao where Poe won. (If excluding Zamboanga City)

== Electoral system ==
According to the Constitution of the Philippines, the elections are held every six years after 1992, on the second Monday of May. The incumbent president is term limited and ineligible for re-election. The incumbent vice president is eligible to run for re-election and may run for two consecutive terms. The plurality voting system is used to determine the winner: the candidate with the highest number of votes, whether or not one has a majority, wins the presidency. The vice presidential election is a separate election, is held on the same rules, and voters may split their ticket. Both winners will serve six-year terms commencing on the noon of June 30, 2016, and ending on the same day six years later.

== Candidates ==
List of Presidential and Vice Presidential candidates on the ballot
Presidential candidate		Vice presidential candidate		Campaign
Candidate name and party	Position	Candidate name and party	Position	Campaign
Jejomar Binay UNA	Vice President	Gregorio Honasan UNA	Senator	(campaign)
Miriam Defensor Santiago PRP	Senator	Bongbong Marcos Independent (Note: Cayetano, Marcos and Trillanes are all members of the Nacionalista Party, but failed to get that party's nomination; instead, all of them ran as independents.)	Senator	(campaign)
Rodrigo Duterte PDP–Laban	Mayor of Davao City	Alan Peter Cayetano Independent	Senator	(campaign)
Grace Poe Independent	Senator	Francis Escudero Independent	Senator	(campaign)
Mar Roxas Liberal	Former secretary of the Interior and Local Government	Leni Robredo Liberal	House representative from Camarines Sur's 3rd district	(campaign)
None		Antonio Trillanes Independent	Senator	

== Results ==
=== Presidential result ===
2016 Philippine presidential election in Zamboanga del Sur (Note: The 381 votes for Roy Señeres are not listed here as they are deemed Invalid.)
Party	Candidate	Votes	%
Independent	Grace Poe	149,570	37.85%
PDP–Laban	Rodrigo Duterte	141,065	35.70%
Liberal	Mar Roxas	81,348	20.59%
UNA	Jejomar Binay	20,058	5.08%
PRP	Miriam Defensor Santiago	3,073	0.78%
Total votes		395,114	100.00%

=== Vice presidential result ===
2016 Philippine vice presidential election in Zamboanga del Sur
Party	Candidate	Votes	%
Independent	Bongbong Marcos	145,455	41.25%
Liberal	Leni Robredo	100,188	28.41%
Independent	Alan Peter Cayetano	57,863	16.41%
Independent	Francis Escudero	34,391	9.75%
Independent	Antonio Trillanes	8,110	2.30%
UNA	Gregorio Honasan	6,609	1.87%
Total votes		352,616	100.00%
