= 2016 Philippine presidential election in Zamboanga del Norte =

- May 9, 2016
- Registered: 605,146
- Turnout: 82.84%
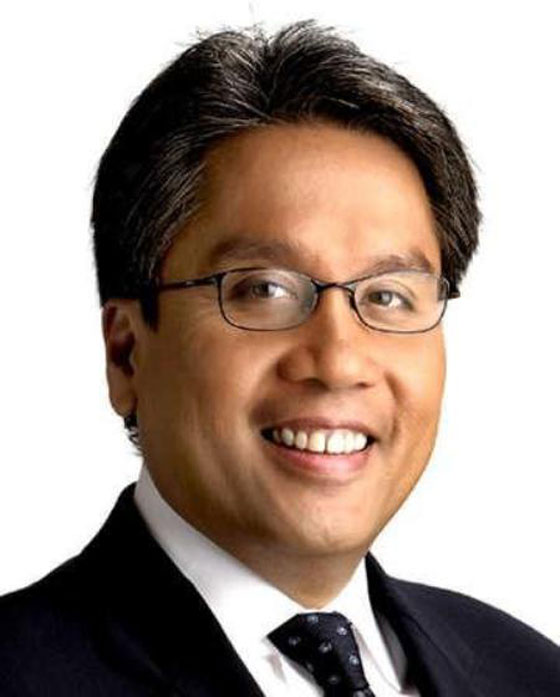

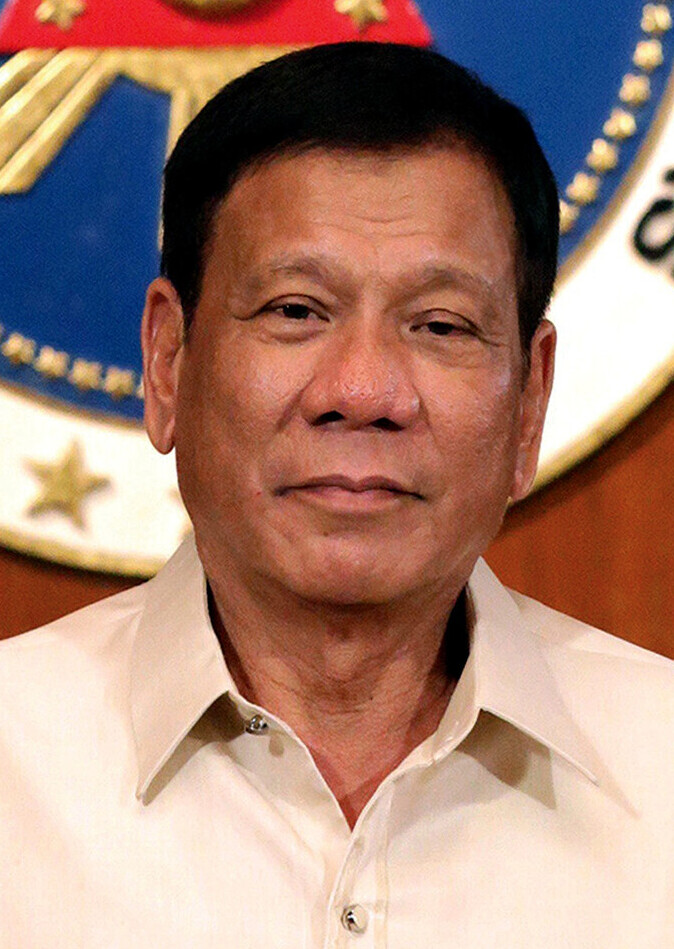

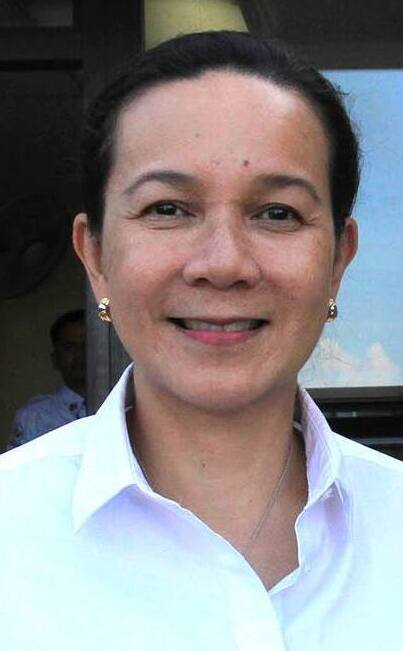
Candidate	Mar Roxas	Rodrigo Duterte	Grace Poe
Party	Liberal	PDP–Laban	Independent
Alliance	KDM		PGP
Running mate	Leni Robredo	Alan Peter Cayetano	Francis Escudero
popular vote	175,008	174,548	53,122
Percentage	39.24%	39.13%	11.91%
President before election
Benigno Aquino III
Liberal
Elected President
Rodrigo Duterte
PDP–Laban
- 2016 Philippine vice presidential election in Zamboanga del Norte
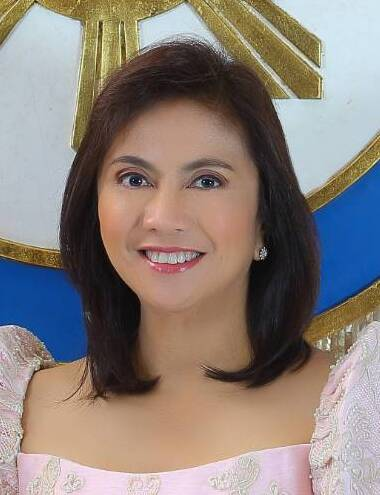

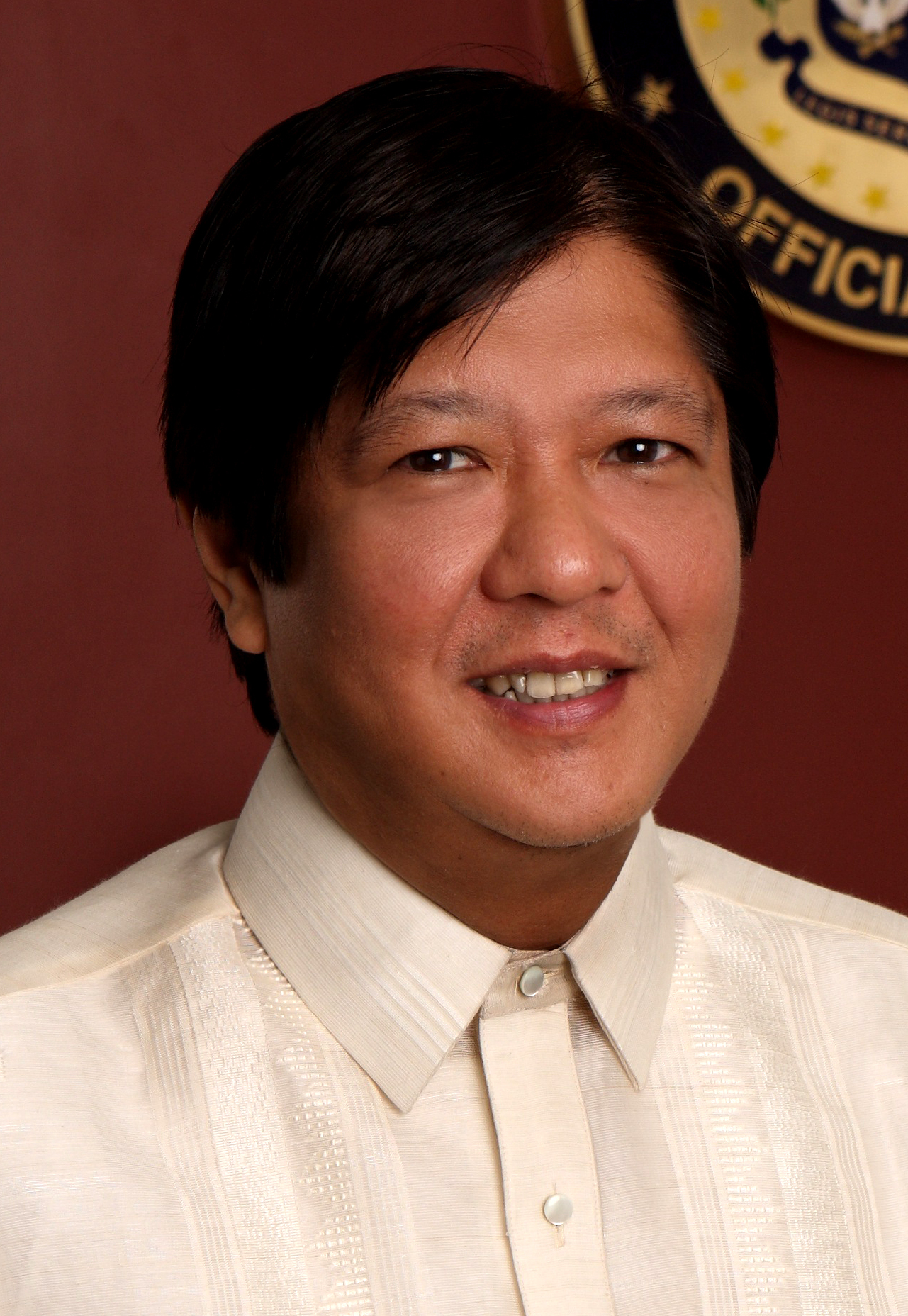

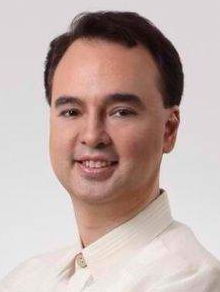

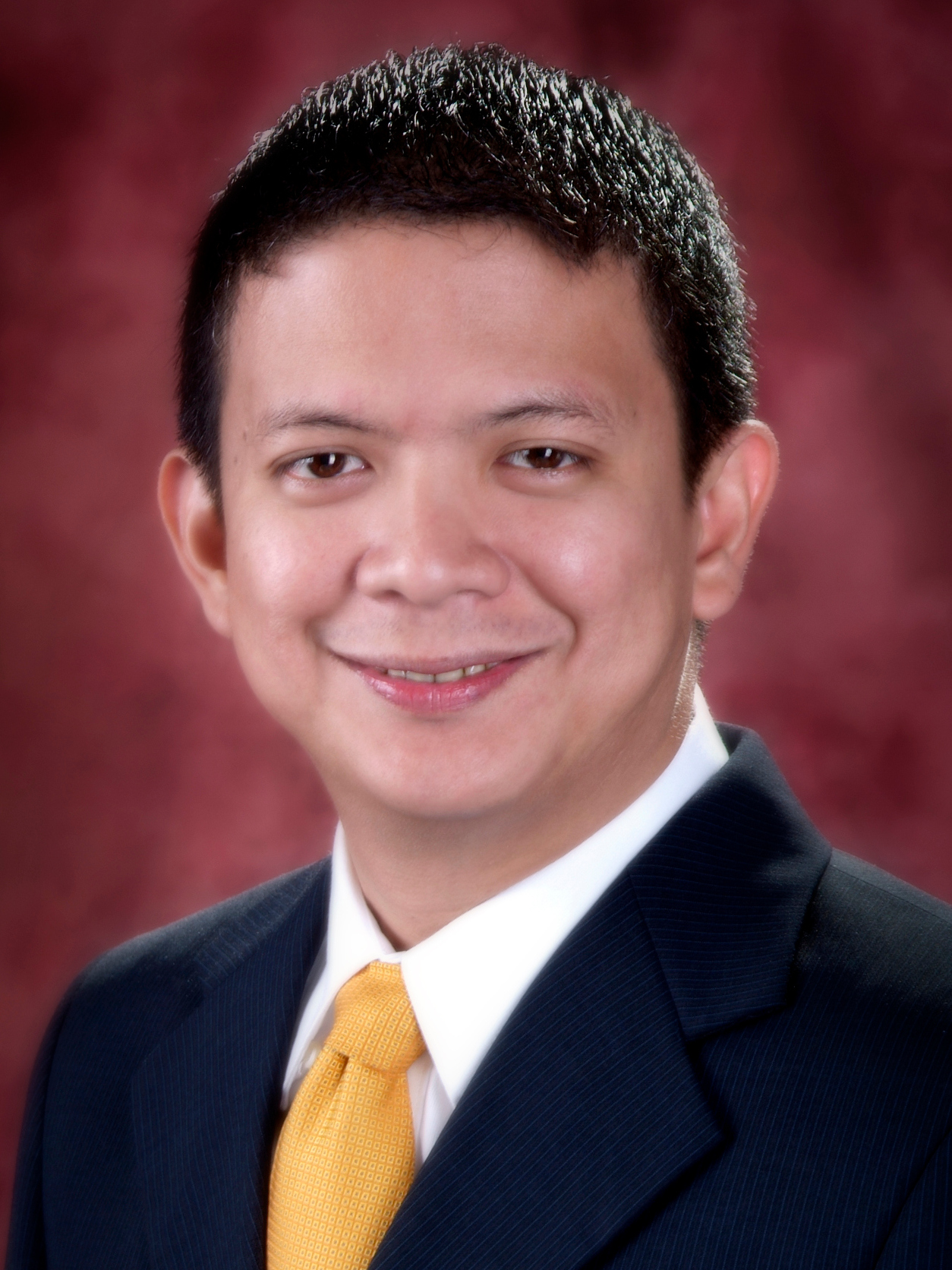
Candidate	Leni Robredo	Bongbong Marcos
Party	Liberal	Independent
Alliance	KDM
Popular vote	209,491	72,255
Percentage	51.08%	17.62%
Candidate	Alan Peter Cayetano	Francis Escudero
Party	Independent	Independent
Alliance		PGP
Popular vote	63,847	41,866
Percentage	15.57%	10.21%
Vice President before election
Jejomar Binay
UNA
Elected Vice President
Leni Robredo
Liberal

The 2016 Philippine presidential and vice presidential elections in Zamboanga del Norte were held on Monday, May 9, 2016, as part of the 2016 Philippine general election in which all 81 provinces, all 145 cities, and all 1,489 municipalities participated. Voters voted the president and the vice president separately.

DILG Secretary Mar Roxas narrowly defeated Davao City mayor Rodrigo Duterte in the province of Zamboanga del Norte with 0.11% ahead of Duterte. Roxas defeated Senator Grace Poe, Vice president Jejomar Binay, and Senator Miriam Defensor Santiago.

Camarines Sur representative Leni Robredo won the province in a landslide against Senators Bongbong Marcos, Alan Peter Cayetano. Francis Escudero, Gregorio Honasan, and Antonio Trillanes.

Zamboanga del Norte is one of the only three provinces of Mindanao where both Roxas and Robredo respectively won in their races.

== Electoral system ==
According to the Constitution of the Philippines, the elections are held every six years after 1992, on the second Monday of May. The incumbent president is term limited and ineligible for re-election. The incumbent vice president is eligible to run for re-election and may run for two consecutive terms. The plurality voting system is used to determine the winner: the candidate with the highest number of votes, whether or not one has a majority, wins the presidency. The vice presidential election is a separate election, is held on the same rules, and voters may split their ticket. Both winners will serve six-year terms commencing on the noon of June 30, 2016, and ending on the same day six years later.

== Candidates ==
List of Presidential and Vice Presidential candidates on the ballot
Presidential candidate		Vice presidential candidate		Campaign
Candidate name and party	Position	Candidate name and party	Position	Campaign
Jejomar Binay UNA	Vice President	Gregorio Honasan UNA	Senator	(campaign)
Miriam Defensor Santiago PRP	Senator	Bongbong Marcos Independent (Note: Cayetano, Marcos and Trillanes are all members of the Nacionalista Party, but failed to get that party's nomination; instead, all of them ran as independents.)	Senator	(campaign)
Rodrigo Duterte PDP–Laban	Mayor of Davao City	Alan Peter Cayetano Independent	Senator	(campaign)
Grace Poe Independent	Senator	Francis Escudero Independent	Senator	(campaign)
Mar Roxas Liberal	Former secretary of the Interior and Local Government	Leni Robredo Liberal	House representative from Camarines Sur's 3rd district	(campaign)
None		Antonio Trillanes Independent	Senator	

== Results ==
A total of 501,293 voters came out to vote out of the 605,146 registered voters in the province and the city.

=== Presidential result ===
2016 Philippine presidential election in Zamboanga del Norte (Note: The 394 votes for Roy Señeres are not listed here as they are deemed Invalid.)
Party	Candidate	Votes	%
Liberal	Mar Roxas	175,008	39.24%
PDP–Laban	Rodrigo Duterte	174,548	39.13%
Independent	Grace Poe	53,122	11.91%
UNA	Jejomar Binay	40,806	9.15%
PRP	Miriam Defensor Santiago	2,563	0.57%
Total votes		446,047	100.00%

=== Vice presidential result ===
2016 Philippine vice presidential election in Zamboanga del Norte
Party	Candidate	Votes	%
Liberal	Leni Robredo	209,491	51.08%
Independent	Bongbong Marcos	72,255	17.62%
Independent	Alan Peter Cayetano	63,847	15.57%
Independent	Francis Escudero	41,866	10.21%
UNA	Gregorio Honasan	14,500	3.54%
Independent	Antonio Trillanes	8,135	1.98
Total votes		410,094	100.00%
