= 1995 Davao City local elections =

Philippine election

1995 Davao City mayoral election
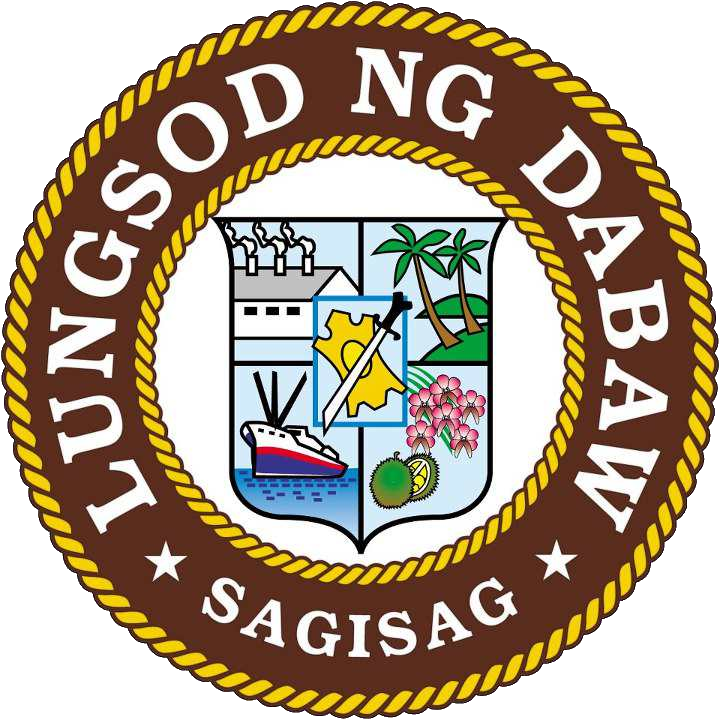
- May 8, 1995
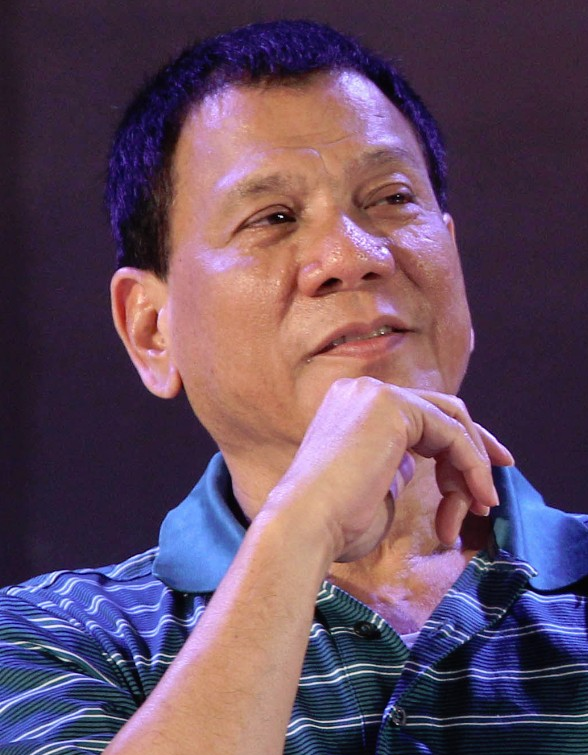
Candidate	Rodrigo Duterte
Party	Lakas
Running mate	Luis Bonguyan
Popular vote	300,161
Percentage	98.49%
Mayor before election
Rodrigo Duterte
Lakas
Elected mayor
Rodrigo Duterte
Lakas

Local elections were held in Davao City on May 8, 1995, as part of the 1995 Philippine general election. The voters elected for the elective local posts in the city: the mayor, vice mayor, three congressional representatives and 24 city councilors, eight in each of the city's three legislative districts.

== Results ==
=== Mayor ===
Incumbent mayor Rodrigo Duterte ran for a third term virtually unopposed, facing only one opponent, Magdaleno Marcellones, whom he derisively described as a "worthy opponent" during the campaign.

Candidate	Party	Votes	%
Rodrigo Duterte (incumbent)	Lakas–NUCD–UMDP	300,161	98.49
Magdaleno Marcellones	Independent	4,599	1.51
Total		304,760	100.00
Source: COMELEC

=== Vice mayor ===
For the vice mayoral race, incumbent vice mayor Luis Bonguyan of Lakas–NUCD–UMDP faced former city administrator Benjamin de Guzman of Nationalist People's Coalition. With Duterte's political group divided between Bonguyan and de Guzman—who were both closely identified with Duterte—de Guzman won the election over Bonguyan.

Candidate	Party	Votes	%
Benjamin de Guzman	Nationalist People's Coalition	165,893	54.77
Luis Bonguyan (incumbent)	Lakas–NUCD–UMDP	137,009	45.23
Total		302,902	100.00

=== Representatives ===
==== Davao City's 1st district ====
Prospero Nograles, an independent, won the election.

Candidate	Party	Votes	%
Prospero Nograles	Independent	63,400	
Total			
Source: Commission on Elections

==== Davao City's 2nd district ====
Incumbent Manuel Garcia of Lakas–NUCD–UMDP was re-elected to a second term.

Candidate	Party	Votes	%
Manuel Garcia (incumbent)	Lakas–NUCD–UMDP	39,025	
Total			
Source: Commission on Elections

==== Davao City's 3rd district ====
Incumbent Elias Lopez of the Nationalist People's Coalition was re-elected to a second term.

Candidate	Party	Votes	%
Elias Lopez (incumbent)	Nationalist People's Coalition	29,904	
Total			
Source: Commission on Elections
