= Philippine House Special Committee on Reforestation =

Special committee of the House of Representatives of the Philippines

Special Committee on Reforestation
- 20th Congress

History
- New session started: To convene on July 28, 2025

Leadership
- Chairman: Vacant
- Minority Leader: Vacant

Website
- Special Committee on Reforestation

The Philippine House Special Committee on Reforestation is a special committee of the Philippine House of Representatives.

== Jurisdiction ==
As prescribed by House Rules, the committee's jurisdiction is on the policies and programs on reforestation which includes the effects of forest denudation, and other actions to ensure the implementation of a sustained community-based nationwide reforestation program.

== Members, 20th Congress ==
As of June 30, 2025, all committee membership positions are vacant until the House convenes for its first regular session on July 28.

== Historical membership rosters ==
=== 18th Congress ===
Position	Members	Party	Province/City	District
Chairperson	Elias Bulut Jr.	NPC	Apayao	Lone
Vice Chairpersons	Solomon Chungalao	NPC	Ifugao	Lone
Vice Chairpersons	Maximo Dalog Jr.	Nacionalista	Mountain Province	Lone
Vice Chairpersons	Christian Unabia	Lakas	Misamis Oriental	1st
Vice Chairpersons	Cyrille Abueg-Zaldivar	PPP	Palawan	2nd
Members for the Majority	Abdulmunir Arbison	Nacionalista	Sulu	2nd
Members for the Majority	Ansaruddin Abdul Malik Adiong	Nacionalista	Lanao del Sur	1st
Members for the Majority	Faustino Michael Carlos Dy III	PFP	Isabela	5th
Members for the Majority	Tyrone Agabas	NPC	Pangasinan	6th
Members for the Majority	Alfonso Umali Jr.	Liberal	Oriental Mindoro	2nd
Members for the Majority	Paz Radaza	Lakas	Lapu-Lapu City	Lone
Members for the Majority	Ron Salo	KABAYAN	Party-list	
Members for the Minority	Alex Advincula	NUP	Cavite	3rd
Members for the Minority	Stella Luz Quimbo	Liberal	Marikina	2nd
Members for the Minority	Eufemia Cullamat	Bayan Muna	Party-list	

== See also ==
- House of Representatives of the Philippines
- List of Philippine House of Representatives committees
