= Philippine House Committee on Indigenous Cultural Communities and Indigenous Peoples =

Standing committee

Committee on Indigenous Cultural Communities and Indigenous Peoples
- 20th Congress

History
- New session started: To convene on July 28, 2025

Leadership
- Chairman: Vacant
- Minority Leader: Vacant

Website
- Committee on Indigenous Cultural Communities and Indigenous Peoples

The Philippine House Committee on Indigenous Cultural Communities and Indigenous Peoples, or House Indigenous Cultural Communities and Indigenous Peoples Committee is a standing committee of the Philippine House of Representatives.

== Jurisdiction ==
As prescribed by House Rules, the committee's jurisdiction includes the following:

- Indigenous cultural communities and indigenous peoples of the Philippines
- Development of indigenous communities

== Members, 20th Congress ==
As of June 30, 2025, all committee membership positions are vacant until the House convenes for its first regular session on July 28.

== Historical membership rosters ==
=== 18th Congress ===
Position	Members	Party	Province/City	District
Chairperson	Allen Jesse Mangaoang	Nacionalista	Kalinga	Lone
Vice Chairpersons	Amihilda Sangcopan	Anak Mindanao	Party-list	
Vice Chairpersons	Juan Fidel Felipe Nograles	Lakas	Rizal	2nd
Vice Chairpersons	Elias Bulut Jr.	NPC	Apayao	Lone
Vice Chairpersons	Maximo Dalog Jr.	Nacionalista	Mountain Province	Lone
Members for the Majority	Leonardo Babasa Jr.	PDP–Laban	Zamboanga del Sur	2nd
Members for the Majority	Junie Cua	PDP–Laban	Quirino	Lone
Members for the Majority	Carmelo Lazatin II	PDP–Laban	Pampanga	1st
Members for the Majority	Solomon Chungalao	NPC	Ifugao	Lone
Members for the Majority	Joseph Sto. Niño Bernos	Nacionalista	Abra	Lone
Members for the Majority	Mark Go	Nacionalista	Baguio	Lone
Members for the Majority	Luisa Lloren Cuaresma	NUP	Nueva Vizcaya	Lone
Members for the Majority	Raul Tupas	Nacionalista	Iloilo	5th
Members for the Majority	Noel Villanueva	NPC	Tarlac	3rd
Members for the Majority	Shirlyn Bañas-Nograles	PDP–Laban	South Cotabato	1st
Members for the Majority	Christian Unabia	Lakas	Misamis Oriental	1st
Members for the Minority	Eufemia Cullamat	Bayan Muna	Party-list	
Members for the Minority	Arlene Brosas	GABRIELA	Party-list	

==== Vice Chairperson ====
- Nestor Fongwan (Note: Died on December 18, 2019.) (Benguet–Lone, PDP–Laban)

== See also ==
- House of Representatives of the Philippines
- List of Philippine House of Representatives committees
- National Commission on Indigenous Peoples
- Indigenous Peoples' Rights Act of 1997
- Indigenous peoples of the Philippines
