= Davao City Hall =

- Davao City Hall in 2026
- Interactive map of the Davao City Hall area

General information
- Status: Completed
- Location: Davao City, Philippines
- Coordinates: 7°03′52″N 125°36′28″E
- Completed: 1926
- Renovated: 1947, 2017

Technical details
- Floor count: 2

The Davao City Hall is a government building which houses the office of the Mayor of Davao City.

== History ==
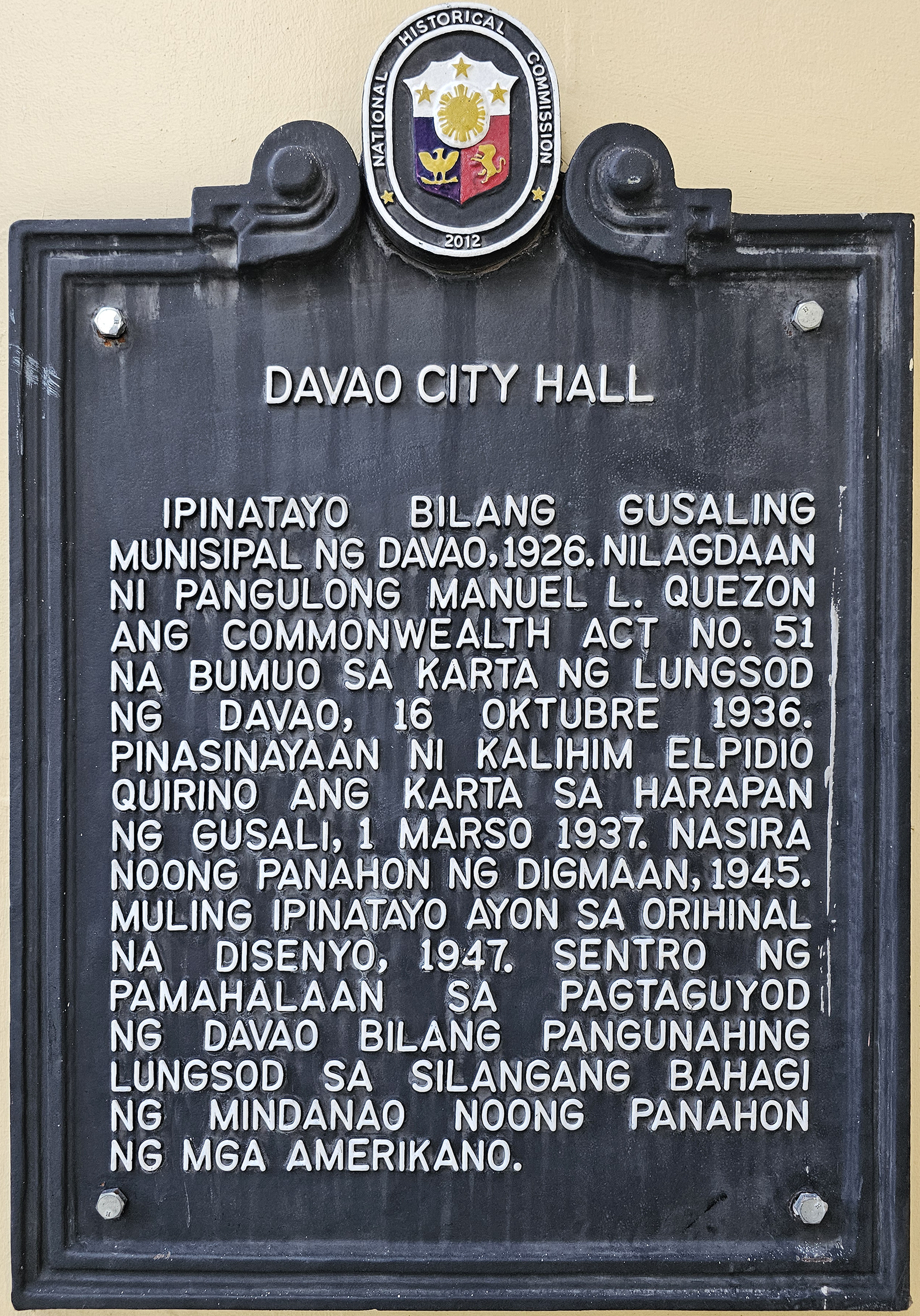
Davao City Hall historical marker

The Davao City Hall structure was built in 1926 when Davao City was still a municipality. The building's design was used as inspiration by Juan M. Arellano in designing the municipal hall of Concepcion, Tarlac, which was erected in 1929.

Davao formally attained cityhood through the Commonwealth Act No. 51 on October 16, 1936, during the presidency of Manuel L. Quezon. Davao's inauguration as a city was held on March 1, 1937.

The Davao City Hall was destroyed during World War II in 1945 and restored in 1947 based on its original design.

In 2017, the wooden flooring and door which is a legacy of the 1926 structure was renovated. The flooring was replaced by concrete and steel.

In celebration of the centennial year in 2026, the facade of the Davao City Hall was repainted back to its original white color. It was completed in February 2026 in time for the 89th Araw ng Dabaw, where it features projection mapping throughout the entire month of March. The opening of the said festival was held at the Davao City Hall, but was forced to relocate to the nearby Rizal Park for the rest of the show due to a sudden rain.

Currently, restoration are still underway through repairing windows and installing lights to illuminate the full facade at night.

== Heritage status ==
The National Historical Commission of the Philippines recognizes the building as a historical site on November 17, 2012.

== Gallery ==
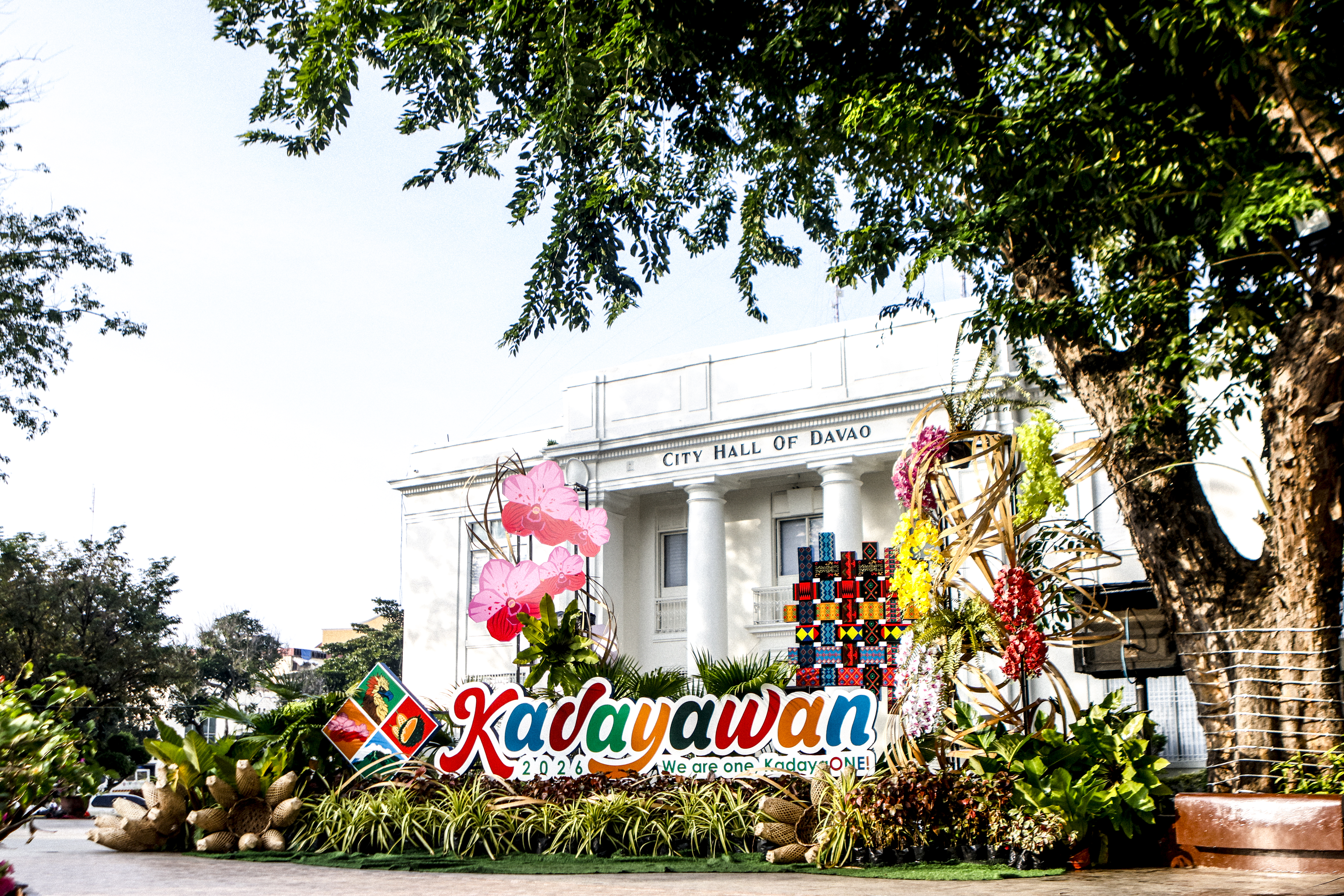

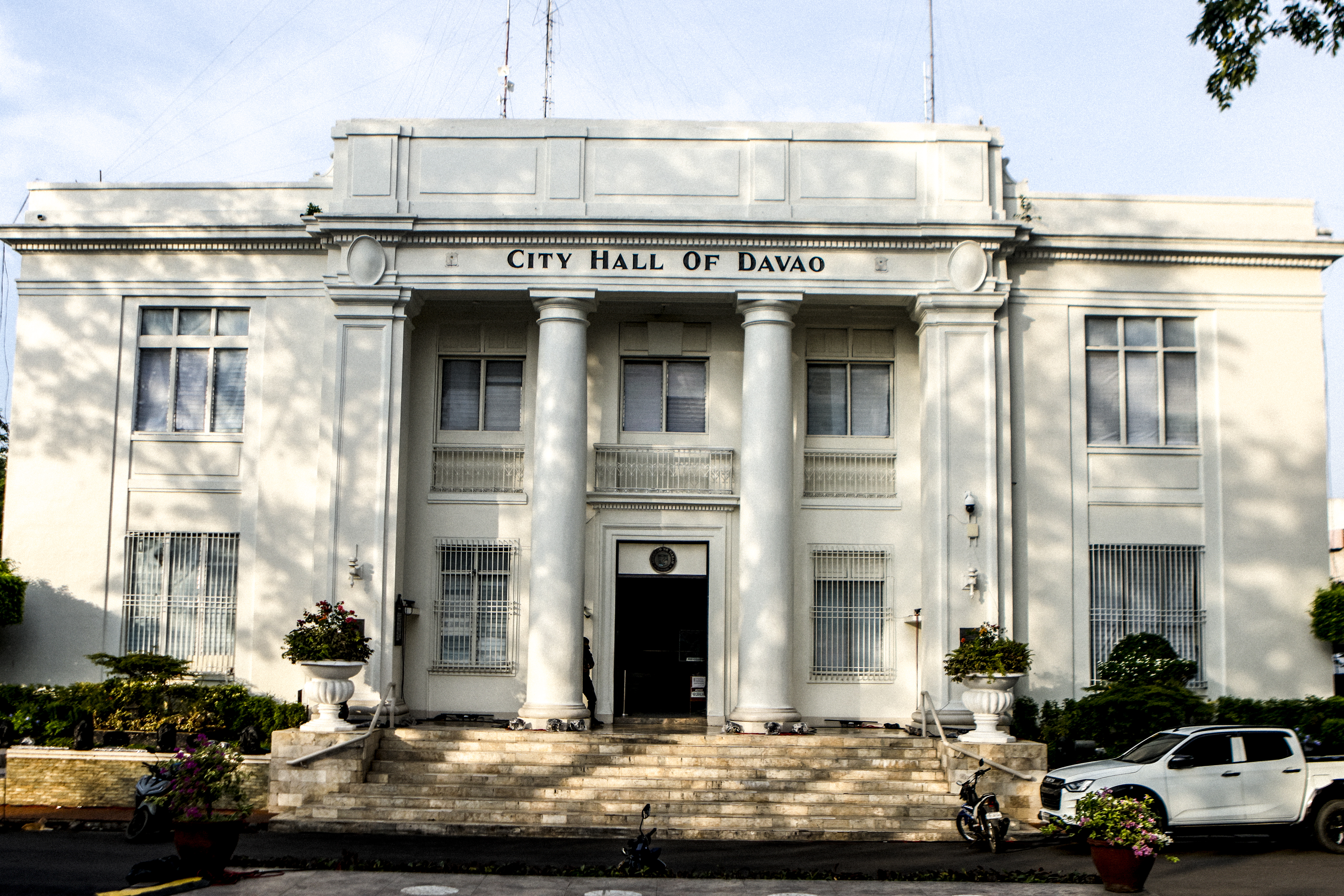
