= Davao City's 2nd congressional district =

Legislative district of the Philippines

- Constituency for the House of Representatives of the Philippines
- Map
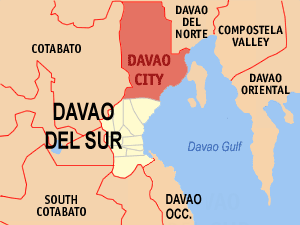
- Location of Davao City within the Davao Region
- City: Davao City
- Region: Davao Region
- Population: 592,250 (2015)
- Electorate: 354,747 (2022)
- Major settlements: 46 barangays: Barangays; Acacia; Agdao Proper; Alejandra Navarro (Lasang); Alfonso Angliongto Sr.; Buhangin Proper; Bunawan Proper; Cabantian; Callawa; Centro (San Juan); Colosas; Communal; Gatungan; Fatima (Benowang); Gov. Paciano Bangoy; Gov. Vicente Duterte; Ilang; Indangan; Kap. Tomas Monteverde, Sr.; Lapu-Lapu; Leon Garcia; Lumiad; Mabuhay; Mahayag; Malabog; Mandug; Mapula; Mudiang; Pampanga; Panacan; Panalum; Pandaitan; Paquibato Proper; Paradise Embak; Rafael Castillo; Salapawan; San Antonio; San Isidro (Licanan); Sasa; Sumimao; Tapak; Tibungco; Tigatto; Ubalde; Vicente Hizon Sr.; Waan; Wilfredo Aquino
- Area: 830.37 km^{2} (320.61 sq mi)

Current constituency
- Created: 1987
- Representative: Omar Duterte
- Political party: HTL
- Congressional bloc: Independent

Davao City's 2nd congressional district is one of the three congressional districts of the Philippines in Davao City. It has been represented in the House of Representatives since 1987. The district covers four city districts located to the north and northeast of the city's poblacion or downtown commercial area, namely Agdao, Buhangin, Bunawan and Paquibato. It is currently represented in the 20th Congress by Omar Duterte of the Hugpong sa Tawong Lungsod (HTL).

== Representation history ==
| # | Image | Member | Term of office | | Congress | Party | Electoral history | Constituent LGUs |
| # | Image | Member | Start | End | Congress | Party | Electoral history | Constituent LGUs |
|---|---|---|---|---|---|---|---|---|
=== Davao City's 2nd district for the House of Representatives of the Philippines ===
District created February 2, 1987 from Davao City's at-large district.
| 1 | | Cornelio P. Maskariño | June 30, 1987 | June 30, 1992 | 8th | LnB | Elected in 1987. | 1987–present Agdao, Buhangin, Bunawan, Paquibato |
| 1 | | Cornelio P. Maskariño | June 30, 1987 | June 30, 1992 | 8th | Liberal | Elected in 1987. | 1987–present Agdao, Buhangin, Bunawan, Paquibato |
| 2 | | Manuel M. Garcia | June 30, 1992 | June 30, 2001 | 9th | NPC | Elected in 1992. | 1987–present Agdao, Buhangin, Bunawan, Paquibato |
| 2 | | Manuel M. Garcia | June 30, 1992 | June 30, 2001 | 10th | Lakas | Re-elected in 1995. | 1987–present Agdao, Buhangin, Bunawan, Paquibato |
| 2 | | Manuel M. Garcia | June 30, 1992 | June 30, 2001 | 11th | Lakas | Re-elected in 1998. | 1987–present Agdao, Buhangin, Bunawan, Paquibato |
| 3 | | Vincent Garcia | June 30, 2001 | June 30, 2010 | 12th | NPC | Elected in 2001. | 1987–present Agdao, Buhangin, Bunawan, Paquibato |
| 3 | | Vincent Garcia | June 30, 2001 | June 30, 2010 | 13th | NPC | Re-elected in 2004. | 1987–present Agdao, Buhangin, Bunawan, Paquibato |
| 3 | | Vincent Garcia | June 30, 2001 | June 30, 2010 | 14th | NPC | Re-elected in 2007. | 1987–present Agdao, Buhangin, Bunawan, Paquibato |
| 4 | | Mylene Garcia-Albano | June 30, 2010 | June 30, 2019 | 15th | Liberal | Elected in 2010. | 1987–present Agdao, Buhangin, Bunawan, Paquibato |
| 4 | | Mylene Garcia-Albano | June 30, 2010 | June 30, 2019 | 16th | Liberal | Re-elected in 2013. | 1987–present Agdao, Buhangin, Bunawan, Paquibato |
| 4 | | Mylene Garcia-Albano | June 30, 2010 | June 30, 2019 | 17th | PDP–Laban | Re-elected in 2016. | 1987–present Agdao, Buhangin, Bunawan, Paquibato |
| (3) | | Vincent Garcia | June 30, 2019 | June 30, 2025 | 18th | HNP | Elected in 2019. | 1987–present Agdao, Buhangin, Bunawan, Paquibato |
| (3) | | Vincent Garcia | June 30, 2019 | June 30, 2025 | 19th | Lakas | Re-elected in 2022. | 1987–present Agdao, Buhangin, Bunawan, Paquibato |
| 5 | | Omar Duterte | June 30, 2025 | Incumbent | 20th | HTL | Elected in 2025. | 1987–present Agdao, Buhangin, Bunawan, Paquibato |

== Election results ==
=== 2025 ===
2025 Philippine House of Representatives elections
| Party | Candidate | Votes | % |
|---|---|---|---|
| Hugpong | Omar Duterte | 160,432 | |
| PFP | Javi Garcia Campos | 90,156 | |
| Independent | Melogen Montesclaros | 1,895 | |
| Total votes | | | |

=== 2022 ===
2022 Philippine House of Representatives elections
| Party | Candidate | Votes | % |
|---|---|---|---|
| Hugpong | Vincent Garcia | 153,902 | |
| Hugpong | Danny Dayanghirang | 71,074 | |
| Independent | Alberto Dulong | 2,329 | |
| Total votes | | | 100.00 |
| Hugpong hold | | | |

=== 2019 ===
2019 Philippine House of Representatives elections
| Party | Candidate | Votes | % |
|---|---|---|---|
| Hugpong | Vincent Garcia | 174,389 | 100.00 |
| Total votes | | 174,389 | 100.00 |
| Hugpong gain from PDP–Laban | | | |

=== 1987 ===
1987 Philippine House of Representatives elections
| Party | Candidate | Votes | % |
|---|---|---|---|
| Liberal | Cornelio Maskariño | 43,938 | 50.59 |
| Nacionalista | Manuel Garcia | 32,104 | 36.97 |
| Partido ng Bayan | Proculo Fuentes | 4,623 | 5.32 |
| Independent | Liborio Lumain | 3,064 | 3.53 |
| Independent | Diosdado Mahipus | 3,005 | 3.46 |
| Independent | Ed Palomares | 113 | 0.13 |
| Total votes | | 86,847 | 100.00 |

== See also ==
- Legislative districts of Davao City
