= Mayor of Davao City =

Local chief executive of Davao City, Philippines

- Tagalog: Punong Lungsod ng Davao; Cebuano: Punong Dakbayan sa Davao
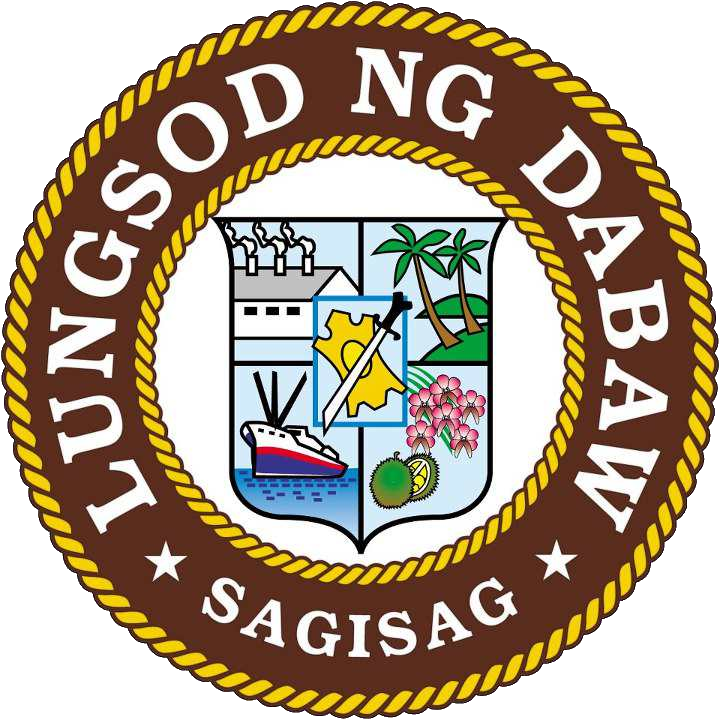
- Seal of Davao City

- Incumbent; Sebastian Duterte since June 30, 2022
- Local Government of Davao City
- Style: The Honorable
- Residence: Davao City Hall
- Appointer: Direct popular vote or by succession from the vice mayoralty
- Term length: Three years, renewable twice consecutively
- Inaugural holder: Santiago Artiaga
- Formation: December 3, 1936; 89 years ago
- Website: https://www.davaocity.gov.ph/

The mayor of Davao City (Cebuano: Punong Dakbayan sa Davao) is the chief executive of the government of Davao City in Davao Region, Philippines. The mayor leads the city's departments in executing ordinances and delivering public services. The mayorship is a three-year term and each mayor is restricted to three consecutive terms, totalling nine years, although a mayor can be elected again after an interruption of one term.

The incumbent mayor is Sebastian Duterte, son of the 16th and former Philippine Republic President Rodrigo Duterte.

== History ==
On March 16, 1936, Davao Assemblyman Romualdo C. Quimpo filed a bill seeking to create the chartered City of Davao. This bill would later be signed by President Manuel L. Quezon as Commonwealth Act No. 51 on October 16, 1936. Davao City shall then be governed by a Mayor as an independent City.

In 1967, the province of Davao was divided into three provinces: Davao del Norte, Davao Oriental and Davao del Sur. Geographically, Davao City became part of Davao del Sur, but was no longer its provincial capital. It became the commercial center of Southern Mindanao. This period also saw the election of an indigenous person to the city mayorship when Elias Baguio Lopez, a full-blooded Bagobo, won the 1967 local elections.

In 1972, Davao City became the regional administrative capital of Southern Mindanao. Thereafter, upon its reorganization as the regional capital of the Davao Region (Region XI), it was the sole highly urbanized city in the Davao Region.

In 1986, President Corazon Aquino appointed Rodrigo Duterte as OIC Vice Mayor. Duterte later ran for Mayor and won, taking the top post from 1988 to 1998, from 2001 to 2010, and yet again from 2013 to 2016. The incumbent city mayor is his youngest child, Sebastian Duterte.

== Notable mayors ==
=== Santiago Artiaga ===
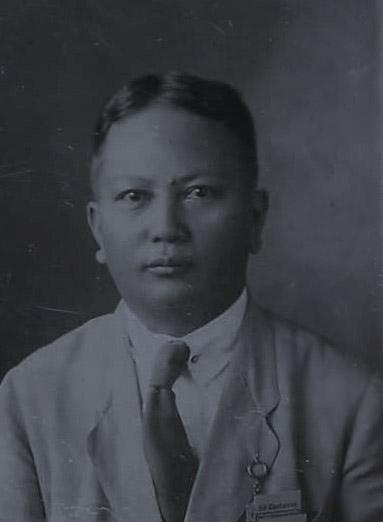
Santiago Artiaga

Before claiming the honor as Davao City’s first sitting mayor, Santiago Artiaga (1878–1962), one of the first pensionados (state scholars) during the American occupation, was already a colorful, if controversial, figure in Manila. As the city engineer, the highest position next to the mayor, he had clashes with the city council and, as acting city mayor, was the envy of his detractors.

In 1933, he filed an early retirement from public service, but this was not accepted. He continued to serve as city engineer until 1936 when he resigned to accept the appointment as de jure mayor of Zamboanga City. Two weeks thereafter, he was reassigned to Davao as its first city mayor.

For nearly three years Artiaga served diligently as local chief executive, but had to leave after President Manuel L. Quezon plucked him out for another assignment. On October 13, 1939, Malacañang announced his appointment as the new provincial governor of Bukidnon, replacing Agustin Alvarez who took over as the new city mayor of Davao.

=== Rodrigo Duterte ===
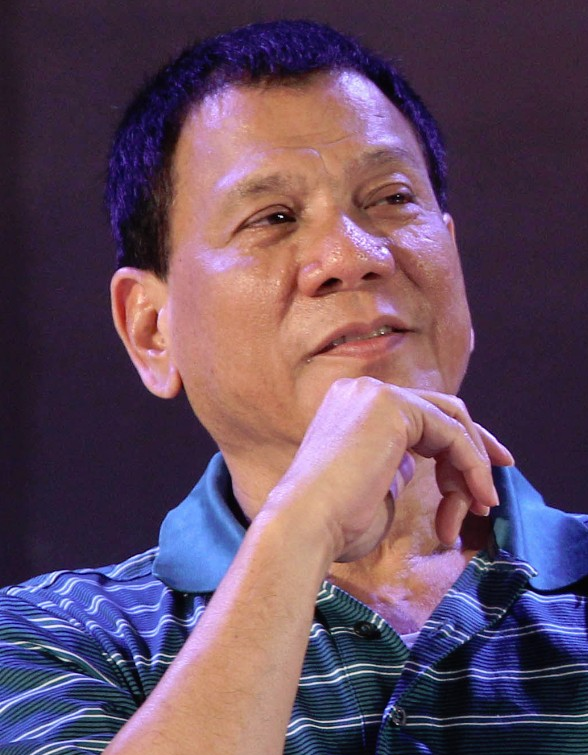
Rodrigo Duterte

Rodrigo Duterte, a lawyer and former city prosecutor, served seven terms as mayor of Davao City. In 2016, he was elected as the 16th president of the Philippines.

Duterte was born on March 28, 1945, in Maasin, Southern Leyte. His father, Vicente Duterte, served as mayor of Danao, Cebu and governor of Davao, and his mother, Soledad Roa-Duterte, was a public school teacher and a noted community activist.

Duterte's rise from the legal ranks to politics began when he was named special counsel at the City Prosecution Office in Davao City in 1977. He became assistant city prosecutor two years later, serving until 1986.

In May 1986, he was appointed OIC vice mayor of Davao City by the revolutionary government of Corazon Aquino. He won as mayor of Davao City in the 1988 local elections under the Lakas ng Dabaw banner, defeating former OIC mayor Zafiro Respicio and popular broadcaster Jun Pala.

Nicknamed "The Punisher" by Time Magazine for his controversial methods, Duterte nevertheless was successful in reducing crime. Furthermore, he was credited with helping to make Davao City cleaner by enforcing a smoking ban, and for his LGBT-friendly measures. His popularity was such that he served seven terms as mayor, sidestepping term limits with stints as a congressman and vice mayor, and drew huge ratings with a weekly television program "Gikan sa Masa, Para sa Masa."

=== Sara Duterte ===
Sara Duterte

Sara Duterte served as mayor of Davao City twice — during the first half of presidency of Benigno Aquino III and during the entire presidency of her father. She became the city's first female mayor, and the youngest to ever be elected in its history.

Duterte entered the vice presidential race at the last hour via substitution after initially claiming that she had no interest in seeking a national post. Duterte won as Vice President of the Philippines in the 2022 Philippine presidential election, as part of the UniTeam alliance with former senator Bongbong Marcos, the son of the late President Ferdinand Marcos, as her running-mate for the presidency.

In 2024, Duterte resigned as secretary of education and also the vice chairperson of the National Task Force to End Local Communist Armed Conflict (NTF-ELCAC), an anti-insurgency task force. Political analysts have observed that, despite her initial election alliance with Marcos, a developing breach between the Marcos and Duterte political families is correlated with her rising absence from public appearances with the president.

== List of mayors ==
No.	Mayor	Party	Tenure		Vice mayor
Commonwealth
1	Santiago Artiaga	Independent	December 3, 1936	October 11, 1939	
2	Agustin L. Alvarez	Independent	October 12, 1939	October 11, 1940	
3	Pantaleon A. Pelayo	Independent	October 12, 1940	December 8, 1941	
Second Republic (Japanese Occupation)
4	Alfonso G. Oboza	KALIBAPI	February 1, 1942	May 10, 1943	
5	Juan A. Sarenas	KALIBAPI	May 11, 1943	1944	
6	Donato C. Endriga	KALIBAPI	1944	May 4, 1945	
Commonwealth
(3)	Pantaleon A. Pelayo	Independent	May 5, 1945	January 1, 1946	
7	Apolinario C. Cabigon	Nacionalista	2 January 1946	17 February 1946	
8	Fundador R. Villafuerte	Nacionalista	February 18, 1946	July 28, 1946	
Third Republic
9	Leon Maria A. Garcia	Nacionalista	July 29, 1946	January 14, 1949	
10	Bernardo B. Teves	Nacionalista	January 15, 1949	May 26, 1952	
11	Rodolfo B. Sarenas	Nacionalista	May 27, 1952	May 28, 1954	
12	Julian A. Rodriguez	Nacionalista	May 29, 1954	December 31, 1955	
13	Carmelo L. Porras	Liberal	January 1, 1956	December 31, 1959	Ramon G. Morada
13	Carmelo L. Porras	Liberal	January 1, 1960	December 31, 1963	Fermin T. Abella
13	Carmelo L. Porras	Liberal	January 1, 1964	December 31, 1967	Elias B. Lopez
14	Elias B. Lopez	Nacionalista	January 1, 1968	December 31, 1971	Manuel C. Sotto
Martial Law
15	Luis T. Santos	Nacionalista	January 1, 1972	1975	Cornelio P. Maskariño
15	Luis T. Santos	Nacionalista	1976	March 16, 1981	Cornelio P. Maskariño
Fourth Republic
(14)	Elias B. Lopez	Kilusang Bagong Lipunan	April 1981	April 2, 1986	Cornelio P. Maskariño
Transitional Government
16	Zafiro Respicio	PDP–Laban	April 4, 1986	May 2, 1986	Cornelio P. Maskariño
16	Zafiro Respicio	PDP–Laban	May 2, 1986	November 27, 1987	Rodrigo Duterte
Fifth Republic
17	Jacinto Rubillar Jr.	Lakas ng Bansa	December 17, 1987	January 14, 1988	Gilbert Abellera
17	Jacinto Rubillar Jr.	Lakas ng Bansa	January 14, 1988	February 2, 1988	Thelmo Dumadag
18	Rodrigo Duterte	Independent	February 2, 1988	November 12, 1990	Dominador Zuño Jr.
19	Dominador Zuño Jr. (Acting)	PDP–Laban	November 12, 1990	January 11, 1991	Corazon Nuñez Malanyaon
(18)	Rodrigo Duterte	Nacionalista	January 11, 1991	June 30, 1992	Dominador B. Zuño Jr.
(18)	Rodrigo Duterte	NPC	June 30, 1992	June 30, 1995	Luis C. Bonguyan
(18)	Rodrigo Duterte	Lakas–NUCD	June 30, 1995	March 19, 1998	Benjamin de Guzman
20	Benjamin de Guzman (Acting)	Alyansa sa Katawhan sa Dabaw	March 19, 1998	June 30, 1998	Danilo Dayanghirang (March 19 – 27, 1998)
20	Benjamin de Guzman (Acting)	Alyansa sa Katawhan sa Dabaw	March 19, 1998	June 30, 1998	Pilar Braga (March 27, 1998 – June 30, 1998)
(20)	Benjamin de Guzman	LAMMP	June 30, 1998	June 30, 2001	Luis C. Bonguyan
(18)	Rodrigo Duterte	PDP–Laban	June 30, 2001	June 30, 2004	Luis C. Bonguyan
(18)	Rodrigo Duterte	PDP–Laban	June 30, 2004	June 30, 2007	Luis C. Bonguyan
(18)	Rodrigo Duterte	Liberal	June 30, 2007	June 30, 2010	Sara Duterte
21	Sara Duterte	Hugpong sa Tawong Lungsod	June 30, 2010	June 30, 2013	Rodrigo Duterte
(18)	Rodrigo Duterte	Hugpong sa Tawong Lungsod	June 30, 2013	June 30, 2016	Paolo Duterte
(21)	Sara Duterte	Hugpong sa Tawong Lungsod	June 30, 2016	January 5, 2018	Paolo Duterte
(21)	Sara Duterte	Hugpong ng Pagbabago	January 5, 2018	June 30, 2019	Bernard Al-ag
(21)	Sara Duterte	Hugpong ng Pagbabago	June 30, 2019	June 30, 2022	Sebastian Duterte
22	Sebastian Duterte	Hugpong ng Pagbabago	June 30, 2022	June 30, 2025	Jesus Melchor Quitain Jr.
(18)	Rodrigo Duterte	Hugpong sa Tawong Lungsod	– (Note: Elected in 2025 but did not assume office due to inability to take oath of office within the six-month prescribed period while under detention in The Hague.)	–	Sebastian Duterte
(22)	Sebastian Duterte	Hugpong sa Tawong Lungsod	June 30, 2025 (Note: In acting capacity until January 23, 2026.)	Present	Rodrigo "Rigo" Duterte II

== Vice Mayor of Davao City ==
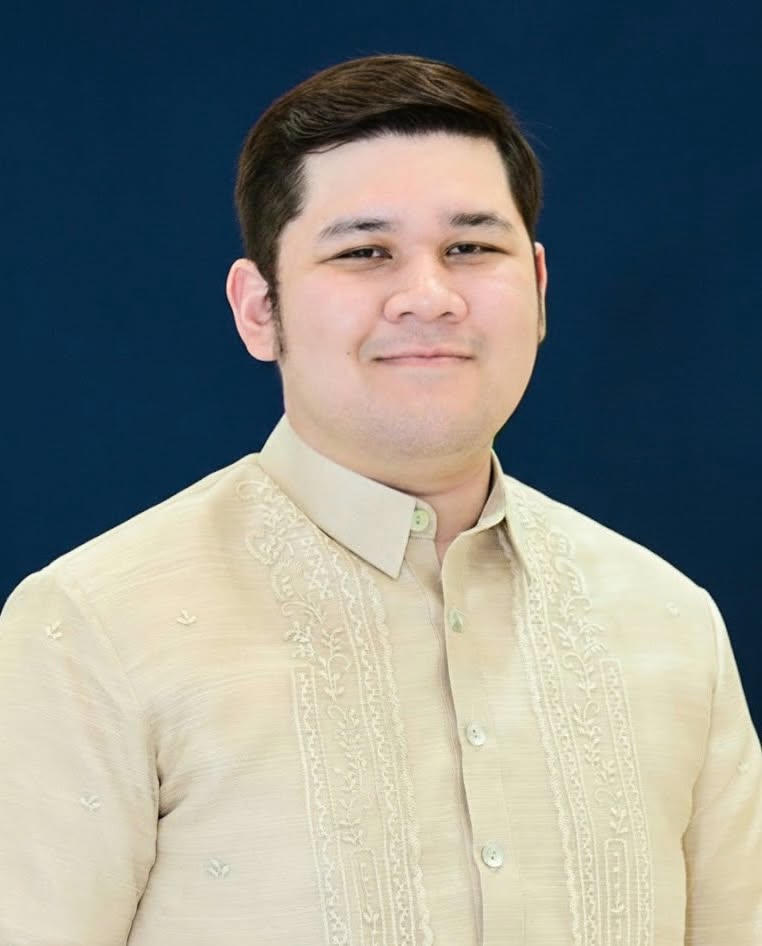
Vice Mayor Rigo Duterte (2025–present)

The vice mayor is the second-highest official of Davao City. The vice mayor is elected via popular vote; although most mayoral candidates have running mates, the vice mayor is elected separately from the mayor. This can result in the mayor and the vice mayor coming from different political parties.

The vice mayor is the presiding officer of the Davao City Council, although he can only vote as the tiebreaker. When a mayor is removed from office or is unable to assume the position due to temporary incapacity (whether physical or legal), suspension, or an official leave of absence, the vice mayor serves as acting mayor until the elected mayor can return or until the next election. In the event the vice mayor's office is vacated, the highest-voted member of the Davao City Council, based on the preceding election results, assumes the post.

The post has been held by Rodrigo "Rigo" Duterte II since June 30, 2025, initially in an acting capacity. He was formally elevated to the position on January 23, 2026.

== Elections ==
- 1988 Davao City local elections
- 1992 Davao City local elections
- 1995 Davao City local elections
- 1998 Davao City local elections
- 2001 Davao City local elections
- 2004 Davao City local elections
- 2007 Davao City local elections
- 2010 Davao City local elections
- 2013 Davao City local elections
- 2016 Davao City local elections
- 2019 Davao City local elections
- 2022 Davao City local elections
- 2025 Davao City local elections
