= San Salvador del Mundo Church (Caraga) =

Roman Catholic church in Davao Oriental, Philippines

Caraga Church
- San Salvador del Mundo Parish Church
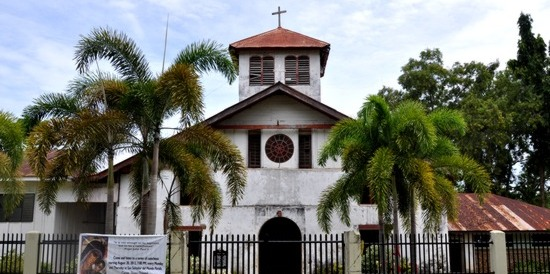
- Church facade in 2012

- Location in Mindanao Location in the Philippines
- 7°19′40″N 126°33′57″E
- Location: Caraga, Davao Oriental
- Country: Philippines
- Denomination: Roman Catholic

History
- Status: Parish church
- Dedication: San Salvador del Mundo (Christ, Holy Saviour of the World)

Architecture
- Functional status: Active
- Heritage designation: Important Cultural Property (National Museum)
- Architectural type: Church building
- Completed: 1884

Administration
- Province: Davao
- Archdiocese: Davao
- Diocese: Mati

Clergy
- Archbishop: Romulo Valles
- Bishop: Patricio Hacbang Alo

San Salvador del Mundo Parish Church, commonly known as Caraga Church, is the Roman Catholic parish church of Caraga, Davao Oriental in the Philippines. It is under the jurisdiction of the Diocese of Mati. The town of Caraga was established in 1861, making it one of the oldest towns in the province of Davao Oriental. When the Jesuits took charge of the spiritual administration of the town in 1871 from the Augustinian Recollects, a stone and wooden church was built in 1877 to serve as mission station of Spanish Missionaries in propagating Christianity in the eastern side of Mindanao. When it was completed in 1884, the church was dedicated to San Salvador del Mundo (Christ, Holy Saviour of the World).

== Location ==
San Salvador del Mundo Church is built on promontory facing the Pacific Ocean situated in Caraga's Poblacion.

== Features ==
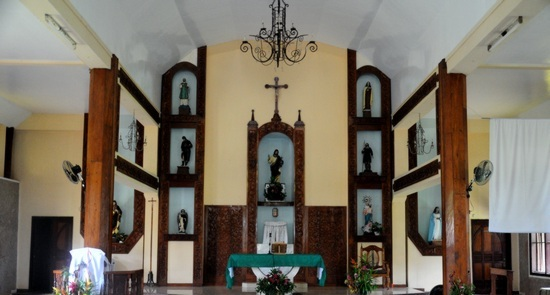
Church altar in 2012

The San Salvador del Mundo Church is designed as a fortress church mainly made of limestone blocks, corals and wood. The church's main door has inscription that bears a symbol of Christ which dates the structure's foundation in 1884. The interior has undergone much renovation since the church's centenary in 1996. Traces of the dilapidated retablos and old roofing can no longer be seen except for the remnants of narra hardwood posts and lateral walls which are still intact.

The Church houses several interesting artifacts that date back during its early years in the Spanish colonial era. Its stunning features include two centuries-old giant seashells that serve as holy water font for churchgoers. There is also the baptismal font, which was used during the Spanish era and is now kept at the Holy Door of San Salvador del Mundo Parish.

Other church features found at the church are the Church Bell that dates back to 1802; an antique statue of San Isidro Labrador, the town's patron saint, can still be seen in the altar; the centuries-old Baptismal registry which is still intact; and several antique parish records and archives which are all intact and safely kept and preserved inside a cabinet in one of the rooms of the church.

== Declaration as a National Historical Site ==
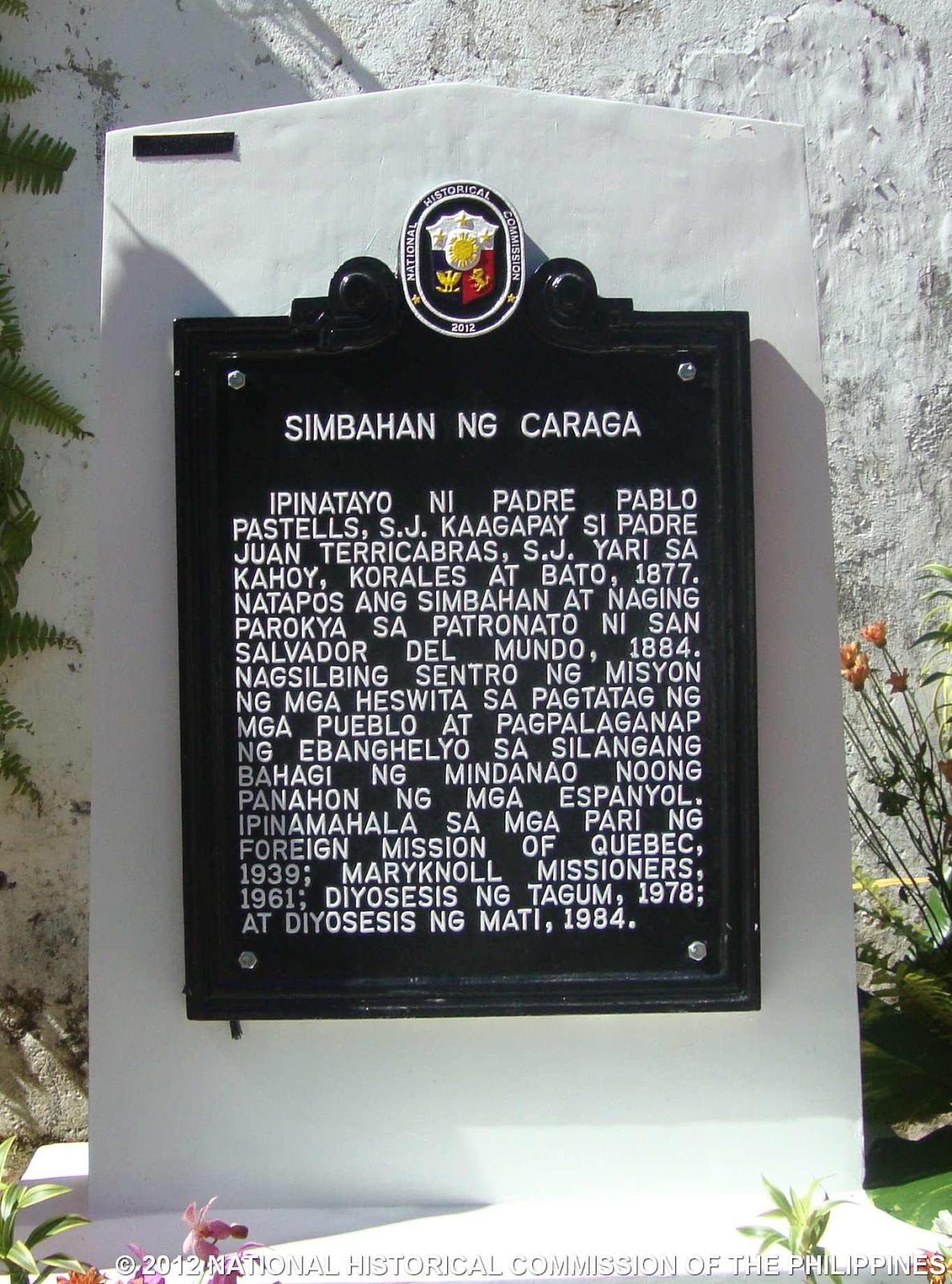
Church NHC historical marker installed in 2012

On July 16, 2012, in time of its parochial feast day, San Salvador del Mundo Church was declared a national historical site by the National Historical Commission of the Philippines (NHCP).

According to NHCP Executive Director Ludovico Badoy, the church is not only significant for the province of Davao Oriental but for the whole country, as San Salvador del Mundo is where Christianity began in the eastern part of the Philippines.

== Typhoon Pablo ==
On the morning of December 4, 2012, the 128-year San Salvador del Mundo Church was battered by Typhoon Pablo (Bopha). The strong typhoon flattened communities and plantations, left 1,000 dead, 800 missing and tens of thousands homeless, but miraculously spared Caraga Church.
