= Vincent Garcia =

Filipino politician (born 1967)

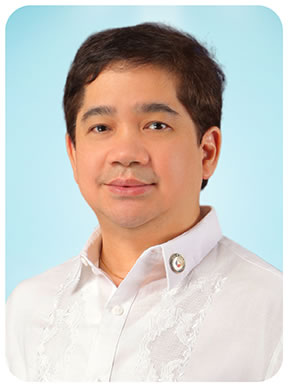
- Official portrait, 2022

Member of the Philippine House of Representatives from Davao City's 2nd district
- In office June 30, 2019 – June 30, 2025
- Preceded by: Mylene Garcia-Albano
- Succeeded by: Omar Duterte
- In office June 30, 2001 – June 30, 2010
- Preceded by: Manuel Garcia
- Succeeded by: Mylene Garcia-Albano

Personal details
- Born: Vincent de Joya Garcia; July 19, 1967 (age 59)
- Party: Lakas–CMD (2022–present)
- Other political affiliations: HNP (2018–2022); NPC (2001–2018)
- Relations: Mylene Garcia-Albano (sister); Javier Garcia-Campos (nephew)
- Parents: Manuel Garcia (father); Linda de Joya-Garcia (mother)

Vincent de Joya Garcia (born July 19, 1967) is a Filipino politician who served as a member of House of Representatives of the Philippines, represented the 2nd District of Davao City from 2019 to 2025 and previously from 2001 to 2010.

House of Representatives of the Philippines
Preceded by Manuel Garcia	Representative, 2nd District of Davao City; 2001–2010	Succeeded by Mylene Garcia-Albano
Preceded by Mylene Garcia-Albano	Representative, 2nd District of Davao City; 2019–2025	Succeeded by Omar Duterte
