= First family of the Philippines =

Family of the president of the Philippines

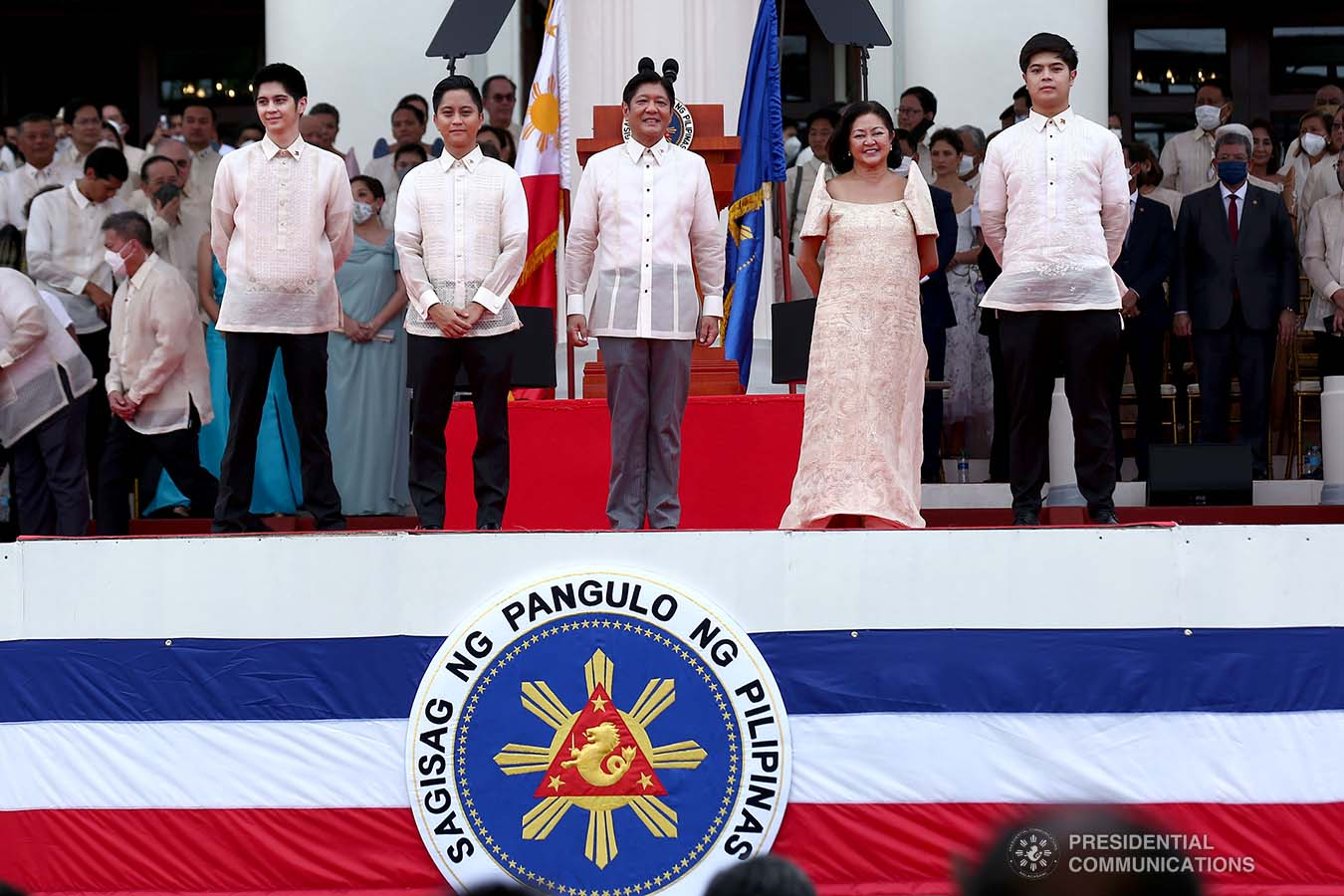
The family of President Bongbong Marcos, the current first family of the Philippines, during his inauguration on June 30, 2022. From left to right (foreground): Joseph Simon Marcos; Sandro Marcos; President Bongbong Marcos; First Lady Liza Araneta Marcos; William Vincent Marcos

The first family of the Philippines is the family of the president of the Philippines, who is both head of state and head of government of the Philippines. Members of the first family consist of the president, the spouse (often but not always also the first lady or first gentleman), and any of their children. Generally, other close relatives of the president and first spouse, such as parents, siblings, stepchildren, and grandchildren, are considered as extended members of the first family.

The current first family is the family of the 17th president of the Philippines, Bongbong Marcos, since 2022.

== Members ==
Contemporary sources primarily include the President, the First Lady, and any of their children as members of the first family. Upon the election of Bongbong Marcos as president in 2022, members of the first family currently include his wife, Liza Araneta Marcos, and their three children: Sandro, Joseph Simon, and William Vincent.

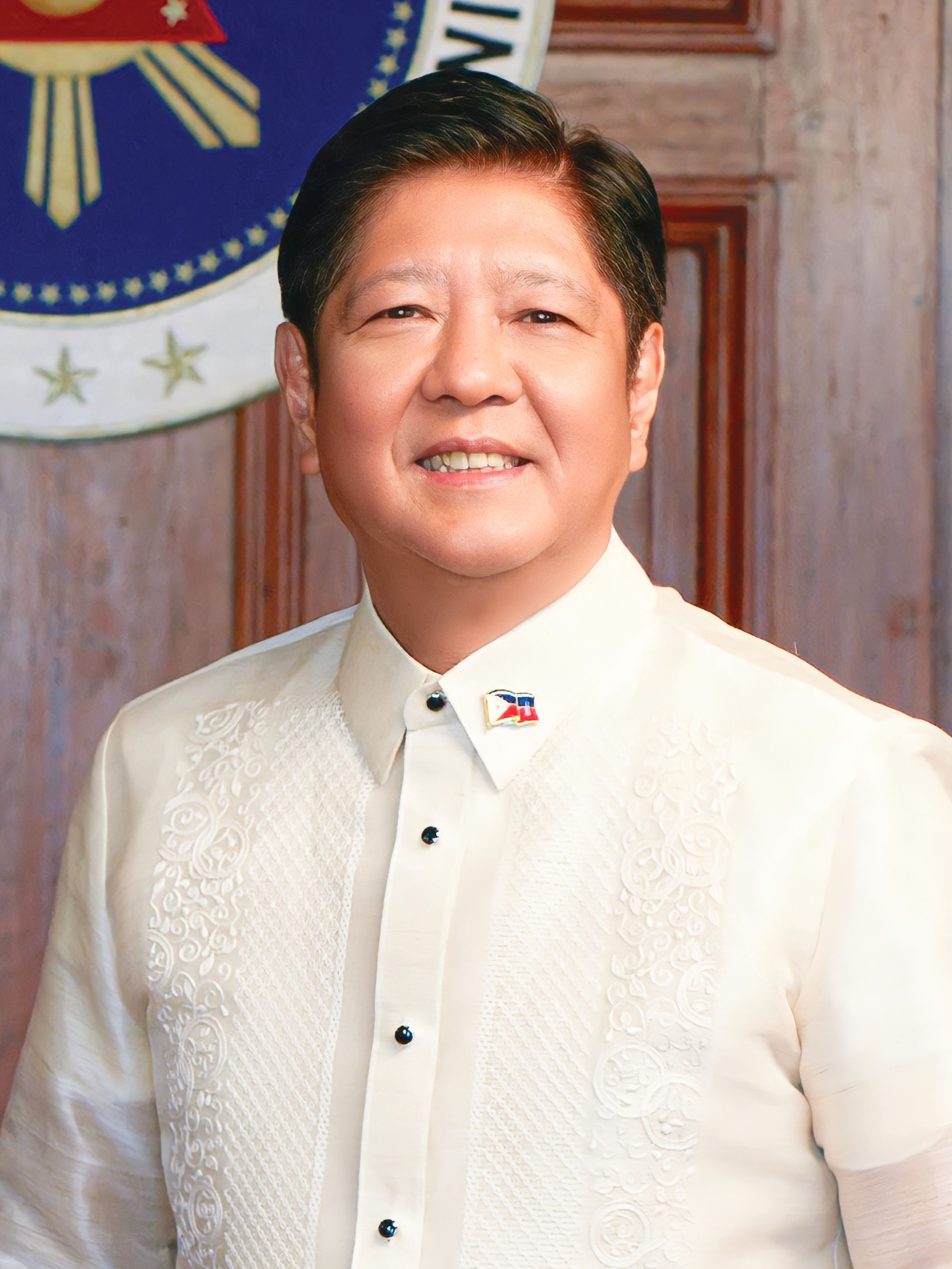
President Bongbong Marcos

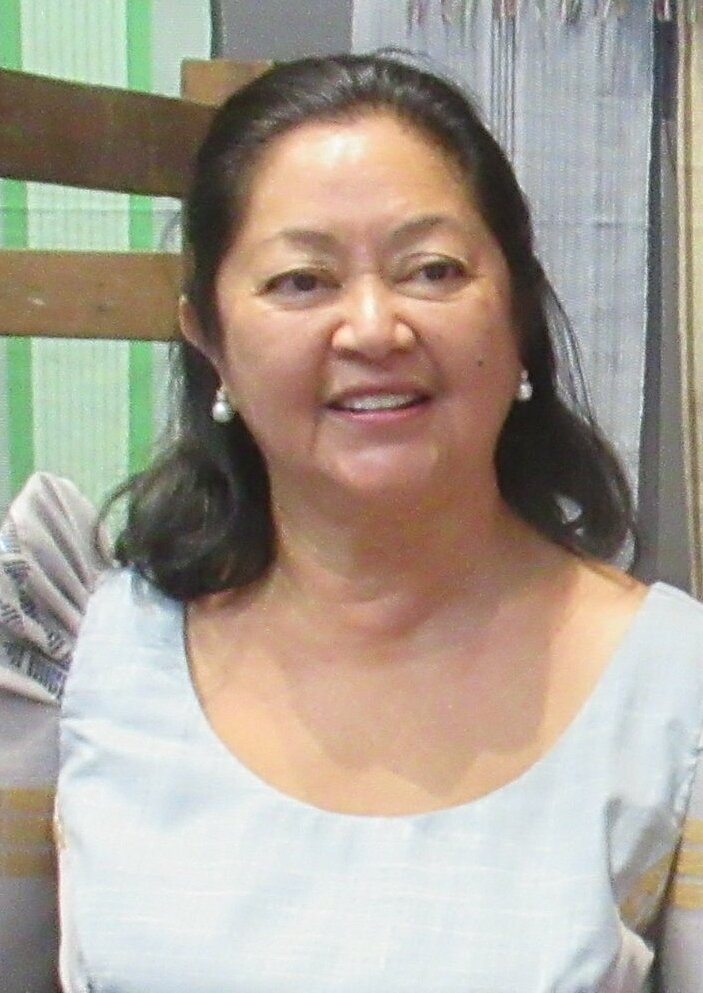
First Lady Liza Araneta Marcos

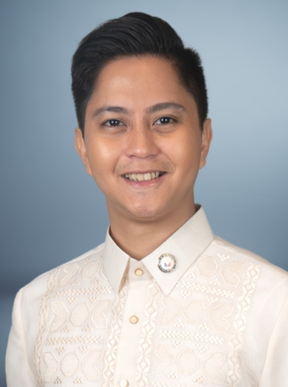
Sandro Marcos

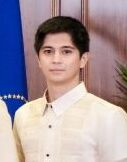
Joseph Simon Marcos

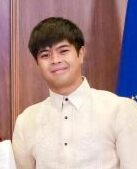
William Vincent Marcos

== History ==
It is unclear when the term "first family" was first used to refer to the family of the Philippine president, but it has been retroactively used by the media to pertain to the spouse of the president during their tenure and their children for all presidents since Emilio Aguinaldo. The earliest available sources using the term date back to the late 1980s, referring to the family of President Ferdinand Marcos.

In 2018, President Rodrigo Duterte criticized the term, saying that it was outdated and should not be used to refer to his immediate family, as he considers all Filipinos to be the "first family." As of 2022, usage of the term resurged following the election of Bongbong Marcos. It has since been extended by various media outlets to include President Marcos’s sisters, Imee, Irene, and Aimee, and his mother, former First Lady Imelda Marcos.

== List ==
No.	Portrait	First family	Years	President and spouse Children and family	Notes
1		Family of Emilio Aguinaldo	January 23, 1899 — April 19, 1901	Emilio and Hilaria Aguinaldo; Miguel and Carmen	The President's eldest daughter, Flora Victoria, died during infancy in 1899. He had three more children with Hilaria after his tenure: Emilio Jr., Maria, and Cristina. The First Lady later died from pulmonary tuberculosis in 1921. In 1930, Emilio married María Agoncillo.
2		Family of Manuel L. Quezon	November 15, 1935 — August 1, 1944	Manuel and Aurora Quezon; María Aurora, María Zeneida, and Manuel Jr.	The President's third daughter, Luisa Corazón Paz, died during infancy in 1924. The First Family during his administration was the first to reside in the Malacañang Palace.
3		Family of Jose P. Laurel	October 14, 1943 — August 17, 1945	Jose and Pacencia Laurel; Jose Jr., Jose III, Natividad, Sotero, Mariano Antonio, Rosenda Pacencia, Potenciana, Salvador, and Arsenio	
4		Family of Sergio Osmeña	August 1, 1944 — May 28, 1946	Sergio and Esperanza Osmeña; Nicasio, Vicenta, Edilberto, Milagros, Maria Paloma, Teodoro, José, Sergio Jr., Ramón, Rosalina and Victor	Nicasio, Vicenta, Edilberto, Milagros, Maria Paloma, Teodoro, José, and Sergio Jr. were the President's children from his first marriage to Estefania Veloso. Two of his children with Veloso died before he succeeded to the presidency: Jesus in 1931 and Emilio in 1942. Ramón, Rosalina and Victor were his children from his second marriage to Esperanza Limjap.
5		Family of Manuel Roxas	May 28, 1946 — April 15, 1948	Manuel and Trinidad Roxas; Rosario and Gerardo	
6		Family of Elpidio Quirino	April 17, 1948 — December 30, 1953	Elpidio Quirino; Victoria (First Lady), Tomás, Armando, Norma, and Fe Angela	The President's wife, Alicia Syquia, along with three of their children, Armando, Norma, and Fe Angela, were killed by Japanese troops during the Battle of Manila in 1945. His second daughter, Victoria, assumed the role of First Lady during her father's presidency.
7		Family of Ramon Magsaysay	December 30, 1953 — March 17, 1957	Ramon and Luz Magsaysay; Teresita, Milagros, and Ramon Jr.	
8		Family of Carlos P. Garcia	March 18, 1857 — December 30, 1961	Carlos and Leonila Garcia; Linda	
9		Family of Diosdado Macapagal	December 30, 1961 — December 30, 1965	Diosdado and Eva Macapagal; Cielo, Arturo, Gloria and Diosdado Jr.	Cielo and Arturo were the President's children from his first marriage to Purita de la Rosa, who had died earlier in 1943. The President married his second wife, Evangelina, in 1946 and had two children: Gloria (who would eventually be succeed to the presidency in 2001 and elected in her own right in 2004) and Diosdado Jr.
10		Family of Ferdinand Marcos	December 30, 1965 — February 25, 1986	Ferdinand and Imelda Marcos; Imee, Bongbong, Irene, and Aimee	Imee, Bongbong (who would eventually be elected to the presidency in 2022), and Irene were the President's children from his marriage to Imelda Romualdez. The couple later adopted a daughter, Aimee. The President lived with a common-law wife, Carmen Ortega, before 1954, with whom he had four children. Around 1970, he had an affair with former model Evelin Hegyesi and had a daughter, Analisa Josefa.
11		Family of Corazon Aquino	February 25, 1986 — June 30, 1992	Corazon Aquino; Maria Elena, Aurora Corazon, Benigno III, Victoria Elisa, and Kris	There was no First Gentleman during Corazon Aquino's presidency, as her husband, Ninoy Aquino, was assassinated in 1983.
12		Family of Fidel V. Ramos	June 30, 1992 — June 30, 1998	Fidel and Amelita Ramos; Angelita, Josephine, Carolina, Cristina, and Gloria	
13		Family of Joseph Estrada	June 30, 1998 — January 20, 2001	Joseph Estrada and Loi Ejercito; Jinggoy, Jackie and Jude	Jinggoy, Jackie, and Jude were the President's children from his marriage to Loi Ejercito. He has eight children from several extramarital relationships: With former actress Guia Gomez: Joseph Victor; With former actress Peachy Osorio: Joel and Ma. Theresa; With former air hostess known only as 'Larena': Jason; With former actress Laarni Enriquez: Jerika, Jacob, and Jake; With former flight attendant Joy Melendrez: Jose Mari
14		Family of Gloria Macapagal Arroyo	January 20, 2001 — June 30, 2010	Gloria Macapagal Arroyo and Jose Miguel Arroyo; Juan Miguel, Evangelina and Diosdado	The succession to the presidency of Gloria Macapagal Arroyo in 2001 marked the second time that she will officially reside in Malacañang Palace; the first was from 1961 to 1965 as a daughter of former president Diosdado Macapagal. Her husband, Jose Miguel, is the first and, to date, the only First Gentleman of the Philippines.
15		Family of Benigno Aquino III	June 30, 2010 — June 30, 2016	Benigno Aquino III	The President never married or had children. His four sisters have, in several occasions, served as unofficial first ladies.
16		Family of Rodrigo Duterte	June 30, 2016 — June 30, 2022	Rodrigo Duterte; Paolo, Sara, Sebastian, and Veronica	Paolo, Sara, and Sebastian are the President's children from his marriage to Elizabeth Zimmerman (annulled in 2000), while Veronica is his daughter with common-law wife Honeylet Avanceña. Avanceña was not officially designated as the First Lady during Duterte's presidency.
17		Family of Bongbong Marcos	June 30, 2022 — present	Bongbong and Liza Araneta Marcos; Sandro, Simon, and Vincent	The election of Bongbong Marcos in 2022 marked the second time that he will officially reside in Malacañang Palace; the first was from 1965 to 1986 as the son of former president Ferdinand Marcos.

== See also ==
- Aquino family
- Duterte family
- Marcos family
