= Avanceña =

Avanceña is a surname. Notable people with this surname include:

- Ramón Avanceña (1872–1957), 4th Chief Justice of the Supreme Court of the Philippines from 1925 to 1941.
- Amando Avanceña (1879–1953), Filipino lawyer, hacendero, and politician.
- Honeylet Avanceña (born 1970), businesswoman, former nurse and domestic partner of Rodrigo Duterte
- Veronica Avanceña Duterte (born 2004), American-born Filipino socialite who is the youngest daughter of Rodrigo Duterte
- Hector Avanceña Zabala (born 1971), Filipino musician and producer
