= Girlie Balaba =

Filipino politician

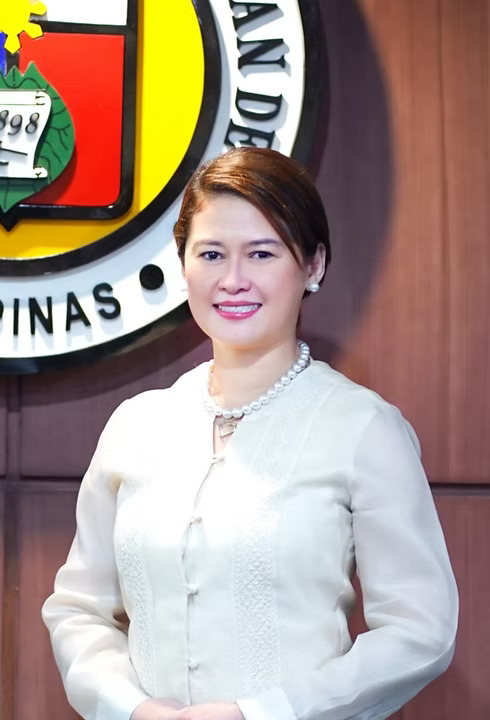
- Official portrait, 2025

Member of the Cagayan de Oro City Council from the 2nd district
- Incumbent
- Assumed office June 30, 2019

Personal details
- Born: Joyleen Mercedes Labis Balaba; October 23, 1972 (age 54) Cagayan de Oro, Philippines
- Party: Partido Demokratiko Pilipino (2018–present)

Joyleen Mercedes "Girlie" Labis Balaba (born October 23, 1972) is a Filipino politician, nurse and former broadcast journalist currently serving as a city councilor of Cagayan de Oro. A member of the Partido Demokratiko Pilipino party, she pushed for legislation supporting the marginalized sectors in the city. She previously served as a news reporter at ABS-CBN Davao.

Known as a "close friend" of former president Rodrigo Duterte, Balaba led protests against his arrest in March 2025 and visited The Hague, Netherlands while he is detained there by the International Criminal Court.

== Career ==
Balaba served as a news reporter in TV Patrol Davao at ABS-CBN Davao in the late 1990s and early 2000s.

In 2007, Balaba passed the Nurse Licensure Examination.

=== Political career ===
In 2019, Balaba ran for councilor in the second district of Cagayan De Oro as part of the slate of reelectionist mayor Oscar Moreno under PDP-Laban (now Partido Demokratiko Pilipino), placing first among all candidates in the district. In her candidacy, she vowed to support the marginalized sectors in the city, and was endorsed by President Rodrigo Duterte.

In 2022, Balaba was one of the principal authors of the ordinance establishing a mental health program in Cagayan de Oro. In 2023, Balaba wrote with councilor Ian Mark Nacaya an ordinance regulating the use of the Halal logo by businesses operating in the city. Later that year, Balaba principally authored an ordinance providing a social pension for impoverished adults and disabled children.

In early 2024, Balaba, as chairwoman of the council committee on social services, filed a proposed ordinance countering the online sexual abuse of minors in the city; the ordinance was passed by August 2024. By March 2025, Balaba's authored ordinance with vice mayor Jocelyn Rodriguez that institutionalizes Cagayan de Oro as a "justice zone" against the online exploitation and abuse of children was passed into law.

== Personal life ==
Balaba is known as a mistress of President Rodrigo Duterte. Rumors have persisted that she dated Duterte during his mayoralty in Davao City, in spite of him being with his common-law wife Honeylet Avanceña. According to MindaNews, the relationship was known as a fact in Davao City. In 2015, she was noted to have joined Duterte's nationwide "listening tour" prior to him filing his certificate of candidacy for president, although she did not appear during Duterte's presidential campaign. In late 2019, Duterte acknowledged the rumored relationship, stating in jest: "Ms. Girlie. We used to be. Now, she no longer wants to beso-beso so I spanked her... Oh, you. Before, you can make a beso-beso with me forever. Now... [you] might be guilty but okay, that's all right." After Duterte's arrest in March 2025, Balaba led and attended protests in both Cagayan de Oro and the Hague, the Netherlands calling for his release.
