= Martin Delgra III =

Filipino lawyer

Chairman of the Land Transportation Franchising and Regulatory Board
- In office 2016–2022
- President: Rodrigo Duterte

Personal details
- Born: Martin Belleza Delgra III; November 11

Martin Belleza Delgra III (born November 11), nicknamed "Chuckbong", is a Filipino lawyer who previously served as chairman of the Land Transportation Franchising and Regulatory Board from 2016 to 2022. A self-affirmed loyalist of former president Rodrigo Duterte, Delgra served as his legal counsel during his 2016 presidential campaign, and was among the few people who accompanied Duterte at Villamor Air Base when he was arrested by police authorities in March 2025.

== Early life and education ==
Martin Delgra III was born to Martin V. Delgra Jr. (1921–1977), a lawyer, and Carmen "Bebe" B. Delgra (1928–2021), and has six siblings.

Delgra passed the Philippine Bar Examination in 1988.

== Career ==
Delgra initially began his private law practice in the island province of Basilan, working for three years alongside Spanish bishop José María Querejeta. After returning to Davao City, he worked at Delgra, Lanzona and Quilatan Law Offices, based in Ecoland, Davao City.

=== LTFRB chairman ===
Delgra served as chairman of the Land Transportation Franchising and Regulatory Board (LTFRB) from 2016 to 2022. In 2017, upon president Duterte's issuance of an executive order banning portraits of himself in government offices and replacing them with national heroes, Delgra put up a picture of Lapulapu on his office wall alongside the presidential portrait of Duterte, reasoning that he considers both to be his heroes.

=== Post-government activities ===
Delgra continued to serve as Duterte's legal counsel after stepping down as LTFRB chairman in 2022.

On March 11, 2025, Delgra accompanied Duterte and his family at the Villamor Air Base when Duterte was served an arrest warrant by police authorities led by General Nicolas Torre III, chief of the Criminal Investigation and Detection Group (CIDG).

== Personal life ==
Delgra is a resident of Davao City. He is an avid mountain climber and scuba diver, and has advocated for environmental protection in the face of climate change.
