= Spouse of the president of the Philippines =

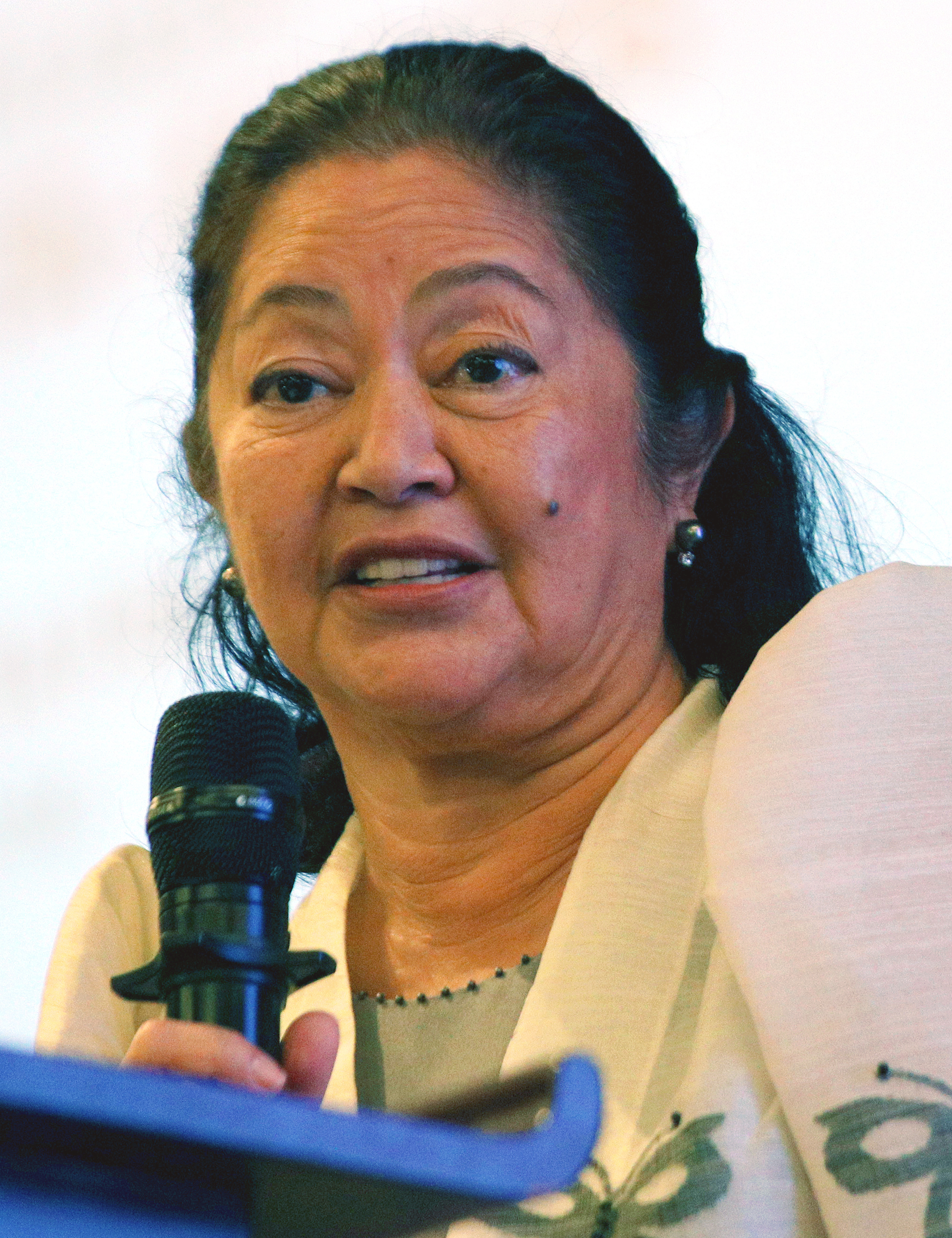
Liza Araneta Marcos, the wife of President Bongbong Marcos.

The following is a list of spouses of presidents of the Philippines.

Customarily, the wife or husband of the president held the title of First Lady or First Gentleman serving functional role at the Malacañang Palace. Hence the titles are also erroneously used to refer to the president's spouse.

Three spouses, that of Elpidio Quirino, Diosdado Macapagal and Corazon Aquino, were already deceased at the start of their respective partner's presidencies although Macapagal was married to his second wife at the start of his presidency.

Benigno Aquino III is the only unmarried president.

== List ==
Portrait	Spouse (Note: Maiden name for female spouses.)	Marriage		President
Portrait	Spouse	Start	End	President
	Hilaria del Rosario (1877–1921)	1896	1905 (Note: A copy of Hilaria del Rosario's 1920 Last will and testament stated that she and Aguinaldo were separated for 15 years at the time the document was crafted. Based on the document, the separation happened in 1905.)	Emilio Aguinaldo
	María Agoncillo (1879–1963)	1930	1963	Emilio Aguinaldo
	Aurora Aragón (1888–1949)	1918	1944	Manuel L. Quezon
	Pacencia Hidalgo (1889–1963)	1911	1959	José P. Laurel
	Estefania Veloso (1875–1918)	1901	1918	Sergio Osmeña
	Esperanza Limjap (1894–1978)	1920	1961	Sergio Osmeña
	Trinidad de Leon (1990–1995)	1921	1948	Manuel Roxas
	Alicia Syquia (1903–1945)	1921	1945	Elpidio Quirino
	Luz Banzon (1914–2004)	1933	1957	Ramon Magsaysay
	Leonila Dimataga (1906–1994)	1933	1971	Carlos P. Garcia
	Purita de la Rosa (1916–1943)	1938	1943	Diosdado Macapagal
	Evangelina Macaraeg (1915–1999)	1946	1997	Diosdado Macapagal
	Imelda Romualdez (born 1929)	1954	1989	Ferdinand Marcos
	Ninoy Aquino (1932–1983)	1954	1983	Corazon Cojuangco Aquino
	Amelita Martinez (b. 1926)	1954	2022	Fidel V. Ramos
	Loi Pimentel (born 1930)	1959	—N/a	Joseph Estrada
	Jose Miguel Arroyo (born 1945)	1968	—N/a	Gloria Macapagal Arroyo
	Elizabeth Zimmerman (born 1948)	1973	2000; Civilly annulled	Rodrigo Duterte
	Honeylet Avanceña (born 1970)	2005 (Note: Began cohabiting with Duterte as his common-law wife.)	—N/a	Rodrigo Duterte
	Liza Araneta (born 1959)	1993	—N/a	Bongbong Marcos

- Entries in dark grey denote an individual as not married during their partner's presidencies either due to death, annulment, or marrying afterwards.
- Benigno Aquino III has never been married.
