= Arrest of Rodrigo Duterte =

2025 arrest of former Philippine president

- Part of the International Criminal Court investigation in the Philippines
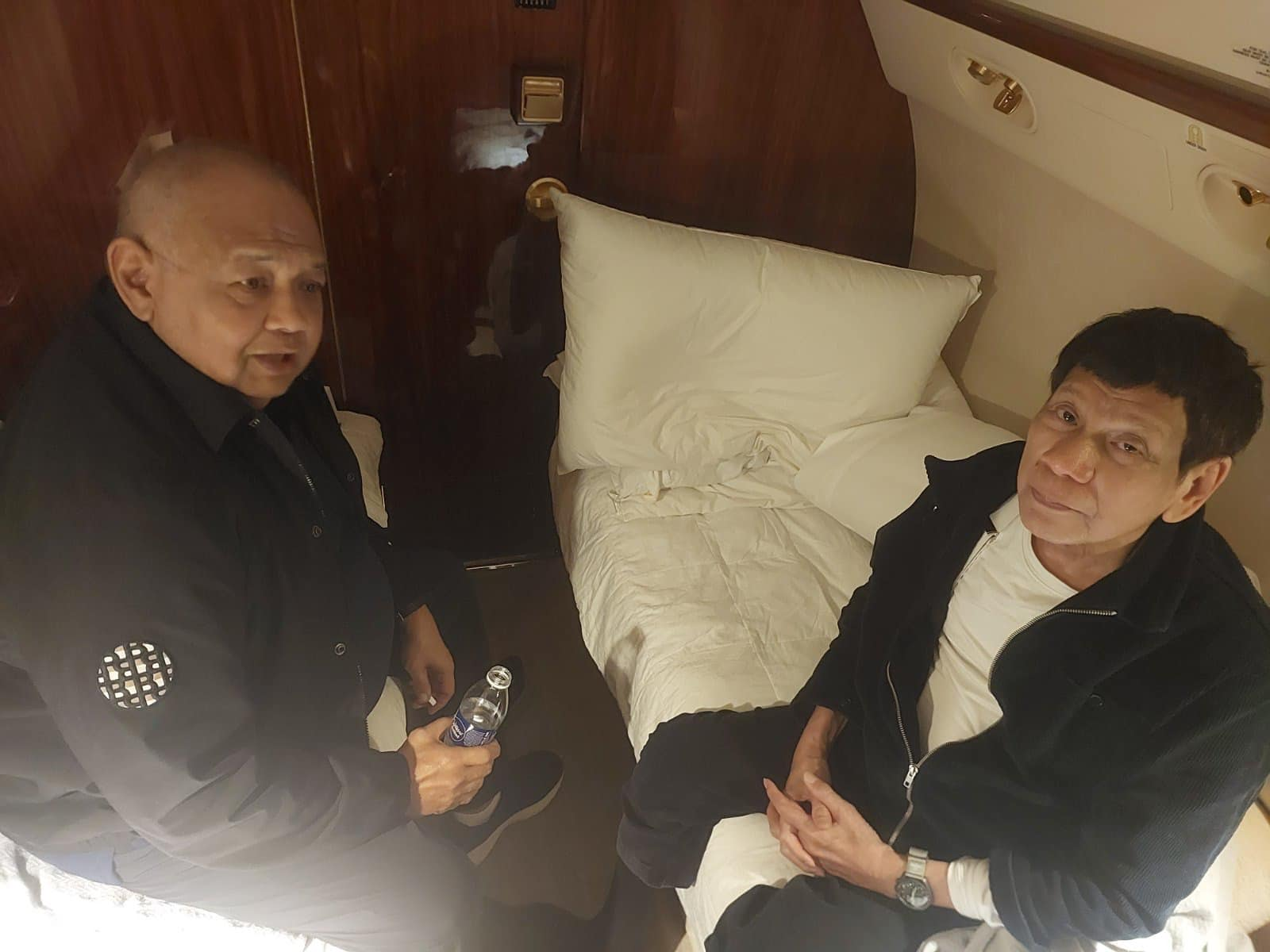
- Salvador Medialdea (left) and Rodrigo Duterte (right) on board the jet to The Hague on 11 March 2025, in a photograph distributed by Bong Go
- Date: March 11, 2025
- Location: Ninoy Aquino International Airport, Pasay, Philippines
- Cause: Alleged crimes against humanity perpetuated by the Duterte administration during the Philippine drug war, charged by the International Criminal Court (ICC)
- Participants: Philippine National Police (Criminal Investigation and Detection Group); Interpol; Philippine Center on Transnational Crimes
- Arrests: Rodrigo Duterte

On March 11, 2025, former Philippine president Rodrigo Duterte was arrested by the Philippine National Police and Interpol in Oplan Tugis (Filipino for 'Operation Pursuit') under an International Criminal Court (ICC) warrant charging him with crimes against humanity related to the Philippine drug war. Duterte arrived at Ninoy Aquino International Airport in Metro Manila on March 11 after attending a political rally in Hong Kong. Once the warrant was executed, he was held in custody at the nearby Villamor Air Base and then transferred to the Netherlands, where he is expected to face trial in The Hague. The operation was largely planned by police general Nicolas Torre.

Duterte was indicted on charges of crimes against humanity, which include extrajudicial killings during his tenure as Mayor of Davao City and as President of the Philippines, until the country's withdrawal from the Rome Statute in 2019. Based on the statute, the ICC retains jurisdiction for crimes committed while the country was still a member, regardless of later withdrawal. He is the fifth Philippine president to be indicted and arrested, following Emilio Aguinaldo (1945), Jose P. Laurel (1945), Joseph Estrada (2001), and Gloria Macapagal Arroyo (2011). He is also the first Philippine president to face an international tribunal and the first leader from Asia to face trial before the ICC.

Duterte was arrested amid an escalating feud between the Marcos and Duterte political families, although President Bongbong Marcos himself expressed melancholy regarding the arrest. Analysts have described Duterte's arrest and surrender to the ICC as remarkably quick and trouble-free, as well as a "seismic" precedent-setting event that could inform how other criminally charged world leaders would potentially be arrested.

== Background ==
=== Launch of the ICC investigation ===
Rodrigo Duterte was investigated by the International Criminal Court (ICC) for alleged crimes against humanity. The investigation covered Duterte's links to the Davao Death Squad, which is estimated to have killed at least a thousand people since the 1990s, as well as reports of extrajudicial killings of alleged drug dealers and users during his presidency, limited to the period before the Philippines withdrew from the ICC in 2019.

In 2017, Filipino lawyer Jude Sabio submitted a 77-page document to the ICC titled "The Situation of Mass Murder in the Philippines", accusing President Duterte and 11 other officials of mass murder and crimes against humanity. Similarly, then-senator Antonio Trillanes and members of the Magdalo Party-List, led by then-representative Gary Alejano, filed a 45-page supplemental complaint requesting charges of crimes against humanity, supporting Sabio's earlier filing.

The ICC's jurisdiction in the Philippines applies only to the period when the country was a state party to the Rome Statute (November 1, 2011 – March 16, 2019). This includes nearly three years of Duterte's presidency, during which the Philippine drug war was at its peak. The Supreme Court of the Philippines, in a 2021 ruling, commented on the withdrawal from the Rome Statute and stated that the Philippines still has an obligation to cooperate in the ICC proceedings.

=== Climate during the Bongbong Marcos presidency ===
Under President Bongbong Marcos's administration, the government maintained its stance of non-cooperation with the ICC investigation. However, by 2024, it acknowledged that it could not prevent investigators from acting independently. In November 2024, the Philippine government reaffirmed its stance on the ICC but stated that it would surrender Duterte if he were indicted, citing its obligation to Interpol.

In September 2024, police authorities arrested pastor Apollo Quiboloy, leader of the Davao-based Kingdom of Jesus Christ and a Duterte ally, in a two-week operation led by acting Davao police chief Nicolas Torre.

=== Preparation for Duterte's arrest ===
In May 2024, the Department of Justice began briefing President Marcos on the possible scenarios in which the ICC would issue a warrant of arrest for Duterte, as well as its legal team's preparations for how to handle them.

According to The New York Times, in preparation for the possible issuance of an arrest warrant by the ICC, the Philippine National Police (PNP) had discreetly prepared an 80-page plan for Duterte's arrest with the code name Oplan Tugis, or Operation Pursuit in English. In it, they laid out scenarios for how the arrest of Duterte might play out in either Manila or Davao City, with maps of Duterte's properties as well as his allies' properties included in the document. The PNP conducted four dry runs of Duterte's arrest at Terminal 3 of the Ninoy Aquino International Airport (NAIA). PNP police general Nicolas Torre himself later recalled planning the entire operation once it was entrusted to him, stating that "I really told them that let me[...] succeed and fail on my plans. Because if I succeed, I succeed based on my plans. If I fail, I fail on my plans also, so there's no one else to blame but me."

== Prelude to arrest ==
=== Issuance of warrant ===
The International Criminal Court's (ICC) Pre-Trial Chamber I issued a warrant on March 7, 2025, at The Hague, with Judges Iulia Motoc, Reine Alapini-Gansou, and Socorro Flores Liera presiding. The ICC reached out to Interpol for the execution of the warrant. While rumors suggested that a warrant was imminent as Duterte flew to Hong Kong a few days prior, its legal existence was not immediately disclosed to the public. The document was reclassified from "secret" to "public" on March 11. The Presidential Communications Office confirmed the warrant in a press release hours after its execution.

In a press conference shortly after the plane bound for the Netherlands departed, President Bongbong Marcos stated the warrant had been sent to the Office of the President of the Philippines via the Interpol Manila office at around 03:00 PHT (UTC+08:00) on March 11, 2025. He added that authorities proceeded with serving the warrant in coordination with the Philippine National Police (PNP). He emphasized that the PNP enforced the warrant in coordination with Interpol, not the ICC, of which the Philippines was formerly a member.

=== Hong Kong PDP rally ===
On the morning of March 7, Rodrigo Duterte flew to Hong Kong with his common-law wife, Honeylet Avanceña; their daughter, Veronica "Kitty" Duterte; their adoptive daughter, Mira; (Note: Since 2022, a child named Mira is seen being raised by Duterte and Avanceña alongside Veronica (Kitty), though there are conflicting reports on whether she is a child or a grandchild of Duterte.) his former executive secretary, Salvador Medialdea; and his entourage. They had initially traveled from Davao City to Manila the previous evening. His eldest daughter, Vice President Sara Duterte, flew to Hong Kong later on to join him. Duterte had already heard about the imminent arrest warrant from the ICC, and while in Hong Kong, he and his family debated whether to remain in Chinese territory or return to the Philippines.

On March 8, the Hong Kong-based newspaper The Standard first reported Duterte's presence in the city after he was spotted in Causeway Bay with his entourage, amid circulating rumors that the ICC had issued an arrest warrant for him. Salvador Panelo, Duterte's former presidential legal counsel, stated that his trip was solely to thank supporters in Hong Kong at a Partido Demokratiko Pilipino (PDP) campaign sortie. He added that he would join Duterte the following day. The Philippine government did not confirm at the time whether the ICC had issued an arrest warrant but stated, "If Interpol will ask the necessary assistance from the government, it is obliged to follow" and that "the government is prepared in any eventuality".

On March 9, Duterte attended a PDP campaign sortie organized by the Kingdom of Jesus Christ (KOJC) at the Southorn Stadium in Wan Chai, where he promoted his party's slate of senatorial candidates. Others who attended the sortie include Vice President Sara Duterte and Senators Bong Go and Robin Padilla, as well as senatorial candidates Vic Rodriguez, Raul Lambino, Rodante Marcoleta, Jimmy Bondoc, and Phillip Salvador. Senator Ronald dela Rosa was expected to attend but was unable to, while a standee for jailed pastor and KOJC founder Apollo Quiboloy, a senatorial candidate, was displayed on the campaign stage. Most of the attendees were female overseas Filipino workers (OFWs). In his speech, Duterte acknowledged the rumored arrest warrant, expressing both defiance toward the ICC and readiness to face arrest. Jokingly, he added that the crowd could contribute "$5 or $10" each to fund a monument of himself beside a José Rizal statue in Davao City.

From March 10 to the morning of March 11, hundreds of police officers were deployed at Francisco Bangoy International Airport in Davao City, the Clark Freeport Zone in Pampanga, and Metro Manila. The Manila Times reported that this was in preparation for the possible arrest of a high-profile but unidentified individual, widely speculated to be Duterte, who was set to return to the Philippines from Hong Kong. According to a source cited by the GMA news program 24 Oras, the deployment of two battalions of SAF officers in Davao City was part of the "psychological warfare" strategy of the Criminal Investigation and Detection Group to discourage Duterte from directly heading to the city. Prior to Duterte's return to the Philippines, his group had booked five separate flights back to the country in an attempt to obfuscate Duterte's actual arrival.

Rumors circulated that Duterte had sought political asylum in China. However, Sara Duterte stated that her father had not been in contact with Chinese officials during his stay, while China's Foreign Minister Guo Jiakun also denied receiving any asylum requests from the Dutertes. A source cited by 24 Oras refuted this, stating that Duterte had indeed issued an asylum request that was denied by China. The source added that, although the CIDG had preferred to arrest Duterte in Hong Kong, the Hong Kong Police Force refused to cooperate due to China not being an ICC member, but complied with the escorting of Duterte to ensure that he boarded his plane back to the Philippines.

== Oplan Tugis ==
=== Arrest ===
On March 11, more than 300 police officers, led by Philippine National Police (PNP) chief Rommel Marbil and Criminal Investigation and Detection Group (CIDG) director Nicolas Torre, were deployed at Ninoy Aquino International Airport (NAIA) Terminal 3 in anticipation of Duterte's arrival from Hong Kong, with the CIDG instructing air traffic controllers to direct Duterte's plane towards Boarding Gate 116. The arresting team itself consisted of 60 CIDG officers and 20 Special Action Force personnel. At 09:20 PHT (UTC+08:00), Duterte arrived at NAIA on Cathay Pacific Flight 907. While Duterte was waiting for his wheelchair, retired general Anthony Alcantara, executive director of the Philippine Center on Transnational Crimes, met him on the plane, informed him of the ICC-issued warrant and escorted him to the jet bridge at Boarding Gate 116. There, Alcantara, Department of Justice prosecutor general Richard Fadullon and Special Envoy on Transnational Crime Markus Lacanilao (Interpol's representative) arrested him with the support of PNP officers. The reading of Miranda rights was postponed at the request of Duterte's party, which insisted that they be read only in a more secure location in an attempt to prevent him from being taken into custody. Lawyers Salvador Medialdea and his wife, Maria Bertola "Betty" D. Medialdea, both former cabinet officials during Duterte's presidency, were present during his arrest. Duterte's daughter, Kitty, livestreamed his arrest, while his common-law wife, Avanceña, tried to dissuade him from complying with police authorities, calling them "abusive" and claiming they had no warrant.

Aside from the Medialdeas, Duterte's other lawyers, aides, and doctors were prevented from approaching him when he was taken into police custody. Senator Go, who arrived separately from Duterte, and lawyer Silvestre Bello III informed the media at the airport about Duterte's detention and separation from his aides.

Go stated that police denied his request to see Duterte despite his claim that an ambulance was already waiting for Duterte's planned medical checkup. According to Torre and former senator Antonio Trillanes, however, Duterte had a private jet already waiting for him at NAIA when he arrived. Most of the police officers escorting Duterte out of the airport were women, per a request from Interior Secretary Jonvic Remulla, who anticipated potential outbursts from Duterte against male officers.

The PNP later placed its regional units and national support on heightened alert, starting March 11, in anticipation of potential protests and civil disturbances following Duterte's arrest.

=== Detention and transfer to The Hague ===
Following his arrest, Duterte was taken to Villamor Air Base, where he and his family were housed in Maharlika Hall within the 250th Presidential Airlift Wing. They were joined by the Medialdea couple, lawyer Martin Delgra III, retired general Filmore B. Escobal and former NICA director Alex Paul Monteagudo. During his detention, Duterte was allowed to sleep in a room next to the hall. Torre read Duterte his Miranda rights and presented a printed copy of the arrest warrant. Despite Torre's repeated insistence, Duterte refused to comply with the booking procedure. Senator Go arrived at Villamor with former government officials Bello, Lorraine Badoy-Partosa, and Trixie Cruz-Angeles, but was denied entry to the air base.

Duterte's standoff with PNP officials over his refusal to leave for The Hague in the Netherlands lasted approximately 12 hours. During an attempt to separate Duterte from his family, his daughter Kitty tried to push through a group of police officers to reach his room. Avanceña then struck a SAF officer on the head with her smartphone, allegedly in response to being separated from her daughter. The SAF officer was later hospitalized but soon recovered. Towards the end of the standoff, Duterte's legal counsel, Salvador Medialdea, attempted to block the PNP from escorting Duterte to a coaster bound for a jet headed to the Netherlands at Villamor. When Medialdea challenged Torre to detain him, Torre briefly handcuffed him for obstruction of justice and read him his Miranda rights. Medialdea soon acquiesced, and when Torre made moves to arrest Delgra as well, Duterte submitted and boarded the coaster to the jet.

In later interviews, Torre stated that the PNP accommodated nearly all of Duterte's requests, including food, medical attention, and legal counsel, except for his request not to be taken to The Hague. When Torre asked Avanceña for Duterte's medical conditions, prescribed medicines and possible list of allergies, she declined to answer. According to Torre and PNP spokesperson Jean Fajardo, the PNP exercised "maximum tolerance" throughout Duterte's arrest and detention, prohibiting officers from making physical contact with him and instructing them not to retaliate against any verbal or physical assault from his party.

For the Philippine government, the process of securing flight permits from other countries for Duterte's chartered plane was a difficult task. Some countries such as Vietnam, Oman and the United Arab Emirates took hours before they responded to the request, with the latter two having shortened their working hours in accordance with Ramadan.

On Facebook, lawyer and PDP senatorial candidate Raul Lambino falsely claimed that a temporary restraining order (TRO) had been issued by the Supreme Court for police authorities, which would have prevented them from bringing Duterte to The Hague. KOJC lawyer Israelito Torreon went to the court at night with Lambino to allegedly confirm the TRO's issuance and receive the hard copy. Although he later recanted his claim, Lambino was soon disparaged by lawmakers for spreading false information, with the Supreme Court itself stating that it will investigate how the false TRO claim had spread.

After a delay of a few hours due to revisions in the manifest (Avanceña declined to join Duterte, allegedly citing a lack of a passport despite having traveled to Hong Kong with him), a government-chartered Gulfstream G550 jet (registered RP-C5219) departed Manila at 23:03 PHT (UTC+08:00) carrying Duterte, his legal counsel Medialdea, and his party. The jet, leased from the Office of the President of the Philippines, made a layover at Al Maktoum International Airport in the United Arab Emirates before landing at Rotterdam The Hague Airport in the Netherlands at 4:54 p.m. local time the next day.

President Bongbong Marcos held a press conference minutes after Duterte's plane departed Villamor Air Base, clarifying that the arrest was carried out not on behalf of the ICC (which the Philippines is not a member of), but in cooperation with Interpol. Marcos emphasized that the Philippines, as part of the international community, must uphold its commitments and responsibilities.

== Protests and mass actions ==
Widespread protests and mass actions, both in support of and against Duterte, were held across the Philippines and abroad following his arrest. Pro-Duterte protests were held mostly in Mindanao and the Visayas.

=== Pro-Duterte protests ===
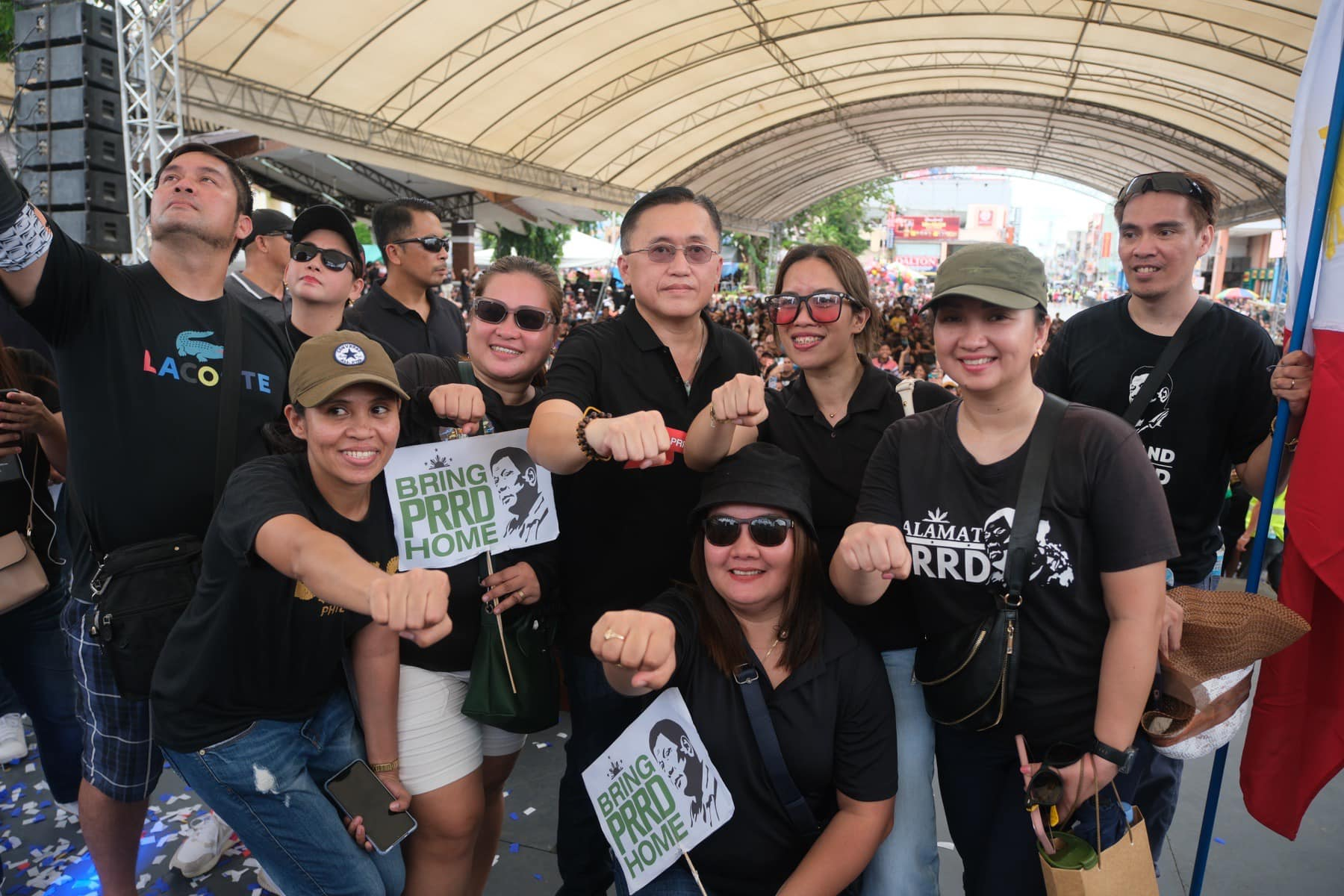
Senator Bong Go (center) poses with protesters making the "Duterte fist" gesture at the Araw ng Dabaw (Davao Day) rally in Davao City on March 16, 2025

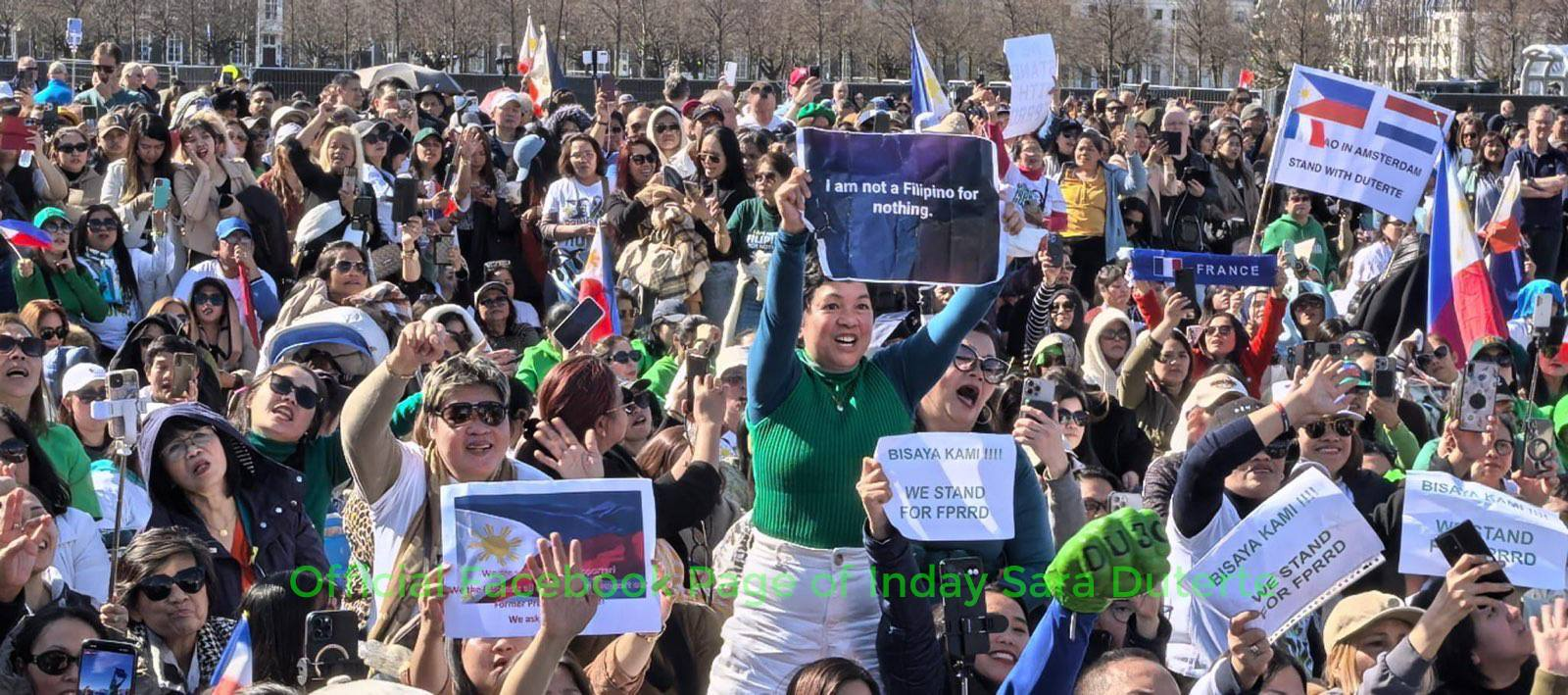
Protest at Malieveld in The Hague, Netherlands, on March 23, 2025

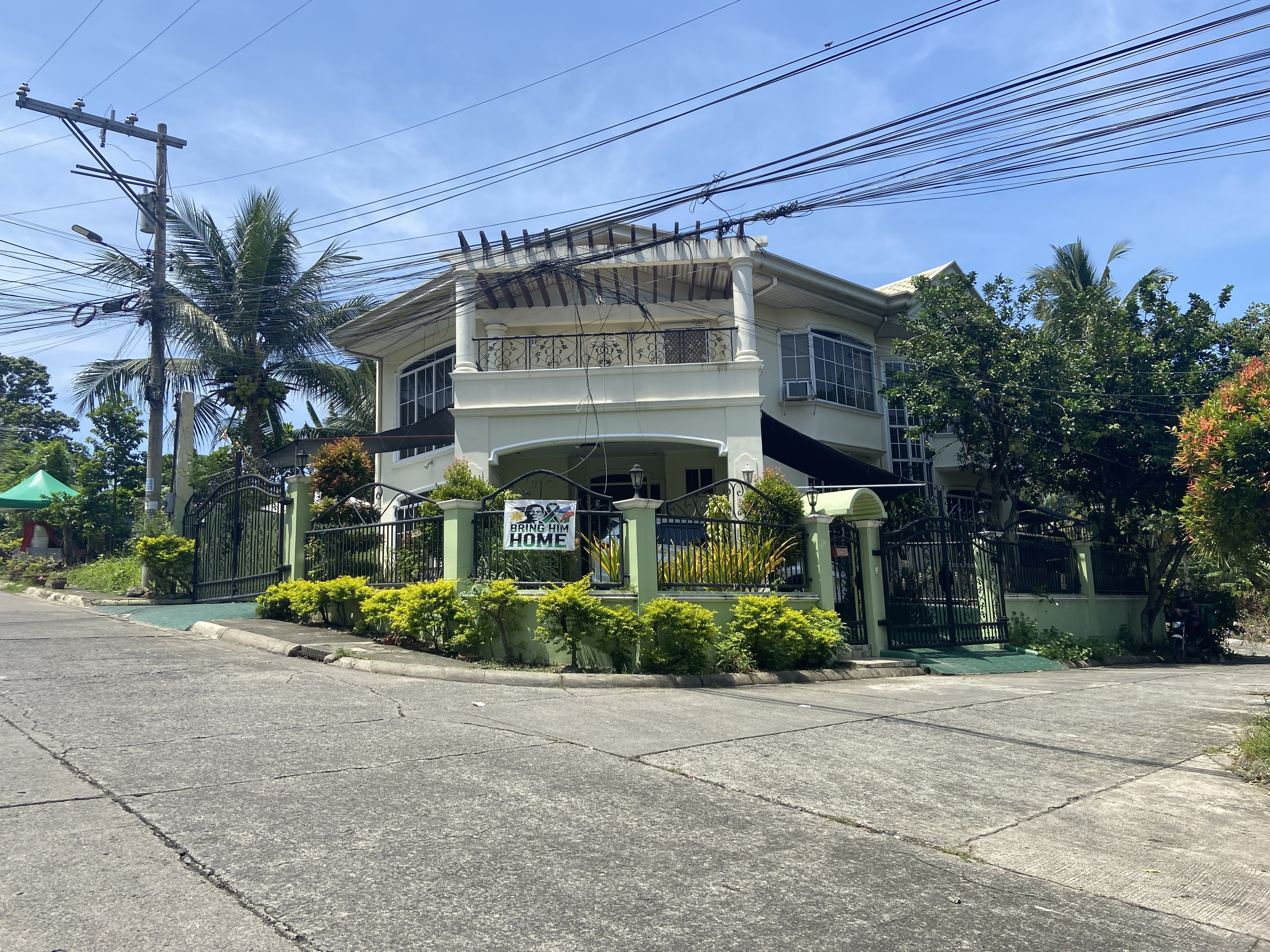
A house in Davao City showing a "Bring Him Home" poster, suggesting their support for Duterte's return to his hometown following his arrest.

Shortly after Duterte's arrest was announced, people gathered outside the gates of Villamor Air Base in Pasay, where he was detained, to protest his arrest and criticize the government. In Manila, nearly 1,000 supporters gathered at Liwasang Bonifacio in support of Duterte on March 15, while a motorcade was held in different parts of Metro Manila. Another motorcade rally from different parts of the metro was held on March 16. Other cities in Luzon that held demonstrations include Angeles City and Baguio.

In Duterte's hometown, Davao City, hundreds of Duterte's supporters, including city and barangay officials, held a candlelight rally at Rizal Park. Thousands of Davao residents rallied for Duterte during the cityhood festivities on March 16. In Iligan, hundreds of protesters gathered along Roxas and Quezon Avenues, with former Iligan mayor Franklin Quijano and lawyer Manuel Salibay urging Iliganons to call for Duterte's release. In Cotabato City, an estimated 4,000 supporters staged a unity walk in the city's plaza and held a prayer rally. Prayer rallies were held in General Santos and Kidapawan. Hundreds more assembled across Mindanao, including in the cities of Bansalan, Bislig, Bongao, Butuan, Digos, Isulan, Jolo, Koronadal, Marawi, Midsayap, Pagadian, Panabo, Tacurong, Tagum, and Zamboanga City, and in the provinces of Bukidnon and Misamis Oriental. In Cagayan de Oro, protests were led by councilor Girlie Balaba, a close friend of Duterte who is often cited as his former partner.

In the Visayas, supporters in Cebu City, Iloilo City, and Mandaue protested. A motorcade rally was held in Kalibo on March 16.

Many protesters at these rallies sang Filipino patriotic songs and "Try That in a Small Town" by American singer Jason Aldean, an anthem for Diehard Duterte Supporters.

Across various online platforms and among Overseas Filipino Workers, calls have emerged for Duterte's return to the Philippines.

=== Anti-Duterte rallies ===
Students from the University of the Philippines Diliman staged a rally within the university at noon on the day of Duterte's arrest. Later, they joined various progressive groups led by the Bagong Alyansang Makabayan (BAYAN), along with relatives of victims of reported extrajudicial killings under the Duterte administration, at the Welcome Rotonda in Quezon City to call for Duterte's imprisonment. Outside Metro Manila, BAYAN also organized political demonstrations in Baguio, Cebu City, and Iloilo City. Additionally, BAYAN led rallies, candlelight vigils, and prayers in The Hague, Hong Kong, New York City, Vancouver, and Washington, D.C.

Students from the Ateneo de Manila University, together with several groups including Akbayan, Mamamayang Liberal, and Tindig Pilipinas, held a rally and noise barrage along Katipunan Avenue in Quezon City on the afternoon of Duterte's arrest, expressing support for the ICC's action and demanding accountability and justice for victims of extrajudicial killings.

The trade union federation Sentro ng mga Nagkakaisa at Progresibong Manggagawa (SENTRO) led an anti-Duterte peace caravan in General Santos on March 16. The demonstration called for accountability, justice, and the protection of human rights for marginalized fisherfolk who suffered during Duterte's administration.

The progressive group Partido Lakas ng Masa also staged a demonstration at the Welcome Rotonda on March 19, urging the Marcos administration to decisively break from the Duterte administration's oppressive policies and human rights violations.

A mass in honor of victims of the drug war was celebrated at Cubao Cathedral in Quezon City by Program Paghilom, a human rights organization that supports victims' families.

== Reactions ==
=== Former Duterte administration officials and allies ===
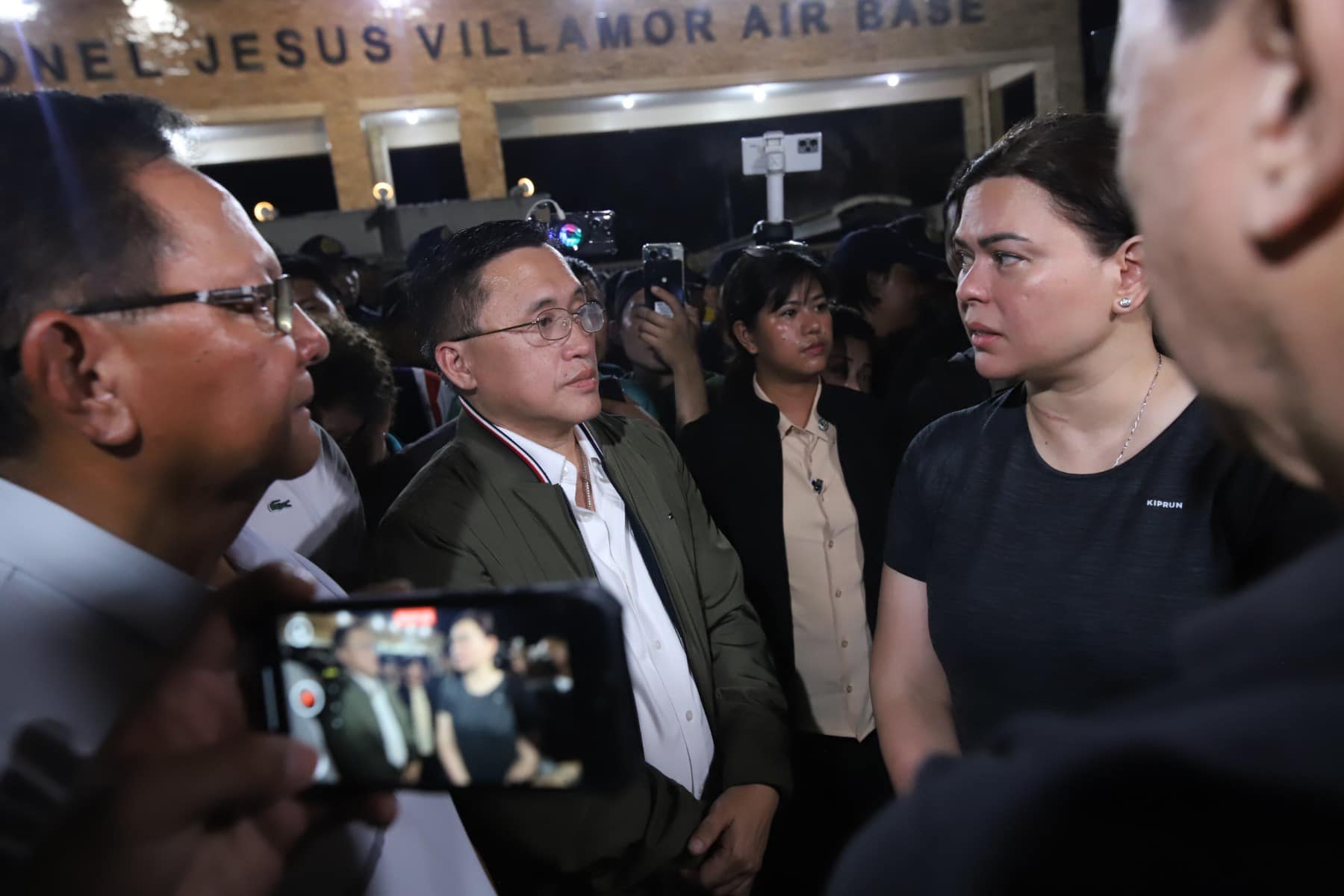
Senator Bong Go and Vice President Sara Duterte address the press outside Villamor Air Base, where Rodrigo Duterte was detained, on March 11, 2025.

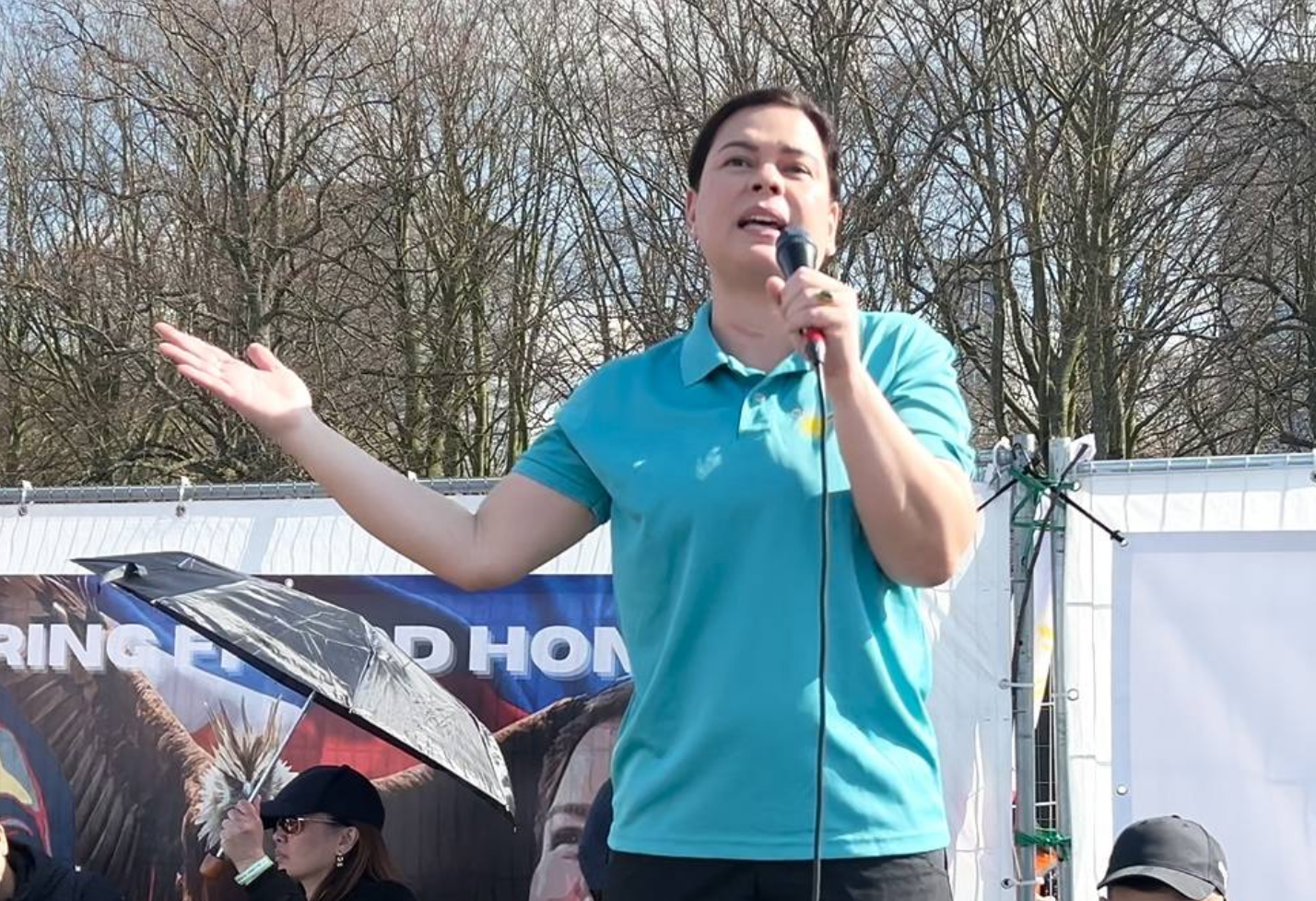
Vice President Sara Duterte addresses supporters in The Hague, Netherlands, on March 23, 2025.

Salvador Panelo, the former chief presidential legal counsel and presidential spokesperson of Rodrigo Duterte, lambasted Duterte's arrest as unlawful, stating that the Philippines was no longer a member of the ICC. The Supreme Court, to which he is answerable as an "officer of the court", had previously ruled that the country remained obliged to cooperate with the ICC regarding events leading up to its withdrawal.

Duterte's daughter, Philippine Vice President Sara Duterte, criticized the Philippine government while announcing that her father would be flown to the International Criminal Court. In her statement, she considered her father's detention to be "a blatant affront to our sovereignty and an insult to every Filipino who believes in our nation's independence". She labeled his arrest as "state kidnapping". While on a flight to the Netherlands on March 12, Vice President Duterte changed her profile pictures on Facebook and X to a digital red ribbon containing the text "BRING PRRD HOME 👊🏻".

Duterte's son and Davao City mayor Sebastian Duterte alleged on Facebook that his father was being denied medical care while in custody and that the government was trying to get him to board a plane without disclosing the destination. The Philippine government maintained that Duterte was in good condition.

On March 14, 2025, Sara Duterte publicly disclosed that she would not return to the Philippines for an unspecified period, stating that she would focus on forming her father's legal team. The next day, Sara stated that she would not return to her country until another family relative arrived in the Netherlands to accompany her father. On April 7, 2025, she returned to the Philippines.

Sebastian Duterte has alleged that search warrants have been issued for the residences of his father and other members of the Duterte family, which the PNP has denied. In a statement in the Netherlands on March 16, Sara Duterte stated that she expected evidence against her family to be planted during a police search.

Former presidential spokesperson Harry Roque, who is seeking recognition as legal counsel for Rodrigo Duterte at the ICC, reiterated Duterte's wish to be tried in the Philippines in a Facebook post. Roque stated that he anticipates receiving information regarding potential ICC arrest warrants against other individuals connected to Duterte's drug war, including Senator Ronald dela Rosa, who served as the chief of the Philippine National Police (PNP) from 2016 to 2018 during the peak of the drug war, and other former PNP chiefs. Roque, who has previously advised dela Rosa and other former PNP chiefs on ICC-related matters, highlighted the ICC's use of the term "co-perpetrator" in Duterte's warrant, suggesting that other high-ranking officials could also be identified as equally responsible for the alleged crimes.

=== Philippine government officials ===
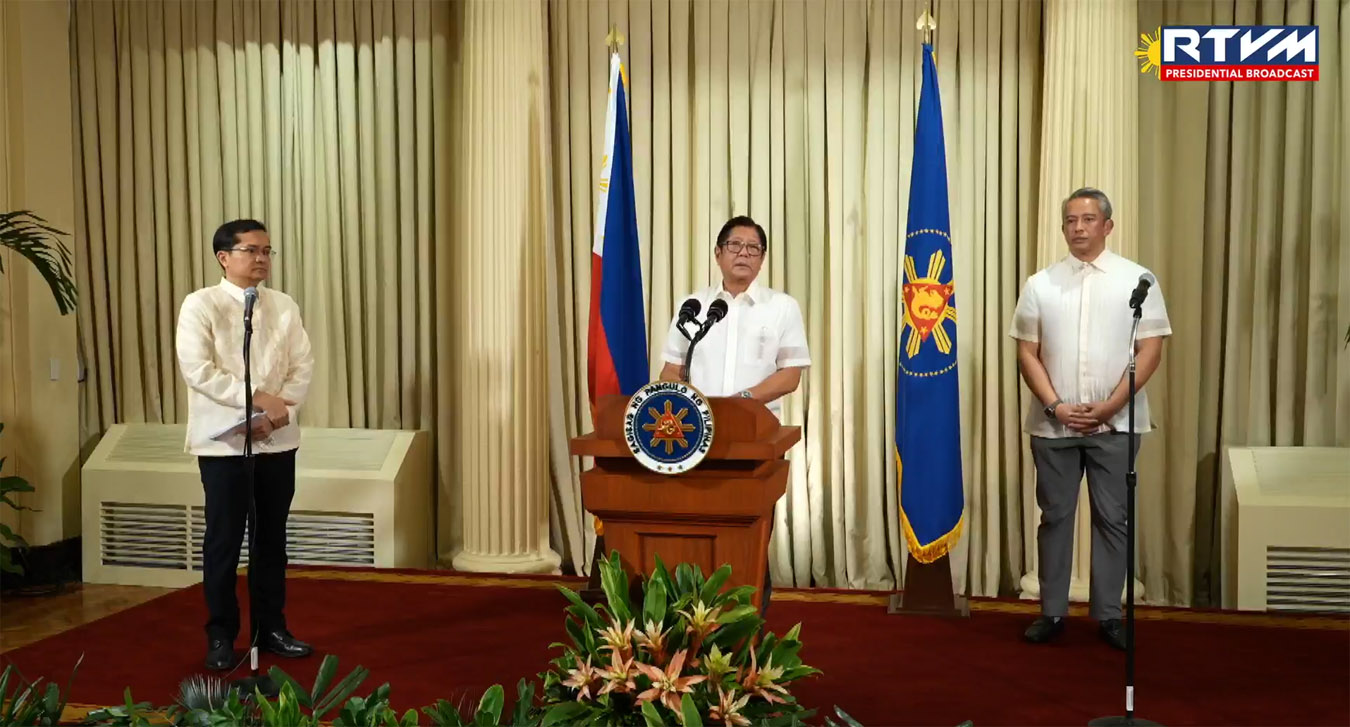
President Bongbong Marcos addresses the press minutes after Duterte's plane left for the Netherlands on March 11, 2025. Also participating in the press conference are Presidential Communications Office Secretary Jay Ruiz (left) and Interior Secretary Jonvic Remulla (right).

During a press conference held minutes after Duterte's plane departed for the Netherlands, President Bongbong Marcos denied allegations that Duterte's arrest was "political persecution", stating that the case had been initiated in 2017 while Duterte was president. In a later interview, Interior Secretary Jonvic Remulla recalled that President Marcos was calm but "melancholic" about Duterte's arrest, with Marcos privately telling him, "Nobody should be happy. There is no reason to celebrate."

Duterte's arrest drew mixed reactions from majority bloc members of the Senate. Senate President Francis Escudero urged due process from the ICC and called for restraint, warning against using Duterte's arrest for political gain ahead of the 2025 election. Senate President Pro Tempore Jinggoy Estrada emphasized national unity, urging Filipinos to remain calm and avoid misinformation or violence. He noted that Duterte, as a lawyer, knows the legal steps to take. Senator Imee Marcos, the incumbent president's sister, criticized the political divisions, saying Duterte's arrest only creates "chaos" and questioning whether it benefits ordinary Filipinos. She also expressed sympathy, noting his age. Senator Marcos, who is seeking re-election, skipped an Alyansa para sa Bagong Pilipinas campaign rally in Tacloban in protest of Duterte's arrest. On March 17, she directed the Senate Committee on Foreign Relations, which she chairs, to conduct an investigation into Duterte's arrest "to establish whether due process was followed". The committee invited police, airport, and Department of Foreign Affairs officials to the investigation, which began on March 20. At least three hearings were made.

Members of the House of Representatives' majority bloc, including party-list lawmakers, welcomed Duterte's arrest. Deputy Speaker and Pampanga 3rd District Representative Aurelio Gonzales Jr. stated that the ICC's action was based on evidence rather than politics, adding that Duterte could not evade justice indefinitely. House Deputy Majority Leader and La Union 1st District Representative Paolo Ortega described Duterte's arrest as a "significant step" toward delivering long-awaited justice to the victims of extrajudicial killings, urging Duterte to face his criminal charges instead of portraying himself as a victim. Ortega, along with Batangas 2nd District Representative Gerville Luistro and Bataan 1st District Representative Geraldine Roman, suggested that the Philippines reconsider rejoining the ICC. Luistro argued that the ICC serves as a "court of last resort" if the Supreme Court cannot efficiently and effectively handle controversial issues and cases. Roman believed that the Marcos administration's commitment to upholding the rule of law means there is no reason to fear rejoining the ICC.

House Assistant Majority Leaders Jude Acidre of Tingog Party List and Zia Alonto Adiong of Lanao del Sur's 1st District also welcomed Duterte's arrest. Acidre responded to critics by asserting that Duterte's arrest under an ICC warrant does not compromise national sovereignty but rather seeks justice for the victims of extrajudicial killings. Adiong noted the irony that Duterte, who had previously mocked human rights and legal proceedings, is now receiving full legal protections under international justice mechanisms.

Surigao del Norte 2nd District Representative Ace Barbers, who chairs the Quad Committee, described Duterte's arrest as a "pivotal" step toward justice and a turning point for the aggressive tactics employed by police in the Duterte administration's war against drugs. Barbers revealed that the Quad Committee's investigation uncovered allegations that police officers were financially incentivized to kill drug suspects, encouraging them to maximize such actions.

Taguig 2nd District Representative Pammy Zamora, Zambales 1st District Representative Jay Khonghun, and Ako Bicol Representative Raul Angelo Bongalon declared Duterte's arrest a "victory for justice and accountability", emphasizing that the ICC warrant demonstrates that no one is above the law.

The Philippine Commission on Human Rights stated that it was willing to cooperate with the ICC. It also said that persons who participated or were complicit in the human rights violations must be held accountable.

=== Philippine opposition ===
Former senator Leila de Lima, who was previously imprisoned and later acquitted of drug charges by the Duterte administration, welcomed Duterte's arrest. She also stated that "Duterte now has to answer for his actions, not in the court of public opinion but before the rule of law". During a press conference in Naga on March 16, de Lima appeared alongside former vice president Leni Robredo, who compared Duterte's situation with de Lima's seven-year imprisonment over what Robredo described as "trumped-up" charges. Robredo noted that Duterte's detention conditions were significantly better compared to de Lima's previous imprisonment.

Former senator Antonio Trillanes, who filed a criminal complaint against Duterte at the ICC in 2017, described Duterte's arrest as "the first step toward achieving justice for the thousands who were killed" and called on Duterte to "purify his soul".

Senate Deputy Minority Leader Risa Hontiveros stated that Duterte's arrest marked the day that families of thousands of victims killed during Duterte's drug war had long awaited. Hontiveros urged the government not to stop with Duterte but to pursue accountability for all involved. She reminded Duterte of his previous oath to face the legal process under the ICC.

Members of the House of Representatives' minority bloc, including party-list lawmakers, also lauded Duterte's arrest. GABRIELA Representative Arlene Brosas called it "a glimpse of hope" for the victims' families, while House Minority Leader France Castro of ACT Teachers described it as "a concrete step towards accountability and justice" for victims of human rights abuses. Kabataan Representative Raoul Manuel remarked the arrest as "long overdue and well-deserved". Manuel pointed out that Duterte should be thankful for being calmly apprehended, unlike those who were executed without due process during his war on drugs. Akbayan Representative Perci Cendaña declared that Duterte's "day of reckoning has come."

Former Akbayan representative Walden Bello of the Partido Lakas ng Masa described Duterte's arrest as a "monumental step" in providing justice to the victims of extrajudicial killings. Bello added that Duterte's arrest is the result of a rigorous legal process that offers the former president a fair trial, something Duterte's victims did not receive. Meanwhile, Bello's fellow party member and labor leader Luke Espiritu expressed strong support for Duterte's arrest, accusing the former president of severely damaging the nation's values and character, and calling the arrest "just".

=== Human rights advocates ===
The arrest was positively received by the surviving family members of drug war victims. Neri Colmenares, who serves as counsel for the victims, noted that the arrest is a welcome development that "sends a powerful message" and is an important step toward justice for the victims. Kristina Conti, who serves as an assistant to counsel at the ICC, expressed hope that Duterte's arrest would lead to a trial.

Lawyer Chel Diokno of the Free Legal Assistance Group (FLAG) stated: "For decades, Duterte thought himself untouchable. But history catches up with even the most ruthless despots". According to Diokno, an official government report recorded 20,322 drug-related deaths, of which 3,967 were attributed to law enforcement operations, while the remaining 16,355 were classified as vigilante killings.

Agnès Callamard, Secretary General of Amnesty International, called Duterte's arrest "a monumental step for justice". Callamard previously served as Special Rapporteur on extrajudicial, summary, or arbitrary executions under the United Nations Human Rights Council, which included conducting investigations in the Philippines. She was barred from visiting the country during Duterte's presidency.

The International Coalition for Human Rights in the Philippines described the arrest as a "resounding message that crimes against humanity will not go unpunished". Human Rights Watch said that "Former President Duterte's arrest and transfer to The Hague is a long-overdue victory against impunity that could bring victims and their families a step closer to justice."

=== Religious community ===
In a press statement, the Catholic Bishops' Conference of the Philippines described Duterte's arrest as "a crucial step toward accountability", stating it "sets an important precedent for addressing past and future human rights violations in the Philippines". In contrast, the Archbishop of Davao, Romulo Valles, said "Justice…must be pursued with fairness and integrity. It must remain free from partisan political motivations or personal vendettas", and offered prayers for Duterte and his family while reiterating calls for accountability. The Iglesia ni Cristo criticized Duterte's arrest and said he should have been tried in the Philippines. It also accused the Marcos administration of "politicking" and failing to listen to the group's calls for "peace, unity, and the need to first address the problems of our country and our countrymen".

=== International ===
- China – On March 11, Foreign Ministry spokesperson Mao Ning stated that the ICC "should strictly follow the principle of complementarity, exercise its functions and powers prudently in accordance with the law and prevent politicization or double standards". On March 24, Chinese foreign ministry spokesperson Guo Jiakun said that China did not receive an application for asylum from Duterte or his family.
- Malaysia – Former prime minister Mahathir Mohamad criticized the International Criminal Court (ICC) for alleged double standards in its handling of Duterte’s case. He questioned why the ICC acted against Duterte while seemingly not taking similar action against Israeli Prime Minister Benjamin Netanyahu. Mahathir stated, "International law is only applicable when the person is not powerful enough to resist or deny the right of the ICC."
- United Nations – At a press conference, UN High Commissioner for Human Rights spokesperson Ravina Shamdasani stated that they have "long documented the severe human rights impacts of the so-called war on drugs in the Philippines". UN High Commissioner for Human Rights Volker Türk welcomed the arrest, saying that the "extremely serious charges against [Duterte] will now be addressed fairly and independently, in full accordance with the law".

== Aftermath ==
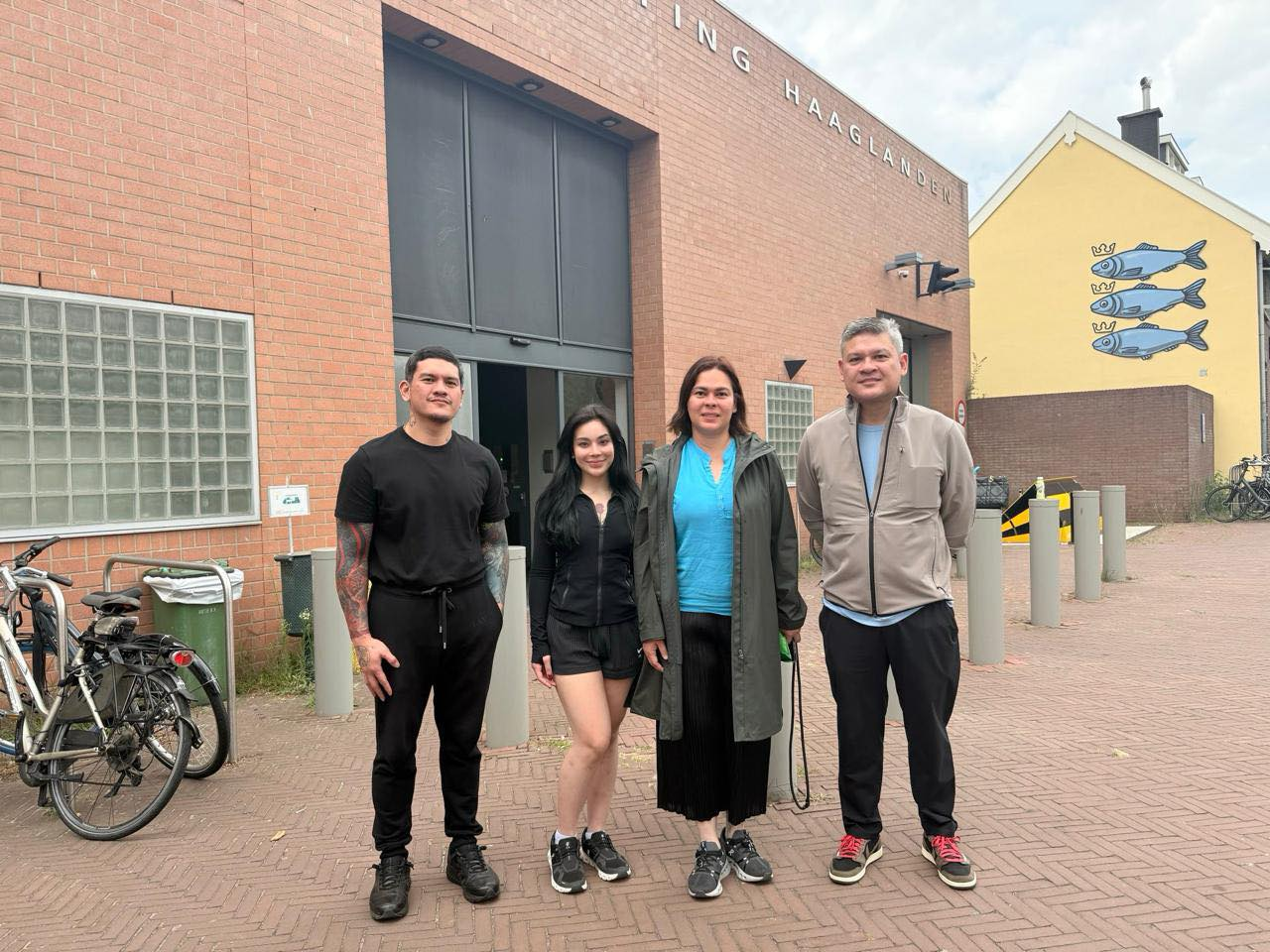
Duterte siblings during their visit of former President Rodrigo Duterte on August 27, 2025

Vice President Sara Duterte speech on first anniversary of the arrest of former President Rodrigo Duterte

=== Start of ICC court hearings ===
Duterte appeared via videolink before the ICC for the first time on March 14, during which he was informed of the charges against him. He is set to be arraigned in The Hague on charges of crimes against humanity at the ICC and will remain in custody at the ICC section of the United Nations Detention Unit while awaiting trial. The confirmation of charges was scheduled for September 23, 2025. but was postponed indefinitely by the ICC judges on September 8, 2025, to permit further testing to determine whether Duterte was fit to stand trial. On March 18, Vice President Sara Duterte, who traveled to the Netherlands, announced that Medialdea and former presidential spokesperson Harry Roque would no longer be part of her father's ICC defense team. The team will instead be led by British-Israeli lawyer Nicholas Kaufman, who has extensive ICC experience. Medialdea previously appeared before the ICC Pre-Trial Chamber during Duterte's initial hearing, while Roque was not formally nominated to the team.

The indictment against Duterte, which was made public on September 22, 2025, accused him of involvement in the murders of 76 people between 2013 and 2018. Fifty-seven of the killings took place during his presidency, and the other 19 occurred during his term as mayor of Davao City.

Duterte's confirmation of charges hearing was held between February 23 and 27, 2026.

On May 8, 2026, Duterte's main defense lawyer Nicholas Kaufman requested the ICC to remove him as Duterte's lawyer.

=== Possible future arrests ===
The Philippine government states it will serve future warrants for the ICC if such are conveyed through Interpol.

The ICC mentions nine other co-perpetrators of Rodrigo Duterte whose names are redacted in a document. Harry Roque mentioned that former police chief Ronald dela Rosa could be among them along with four other police heads.

Following the Duterte's arrest, Dela Rosa declared he is willing to join Duterte in The Hague if all legal remedies are exhausted. However, Dela Rosa was at an undisclosed location within the Philippines during and after the arrest and considered hiding from authorities. Later, upon receiving word of a possible ICC arrest warrant from the November 8, 2025 radio interview of Ombudsman Jesus Crispin Remulla, Dela Rosa went into hiding for six months and consequently became absent for 31 Senate sessions.

Upon the official disclosure of the arrest warrant in May 2026, Dela Rosa evaded attempts by authorities to arrest him during his return to the Senate, leading to a three-day standoff that resulted in unprecedented violence at the institution coming the gunfire instigated by Senate Sergeant-at-Arms Mao Aplasca, a Dela Rosa ally. Dela Rosa escaped from the Senate premises in the early hours of May 14 through the assistance of Senator Robin Padilla and his deputy chief of staff Jean Alia Robles and headed to Makati.

== Online propaganda ==
Soon after Duterte's arrest, online propaganda emerged depicting Duterte as a victim or attacking drug war victims' families. The ICC and its judges were subjected to online attacks, while coordinated disinformation questioned the ICC's jurisdiction and the legality of the arrest. Other types of false information and flawed arguments were also widely shared.

Within 12 hours of the arrest, 200 Facebook pages and accounts posted identical texts that accused police of kidnapping Duterte, even before Duterte lawyers made similar claims. Similar posts were shared on pro-Duterte Facebook pages, as well as on entertainment fan pages.

== See also ==
- Attempts to arrest Ronald dela Rosa – Attempts to arrest the Philippine senator
- Arrest of Apollo Quiboloy – 2024 standoff in Davao City, Philippines
- First impeachment of Sara Duterte – 2025 Philippine charging of vice president
- Second impeachment of Sara Duterte – 2026 Philippine political event
- Arrest of Jair Bolsonaro – 2025 house arrest of President of Brazil
