= Honeylet Avanceña =

Domestic partner of Philippine president Rodrigo Duterte (born 1970)

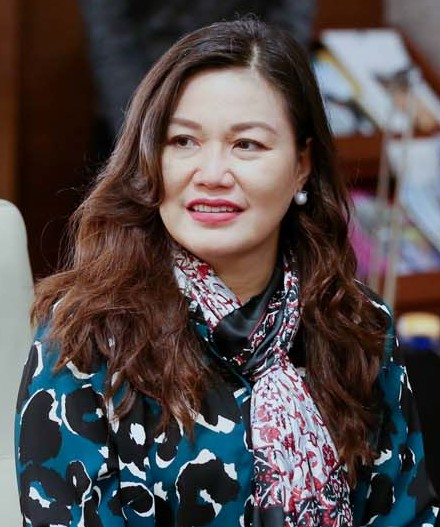
- Avaceña in 2019
- Born: Cielito Salvador Avaceña; February 17, 1970 (age 56); Davao City, Philippines
- Education: Davao Doctors' College (BS)
- Occupations: Businesswoman, former nurse
- Known for: Domestic partner of the president of the Philippines
- Partner: Rodrigo Duterte (c. 1996–present)
- Children: Kitty Duterte

Cielito "Honeylet" Salvador Avanceña (born February 17, 1970) is a Filipino businesswoman and former nurse who is the domestic partner of Rodrigo Duterte, the 16th President of the Philippines (in office from 2016 to 2022). Avanceña and Duterte have been in a relationship since as early as 1996 and have a daughter together. Although she was de facto spouse of the president of the Philippines, she was not designated as First Lady during Duterte's presidency. Nonetheless, she served the duties of First Lady during state banquets.

== Biography ==
Avanceña first met Rodrigo Duterte shortly after she participated in the 1988 Mutya ng Dabaw pageant where she finished as first runner-up. Avanceña worked as a nurse in the United States beginning in 2000, returning to Davao shortly after her daughter Veronica ("Kitty") was born in the United States in April 2004.

She joined her partner's presidential campaign in Luzon during the run-up to the 2016 elections.

Prior to Duterte's presidency, Avanceña ran several businesses in Davao: a meat shop, a canteen catering service, and 11 Mister Donut franchises.

=== Role in Duterte's presidency ===
Shortly after the inauguration of her partner as president, Avanceña was not named as First Lady. Her stepdaughter Sara was proposed to fulfill the role instead but declined the offer.

Avanceña nevertheless fulfilled roles usually conducted by the First Lady, notably during the official visit of Japanese prime minister Shinzo Abe and the 30th ASEAN Summit in 2017.

=== Post-Malacañang activities ===
On March 11, 2025, Duterte was arrested by the Philippine National Police in coordination with Interpol and based on a warrant issued by the International Criminal Court (ICC). During the arrest, Avanceña tried to persuade Duterte to not comply with police authorities due to her belief that they had no official warrant for him. While Duterte was being held in custody at the Villamor Air Base in Pasay, an attempt by the police to block her daughter Kitty from reaching Duterte's room led to Avanceña hitting a SAF officer on the head with her smartphone, allegedly in response to being separated from her daughter. The SAF officer was later hospitalized but soon recovered. The phone-striking incident by Avanceña has since been cited by ICC deputy prosecutor Mame Mandiaye Niang as among the reasons for why the detained Duterte should not be granted interim release by the ICC to the country of his choice as it "risk[s] bringing real and substantial harm to the legitimate interests of victims and witnesses" in Duterte's case.

== Personal life ==
Avanceña became a partner of Duterte, then-married to Elizabeth Zimmerman, in the late 1990s. With Duterte's infidelity, Zimmerman filed for an annulment before a regional trial court in Pasig in 1998, which was granted two years later.

Despite Avanceña being the common-law wife of Duterte since 2000, Duterte has admitted during his 2016 presidential campaign to having multiple girlfriends such as a cosmetics worker in a shopping mall and a cashier. Others cited to have been among Duterte's partners during his relationship with Avanceña include Agusan del Norte governor Angelica Amante, former news reporter Girlie Balaba, and presidential protocol director Jasmin Egan, while a rumor involving his alleged relationship with agriculture undersecretary Bernadette Romulo-Puyat was denied by Duterte. Avanceña previously denied Duterte's affairs in 2016, stating that she would have ended their relationship if they were true.

After Duterte assumed the presidency, Avanceña admitted to making uncomfortable adjustments to a more public life, with her expressing displeasure in having bodyguards for her and her daughter Kitty, stating that "I'm embarrassed in front of Davaoeños when they see so much security. We aren't used to it."
