= Elizabeth Zimmerman =

Rodrigo Duterte's ex-wife (born 1948)

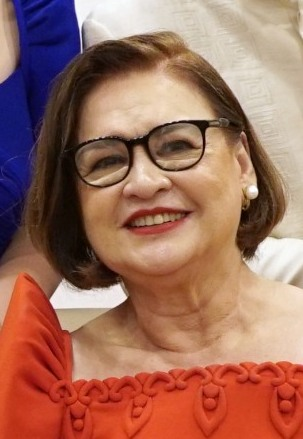
- Zimmerman in 2018
- Born: Elizabeth Abellana Zimmerman; April 14, 1948 (age 78); Davao City, Philippines
- Education: Ateneo de Davao University
- Occupation: Flight attendant (formerly)
- Political party: Independent (2001)
- Spouse: Rodrigo Duterte (m. 1973; ann. 2000)
- Children: Paolo; Sara; Sebastian

Elizabeth Abellana Zimmerman (born April 14, 1948) is the former wife of Rodrigo Duterte, the 16th President of the Philippines, and the mother of Vice President Sara Duterte, Davao City representative Paolo Duterte, and Davao City mayor Sebastian Duterte.

== Early life ==
Zimmerman was born on April 14, 1948 in Davao City. Her birth certificate erroneously cites August 14 as her birthdate, resulting from a mistake in the late registration of her birth. Her parents are Godofredo Zimmerman from Hilongos, Leyte and Purisima Abellana from Tuburan, Cebu. After finishing her college degree at the Ateneo de Davao, she subsequently worked as a flight stewardess for Philippine Airlines. She subsequently held a teaching job at the Philippine Women's College upon her marriage to Duterte.

=== Alleged Jewish descent ===
On September 30, 2016, Rodrigo Duterte said "Hitler massacred three million Jews... there's three million drug addicts. I'd be happy to slaughter them." His comments drew widespread outrage and condemnation from the global Jewish community. Duterte later claimed that the Zimmerman family is of patrilineal Jewish descent, with her father having fled to the Philippines from Nazi Germany. On October 3, 2016, during Rosh Hashanah, Duterte said "[..] my wife is a Zimmerman. She is a descendant of an American Jew. [..] So why would I defile the memory of the Jews? What would I get if I insult the Jewish people [..]"

In a statement on June 27, 2023, six years after both remarks were made, then-Press Secretary Trixie Cruz-Angeles reiterated that the claims that the Zimmermans were Jewish are false, saying "[t]he Zimmermans arrived in the PH in the 1930s and were not refugees during WW2. They are not European Jews, but came from the US." On June 28, 2023, historian Todd Sales Lucero (a columnist from The Freeman, a Cebu newspaper), wrote that Zimmerman's great-grandfather was an non-Jewish German Lutheran from Unterlangau, Bavaria who immigrated to Illinois. DNA testing of the Zimmermans has not indicated any Jewish descent.

== Politics ==
Zimmerman ran for councilor of Davao City in 2001 but lost. She joined the Biyaheng DU30 bus caravan which went around the Visayas and Mindanao, in support of her former husband's presidential bid in 2016.

In March 2019, Zimmerman scolded her daughter, Davao City mayor Sara Duterte, for "bullying" senatorial candidates under the Otso Diretso opposition slate, telling her that "Everyone knows you are a child of Rodrigo, but they should also know that you are a child of Elizabeth."

== Personal life ==
In 1973, Zimmerman married future Davao City mayor and Philippine president Rodrigo Duterte, who was then a new lawyer. The couple has three children, namely Paolo ("Pulong"), Sara ("Inday Sara") and Sebastian ("Baste").

Zimmerman separated from Duterte in 1998 after she caught him in adultery. She filed for a civil annulment and lived with her brother in Metro Manila for a few months, occasionally visiting Davao City since her children were still studying there. Duterte did not contest the annulment, which was granted by a Pasig court in 2000. After the annulment, Zimmerman maintained a close friendship with her former husband, while Sara stayed with her. She chose to continue using "Duterte" as her surname despite the annulment, saying that her church marriage with Duterte has never been declared null by the Catholic Church. She has eleven grandchildren: five from Paolo, three from Sara, and three from Baste. She also has two great-grandchildren.

In August 2015, Zimmerman was diagnosed with stage 3 breast cancer, but was declared fully recovered in October 2016. Her recovery then led to her becoming a breast cancer advocate.

After Rodrigo Duterte's arrest on March 11, 2025, her daughter Vice President Sara claimed that her mother told her to prepare for the possibility that she will be arrested next. By late March, Zimmerman arrived at The Hague, Netherlands, where Duterte is currently being detained.

== Ancestry ==
Ancestors of Elizabeth Zimmerman

8. Michael August Zimmerman
4. George John Zimmerman
9. Maria Wenzel
2. Godofredo Zimmerman
10. Alcantara Baldazo
5. Cristeta Baldazo
11. Regina Verdadera
1. Elizabeth Zimmerman
12. Félix Abellana
6. Gaspar Abellana
13. Dalmacia Rondina
3. Purisima Abellana
14. Bonifacio Fortunado
7. Julia Fortunado
15. Romana Pajaganas
