= Kitty Duterte =

Youngest daughter of Rodrigo Duterte (born 2004)

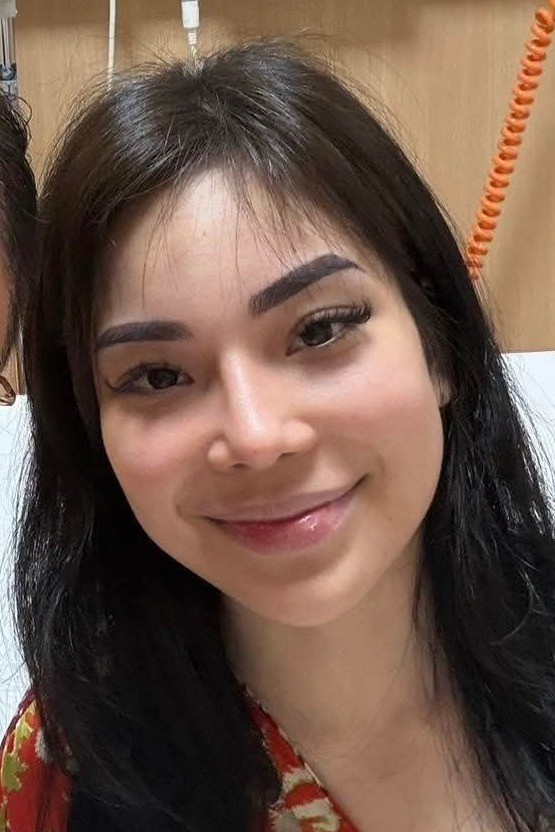
- Duterte in 2026
- Born: Veronica Avanceña Duterte; April 10, 2004 (age 22); San Diego, California, U.S.
- Citizenship: United States; Philippines
- Education: Stella Maris Academy of Davao
- Known for: Youngest daughter of Rodrigo Duterte, 16th president of the Philippines
- Political party: HTL (since 2025)
- Parents: Rodrigo Duterte (father); Honeylet Avanceña (mother)
- Relatives: Paolo Duterte (half-brother); Sara Duterte (half-sister); Sebastian Duterte (half-brother)
- Family: Duterte

Instagram information
- Page: vee
- Years active: 2016-present
- Followers: 1.9 million
- Last updated: November 11, 2026

Veronica "Kitty" Avanceña Duterte (Note: Although Kitty Duterte was born in the United States, her official documents possess her mother's maiden name which is Avanceña.) (born April 10, 2004) is a Filipino personality who is the youngest daughter of former Philippine president Rodrigo Duterte and his partner Cielito "Honeylet" Avanceña. She became a recognizable figure on social media during her father's presidency and has occasionally drawn media attention for her outspoken remarks and activities.

At a young age, Duterte has been involved in various controversies. The Anti–Money Laundering Council (AMLC) has confirmed that she received P53.28 million in drug money, jointly with her mother, from Chinese drug lord Sammy Uy, who was the economic adviser of her father. She has been criticized for using drug money in her rhinoplasty, jawtox, lip fillers and other face and body procedures which she claims she gets 'weekly'. Photo evidences where she captioned 'wake and bake' also confirmed that she is a user of marijuana, an illegal drug in Philippine law. On March 2025, she attempted to obstruct her father's arrest. Her father was successfully arrested for crimes against humanity by the International Criminal Court.

== Early life and education ==
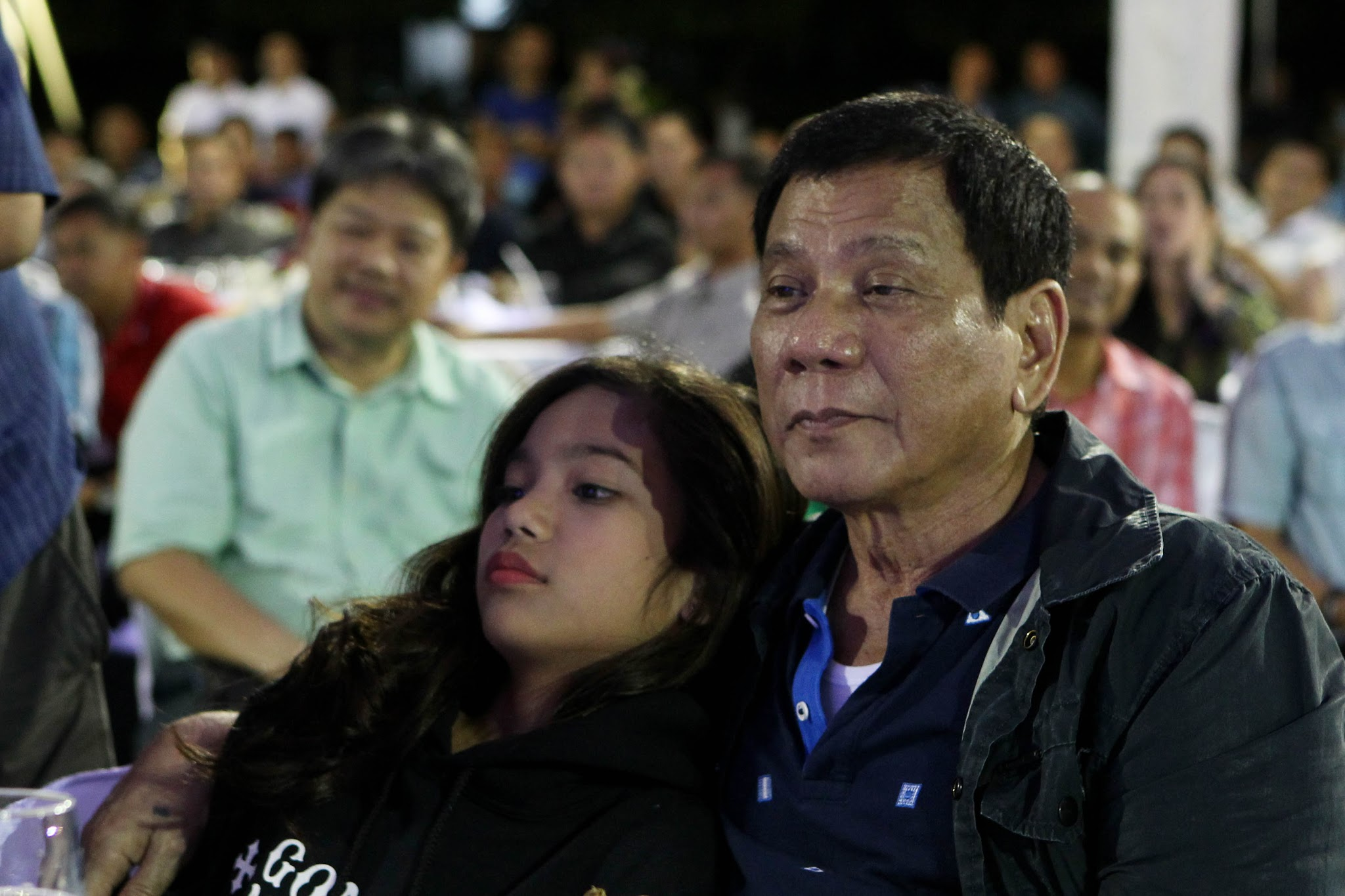
Duterte with her father, Rodrigo Duterte

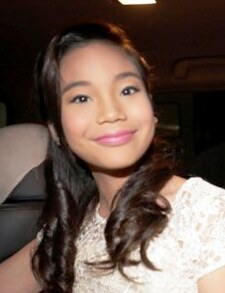
Duterte in 2016

Veronica Avanceña Duterte was born in San Diego, United States, on April 10, 2004, to then-Davao City mayor Rodrigo Duterte and then-nurse Cielito "Honeylet" Avanceña. Rodrigo himself had not visited the country since 2000, having expressed disdain for the country since the Evergreen Hotel explosion in Davao City in 2002. Avanceña, who had been working in the U.S., returned to the Philippines with Kitty shortly after the latter's birth.

Duterte studied at Stella Maris Academy in Davao City.

== Political involvement ==
=== Incident during Rodrigo Duterte's arrest ===
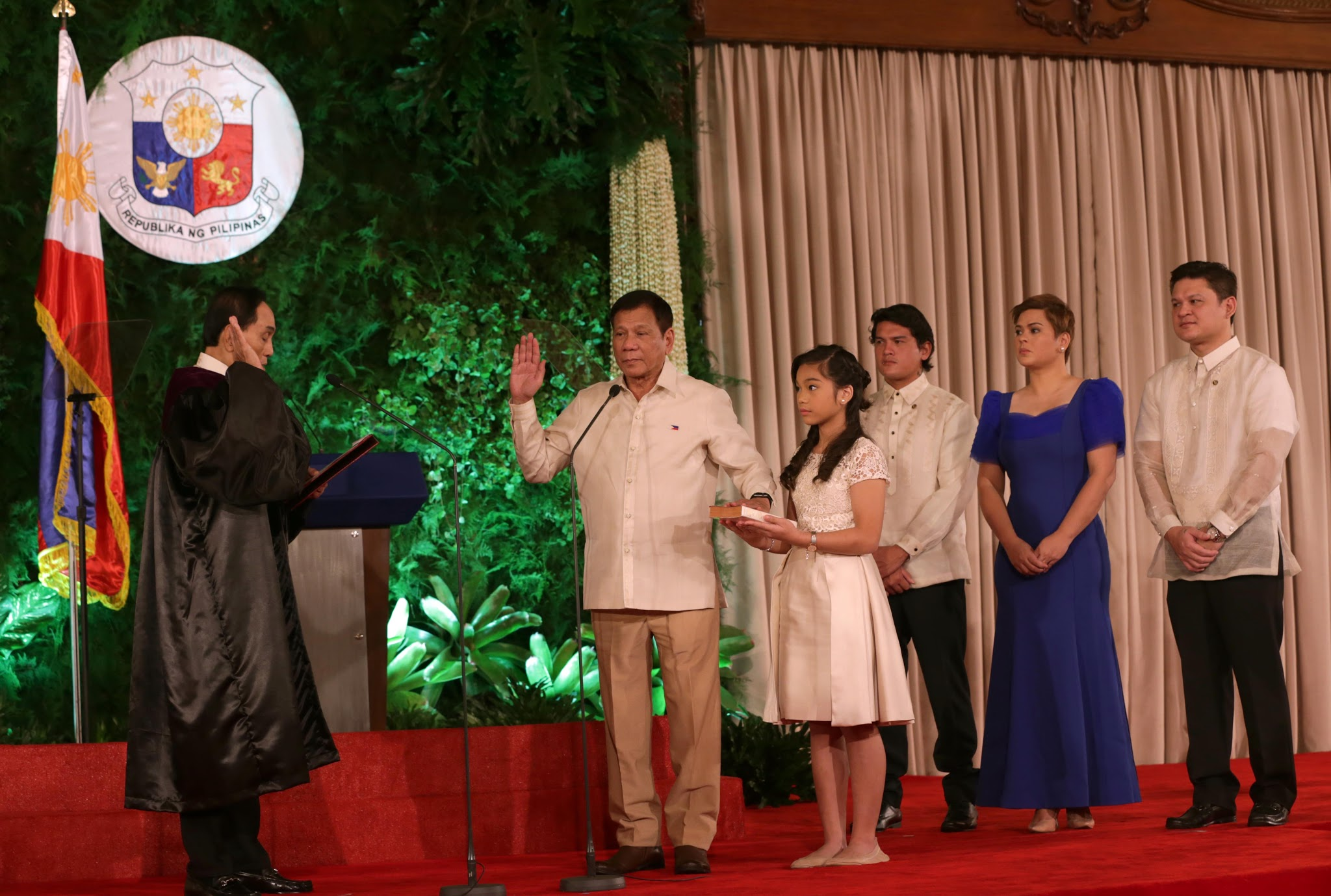
Rodrigo Duterte takes oath as the 16th President of the Philippines. Kitty Duterte is on the right of her father, holding the Bible

On March 11, 2025, during the arrest of her father, former president Rodrigo Duterte, Kitty Duterte was heard cursing at then-Criminal Investigation and Detection Group (CIDG) Director General and former Chief of the Philippine National Police Nicolas Torre in a video she posted on her Instagram account. Torre, who was explaining flight arrangements for Duterte, said he did not take offense at Kitty’s remarks, noting that he "had seen worse" and understood the heightened emotions of the situation.

In April 2025, Duterte, along with her half-brothers Paolo and Sebastian, filed a petition before the Supreme Court of the Philippines seeking the return of their father from detention in The Hague under the custody of the International Criminal Court (ICC). She requested that the High Court hold oral arguments on the habeas corpus petition, arguing that the judiciary had a role in safeguarding constitutional rights in relation to foreign detention.

In May 2025, Honeylet confirmed that Rodrigo had urged Duterte to both continue her schooling and follow his career path after Kitty had expressed her reluctance to enter politics. Duterte campaigned for several of Rodrigo's endorsed candidates for senator in the 2025 election, citing her father's arrest as the reason for her active campaigning.

In August 2025, Duterte confirmed that her father had undergone a checkup and is in stable condition, and also she and along with her three siblings visited their father in The Hague. She later revealed in March that she and her siblings were unable to watch the confirmation of charges against their father due to distress.

=== Political affiliation and support ===
Duterte is a member of the local party her father founded, the Hugpong sa Tawong Lungsod (HTL). Duterte also supported her half-sister vice president Sara's 2028 presidential bid. On September 9, 2026, she sent a video message to the Club Filipino launch of the Inday Sara Na Movement Philippines (ISMP) established by former RP2 broadcaster Daniel Nobleza Salasalan, which came in the aftermath of Sara's arrest warrant and bail: "Those who accountable must be held accountable. No one will be left behind. We will return in 2028."

== Personal life ==
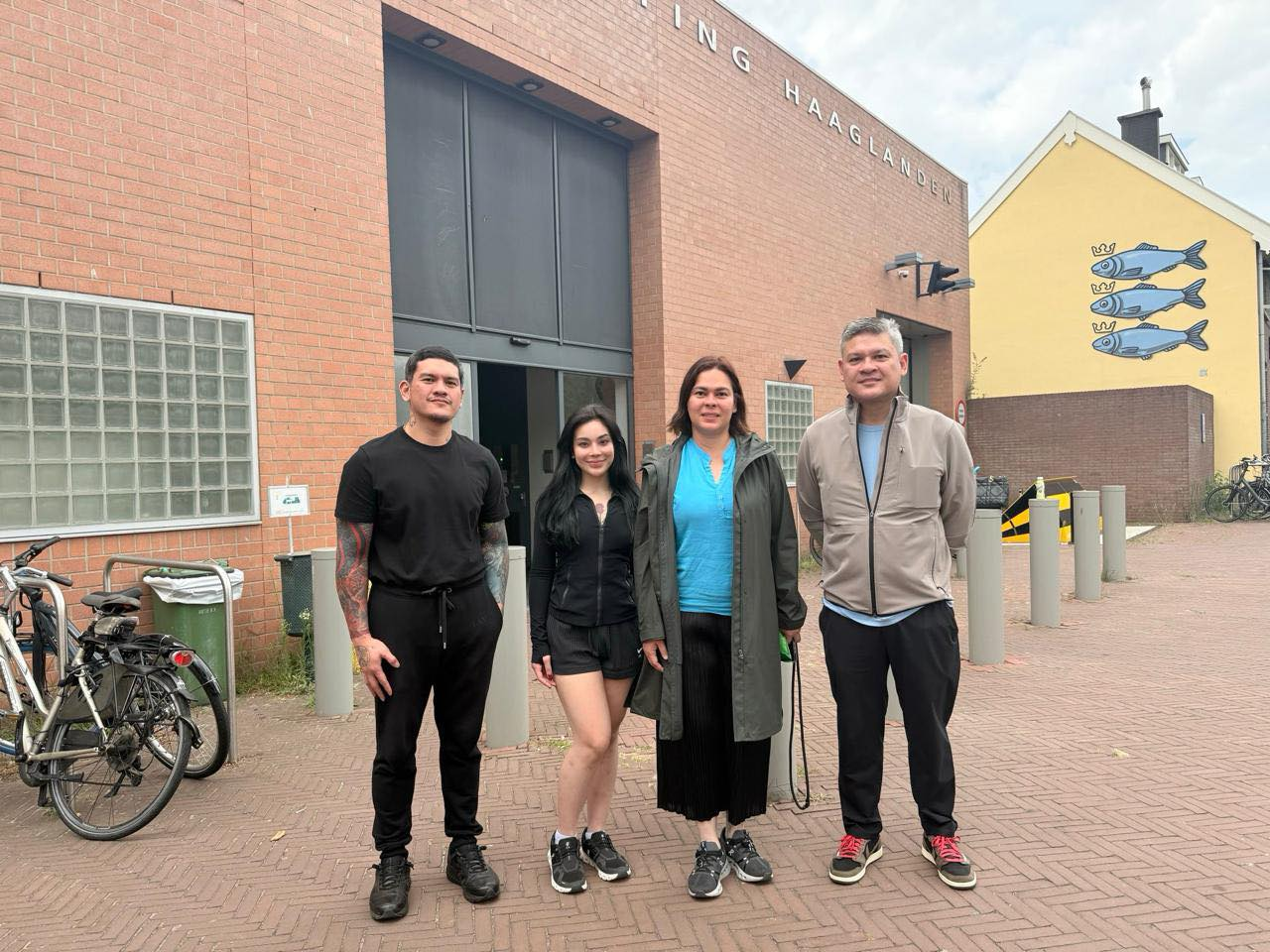
Kitty Duterte (second to the left) and her paternal half-siblings during their visit to former President Rodrigo Duterte in The Hague on August 27, 2025

Duterte has cited her mother as a major influence and has expressed interest in pursuing careers in business or law. She had various expensive facial surgeries when she was 19, including rhinoplasty, jawtox, and lip fillers, and has admitted that she 'also gets weekly procedures'. Many have criticized her, not for having surgeries, but for using using drug money for the procedures, after it was revealed and confirmed by the Anti–Money Laundering Council (AMLC) that she was among the people who received drug money from Chinese drug lord Sammy Uy, who was appointed by her father Rodrigo Duterte as state economic adviser before. Kitty Duterte received at least P53.28 million in drug money, jointly with her mother, as confirmed by verified bank transactions.

She is also known to be a fan of international pop singers such as Selena Gomez and Ariana Grande. In November 2023, One News reported that Duterte was in a relationship with De La Salle Green Archers guard Evan Nelle. Speculation about the couple's relationship began prior to the start of the UAAP Season 86 men's basketball tournament, and Duterte was later seen attending La Salle games in support of Nelle. By May 2024, Duterte and Nelle had unfollowed each other's Instagram accounts.

Beginning in 2022, a child named Mira ("Mimi", born 2019) is seen being raised by Duterte's parents. It was later revealed that Mira is the daughter of Duterte's half-nephew, Omar Duterte, with his Japanese former girlfriend. Duterte attributes her tattoo of a rose on her chest to Mira.

A week after her father's arrest in March 2025, several of her private Instagram posts involving her alleged use of marijuana were leaked to the public, with the associated phrase "wake and bake" becoming viral.

Duterte was later confirmed to in a relationship with Vic Singson, the grandson of Chavit Singson and a member of the Ilocos Sur Provincial Board in his capacity as the president of the province's Sangguniang Kabataan Federation. Duterte celebrated her 22nd birthday in a hospital and she was visited by Senator Bong Go.

=== Citizenship ===
Duterte is a dual American and Filipino citizen, having been born in the United States to Filipino parents. In April 2025, she was seen holding a United States passport while outside the Scheveningen penitentiary in The Hague, where her father, former president Rodrigo Duterte, was detained. Responding to criticism online, Duterte maintained that she was a private citizen and did not need to explain her citizenship status, emphasizing that she was also a Filipino citizen.

=== Drug money and drug use ===
The Anti–Money Laundering Council (AMLC) has confirmed that Chinese drug lord Sammy Uy, who was appointed by former president Rodrigo Duterte as his economic adviser, gave a minimum of P181.6 million in payments via cashier’s and personal checks to various members of the Duterte family from 2011 to 2013 alone. Five transactions, amounting to P53.28 million, were deposited into a joint account under Kitty Duterte and her mother Honeylet Avanceña.

Photo evidences and screenshots from Duterte's own private social media were exposed in 2025, showing Kitty Duterte was using marijuana, an illegal drug in Philippine law. Duterte inputted the caption herself, writing 'wake and bake'.
