= Rodrigo Duterte =

President of the Philippines from 2016 to 2022

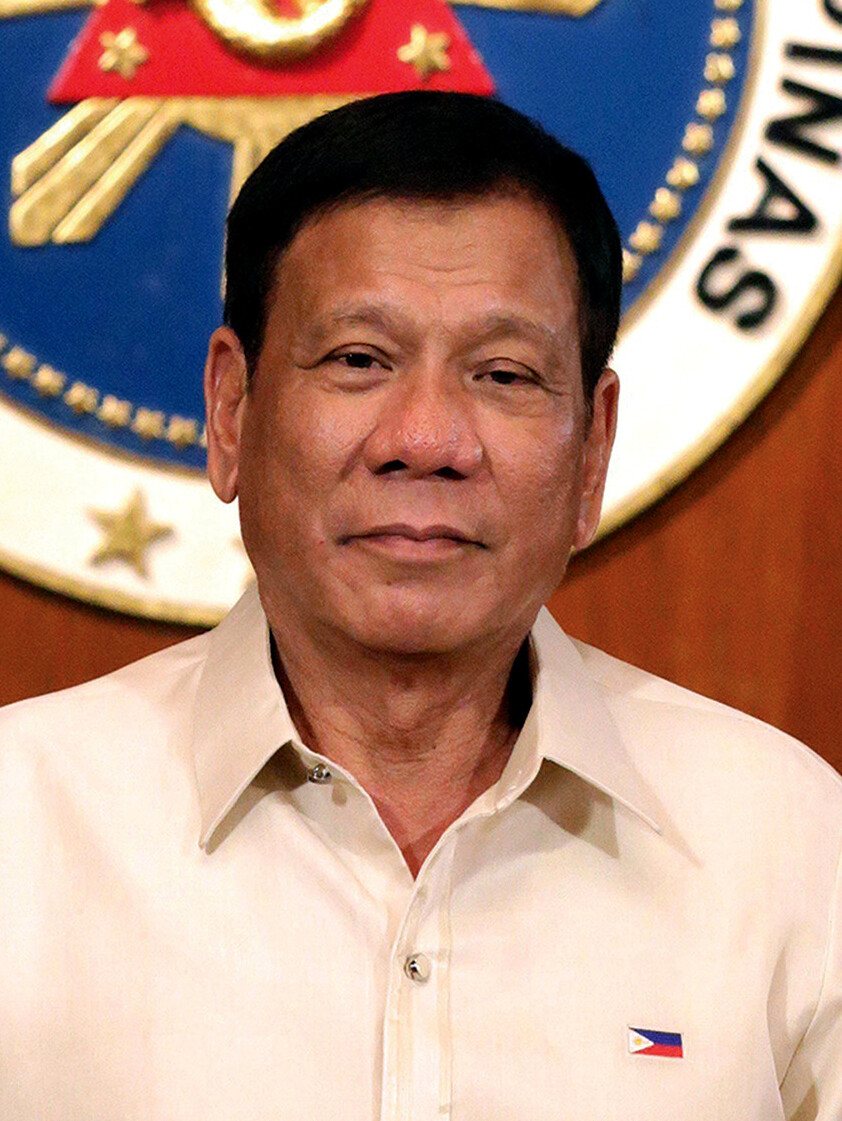
- Official portrait, 2016

16th President of the Philippines
- In office June 30, 2016 – June 30, 2022
- Vice President: Leni Robredo
- Preceded by: Benigno Aquino III
- Succeeded by: Bongbong Marcos

18th Mayor of Davao City (Note: Duterte was elected Mayor of Davao City for a term that would begin on June 30, 2025. However, he was unable to assume office as his detention in The Hague prevented him from taking the oath of office within the prescribed six-month period. Consequently, Sebastian Duterte served as Acting Mayor from June 30, 2025, until he permanently assumed the office on January 23, 2026.)
- In office June 30, 2013 – June 30, 2016
- Vice Mayor: Paolo Duterte
- Preceded by: Sara Duterte
- Succeeded by: Sara Duterte
- In office June 30, 2001 – June 30, 2010
- Vice Mayor: Luis Bonguyan (2001–2007); Sara Duterte (2007–2010)
- Preceded by: Benjamin de Guzman
- Succeeded by: Sara Duterte
- In office February 2, 1988 – March 19, 1998 (Note: Suspended from November 12, 1990, to January 11, 1991. During Duterte's suspension, Vice Mayor Dominador Zuño Jr. served as acting mayor.)
- Vice Mayor: Dominador Zuño Jr. (1988–1992); Luis Bonguyan (1992–1995); Benjamin de Guzman (1995–1998)
- Preceded by: Jacinto Rubillar (OIC)
- Succeeded by: Benjamin de Guzman (acting)

11th Vice Mayor of Davao City
- In office June 30, 2010 – June 30, 2013
- Mayor: Sara Duterte
- Preceded by: Sara Duterte
- Succeeded by: Paolo Duterte
- Officer in Charge; May 2, 1986 – November 27, 1987
- Mayor: Zafiro Respicio
- Preceded by: Cornelio Maskariño (OIC)
- Succeeded by: Gilbert Abellera (OIC)

Member of the Philippine House of Representatives from Davao City's 1st congressional district
- In office June 30, 1998 – June 30, 2001
- Preceded by: Prospero Nograles
- Succeeded by: Prospero Nograles
Party positions held
Chairman of PDP–Laban
Incumbent
Assumed office February 7, 2016
President	Koko Pimentel; Manny Pacquiao; Alfonso Cusi; Jose Alvarez; Robin Padilla
Preceded by	Ismael Sueno
Chairman of the Davao City Liberal Party
In office 2009 – February 21, 2015
Preceded by	Peter Laviña

Personal details
- Born: Rodrigo Roa Duterte; March 28, 1945 (age 81) Maasin, Leyte, Philippine Commonwealth
- Party: PDP–Laban (1986–1987; 1998–2009; 2015–present) (Note: According to Duterte, he never left PDP–Laban; he was the Davao City chairman of the Liberal Party in 2009, and was nationally affiliated with the party in the 2010 and 2013 elections.); HTL (local party; 2001–present)
- Other political affiliations: See list: Liberal (2009–2015); LAMMP (1998–2001); Alyansa sa Katawhan sa Dabaw (1998–2001); Lakas–NUCD–UMDP (1995–1998); NPC (1992–1995); Nacionalista (1990–1992); Lakas ng Dabaw (1988–1998); Independent (before 1986; 1986–1990); Partido ng Bayan (1986)
- Spouse: Elizabeth Zimmerman (m. 1973; ann. 2000)
- Domestic partner: Honeylet Avanceña (c. 1996–present)
- Children: Paolo; Sara; Sebastian; Veronica
- Parents: Vicente Duterte (father); Soledad Roa (mother)
- Relatives: Duterte family
- Education: Lyceum of the Philippines University (BA); San Beda College (LLB)
- Nicknames: Digong; Rody; PRRD
- Criminal information
- Status: Remanded under ICC custody
- Criminal charge: Crimes against humanity of murder
- Capture status: Arrested on March 11, 2025

Details
- Imprisoned at: United Nations Detention Unit
- Rodrigo Duterte's voice Rodrigo Duterte affirms the Philippines v. China arbitral ruling before the United Nations General Assembly. Recorded September 22, 2020

Rodrigo Roa Duterte (Note: Duterte has been given a variety of nicknames. Some common nicknames for him are Digong, Rody, and the initials DU30, PRRD, and FPRRD, and less commonly P-Rod, Pigong and PDiggy. He has also been referred to as "the Punisher", "Duterte Harry", and "the Death Squad mayor".) (Note: English: /dʊˈtɜːrteɪ -ˈtɛər-/, Filipino: [ɾodˈɾiː.go ˈɾoː.ɐ dʊˈtɛːɾ.tɛ]) KGCR (born March 28, 1945) is a Filipino lawyer and politician who served as the 16th president of the Philippines from 2016 to 2022. He served as mayor of Davao City for three non-consecutive terms between 1988 and 2016. Duterte is the first Philippine president from Mindanao, and the oldest person to assume office, beginning his term at age 71. Duterte is the chairman of PDP–Laban, the ruling party during his presidency.

Born in Maasin, Leyte (now in Southern Leyte), Duterte moved to Davao as a child where his father, Vicente Duterte, served as provincial governor. He studied political science at the Lyceum of the Philippines University, graduating in 1968, before obtaining a law degree from San Beda College of Law in 1972. He then worked as a lawyer and prosecutor for Davao City, before becoming vice mayor and, subsequently, mayor of the city in the wake of the 1986 People Power Revolution. Duterte won seven terms and served as mayor of Davao for over 22 years, during which the once crime-ridden city became peaceful and investor-friendly.

Duterte's 2016 presidential campaign led to his election victory. During his presidency, his domestic policy focused on combating the illegal drug trade by initiating the controversial war on drugs, fighting crime and corruption, and intensified efforts against terrorism and communist insurgency. He launched a massive infrastructure plan, initiated liberal economic reforms, streamlined government processes, and proposed a shift to a federal system of government which was ultimately unsuccessful. He declared the intention to pursue an "independent foreign policy", and strengthened relations with China and Russia and also oversaw the controversial burial of Ferdinand Marcos, the siege of Marawi, and the government's response to the COVID-19 pandemic. Duterte praised the Armed Forces of the Philippines for their role in national security and disaster response, particularly highlighting their efforts during the siege of Marawi and in providing humanitarian assistance during natural calamities.

Duterte's popularity and domestic approval rating remained relatively high throughout his presidency, and by the end of his term he was the most popular president since the 1986 revolution. He initially announced his candidacy for vice president in the 2022 election; in October 2021, he said he was retiring from politics. The next month, he filed his candidacy for senator but withdrew it on December 14.

Duterte's political positions have been described as populist and nationalist. (Note: Multiple sources:) Duterte became known for his political ideology of Dutertismo. His political success has been aided by his vocal support for the extrajudicial killing of drug users and criminals. Duterte is allegedly the founder and head of the Davao Death Squad, a vigilante squad of gangsters and former police that summarily executed more than 1,400 people by 2016. Duterte has admitted to personally killing suspected criminals, and the usage of death squad. His career has sparked numerous protests and attracted controversy, particularly over human rights issues and his controversial comments. The International Criminal Court (ICC) opened a preliminary investigation into Duterte's drug war in 2018, prompting Duterte to withdraw the Philippines from that body in response.

Duterte was arrested on March 11, 2025 and transferred to ICC custody in The Hague the next day, making him the first Philippine president to face an international tribunal and the first Asian leader to face a trial before the ICC. Despite this, he was re-elected as the mayor of Davao City in 2025; as he remains in The Hague, his son Baste is serving in his place as the acting mayor. As he failed to take his oath within the prescribed six-month period, he was disqualified from assuming office under the provisions of the Local Government Code. Duterte is scheduled to face trial for crimes against humanity on November 30, 2026.

== Early years ==
Rodrigo Roa Duterte was born on March 28, 1945, in Maasin, Leyte. His father was Vicente Gonzales Duterte (1911–1968), a Cebuano lawyer, and his mother, Soledad Gonzales Roa (1916–2012), was a schoolteacher from Cabadbaran, Agusan and a civic leader, of Chinese and Spanish mestizo descent. Duterte has said that his grandfather was Chinese and hailed from Xiamen in Fujian, China. Duterte has four siblings: Eleanor (born 1941/42), Emmanuel, Jocelyn (1948–2023) and Benjamin ("Bong", 1953–2026).

Duterte's father was mayor of Danao, Cebu, and subsequently the provincial governor of (the then-undivided) Davao province. Rodrigo's cousin Ronald was mayor of Cebu City from 1983 to 1986. Ronald's father, Ramon Duterte, also held that position from 1957 to 1959. The Dutertes consider the Cebu-based political families of the Durano and the Almendras clan as relatives. Duterte also has relatives from the Roa clan in Leyte through his mother's side. Duterte's family lived in Maasin, and in his father's hometown in Danao, until he was four years old. Duterte was heavily influenced by his mother, who unlike Vicente was a staunch anti-Marcos activist, which led the young Duterte to have a divided opinion on the Marcoses. Duterte later said Marcos could have been the best president, but he was a dictator. The Dutertes initially moved to Mindanao in 1948 but still went back and forth to the Visayas until 1949. They finally settled in the Davao Region in 1950. Vicente worked as a lawyer engaged in private practice. Soledad worked as a teacher until 1952, when Vicente entered politics.

=== Education and early law career ===
Duterte went to Laboon Elementary School in Maasin for a year. He spent his remaining elementary days at Santa Ana Elementary School in Davao City, where he completed his primary education in 1956. He finished his secondary education in the High School Department of Holy Cross College of Digos (now Cor Jesu College) in Digos, Davao province, after being expelled twice from previous schools, including one in the Ateneo de Davao University (AdDU) High School due to misconduct. He graduated in 1968 with a Bachelor of Arts degree in political science at the Lyceum of the Philippines in Manila.

Duterte obtained a law degree from San Beda College of Law in 1972, passing the bar exam in the same year. He worked as a professor in the national police academy, and was a member of an organization called Nationalist Alliance for Justice, Freedom and Democracy. He later served as the OIC vice mayor of Davao City, assisting evacuees from Davao City remote areas and working for the release of soldiers captured by the New Peoples Army (NPA). Eventually, he became a special counsel at the City Prosecution Office in Davao City from 1977 to 1979, fourth assistant city prosecutor from 1979 to 1981, third assistant city prosecutor from 1981 to 1983, and second assistant city prosecutor from 1983 to 1986.

=== Sexual abuse claims ===
Duterte has claimed he was sexually abused by a priest when he was a minor. After he was challenged by the Catholic Bishops' Conference of the Philippines (CBCP) and AdDU officials to name the priest and file a case against him, Duterte then revealed the priest's name as Mark Falvey (died 1975). The Jesuits of the Society of Jesus in the Philippines confirmed that according to press reports in the United States, in May 2007, the Society of Jesus agreed to a tentative payout of US$16 million to settle claims that Falvey sexually abused at least nine children in Los Angeles from 1959 to 1975. Accusations against Falvey began in 2002, although he was never charged with a crime. In May 2008, the Diocese of Sacramento paid a $100,000-settlement to a person allegedly raped and molested by Mark's brother, Arthur Falvey. However, it was not clearly indicated in the report if Mark Falvey was assigned at the Jesuit-run Ateneo de Davao. When asked why he did not complain when the abuse supposedly happened, Duterte claimed that he was too young to complain about the priest's abuse and was intimidated by authorities at that time. He also stated that he never disclosed the abuse even after he was expelled and moved to a different high school, not even to his family.

=== Shooting of student at law school ===
Duterte stated at a rally in April 2016 that he shot a fellow student who had bullied him about his Visayan origin as well as other students of the same ethnicity, while at San Beda law college. He said, "But the truth is, I'm used to shooting people. When we were about to graduate from San Beda, I shot a person." Duterte said that he shot the student in a corridor at the college when the said student called him names again. He later told a reporter that the student survived, but refused to answer any further questions about the incident.

However, in an interview aired on 24 Oras and published on the official GMA News Online website on April 22, 2016, retired labor arbiter Arthur Amansec said Duterte and Octavio Goco at that time were both playing with a gun as it was normal for students to bring guns to school in the seventies. Amansec is Duterte's former classmate in San Beda College who witnessed the incident. He added that "the bullet hit the school's wooden floor and was embedded there." Amansec emphasized that Duterte and Goco remained friends until Goco died in the United States years later.

== Political career in Davao City ==
Duterte in 1987

After the 1986 People Power Revolution that toppled the regime of President Ferdinand Marcos, Duterte was appointed officer-in-charge vice mayor of Davao City by President Corazon Aquino. In the 1988 local elections, he ran for mayor under Lakas ng Dabaw, a local political alliance, defeating former OIC Mayor Zafiro Respicio by a narrow margin of 6,000 votes.

As mayor of Davao City, Duterte made efforts to unite the different tribes and political groups in the city. He set a precedent by designating deputy mayors to represent the administrative districts, as well as the Lumad and Moro peoples in the city government; this was later copied by other cities in other parts of the Philippines.

In December 1990, Duterte joined the Nacionalista Party upon the persuasion of Senator Juan Ponce Enrile. In 1992, he successfully defended his seat from 1st district representative Prospero Nograles. In 1995, after Flor Contemplacion, a Filipina, was executed in Singapore after confessing to a double murder, Duterte allegedly burned a flag of Singapore (though this claim was later denied) and joined 1,000 employees of Davao City in protest.

In 1998, because he was term-limited to run again for mayor, Duterte ran and won as congressman of the city's 1st district under Laban ng Makabayang Masang Pilipino. He was a member of five House committees, namely: National Defense, Public Order and Security, Health, Transportation and Communications, and Cooperative Development. He filed 64 measures, including 45 bills, with one enacted into law—Republic Act No. 8969, which declared the third Friday of August a special holiday in Davao City. He expressed disinterest with his new post, describing it as less engaging compared to his time as mayor. He attempted to resign in 1999 after his son Paolo was accused of mauling a hotel guard, but House Speaker Manny Villar and President Joseph Estrada declined his resignation.

After embarking on a diplomatic trip to Brazil between 2000 and 2001, Duterte made a brief stopover in the United States, but as he was about to step out of the Los Angeles International Airport, he was held up by law enforcement officers and interrogated about his travel documents. After the stopover, Duterte never again returned to the United States.

In 2001, he was elected mayor of Davao for a fourth unconsecutive term, defeating his former ally, incumbent Mayor Benjamin de Guzman; his estranged sister Jocelyn attempted to run against him as well, but was disqualified by the Commission on Elections. He was re-elected in 2004, defeating de Guzman for the second time, and in 2007 with virtually no opposition. In 2003, Duterte formally laid out the scope of Davao City's Chinatown, the first Chinatown in Mindanao, along the newly renamed Magsaysay Street, while establishing the Davao City Chinatown Development Council to oversee the area's development.

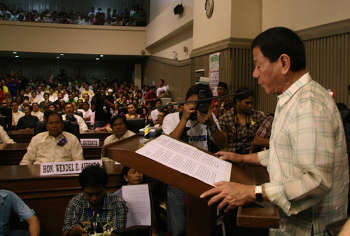
Newly elected Davao City Vice Mayor Duterte reading his inaugural speech in June 2010

In 2010, he was elected vice mayor, succeeding his daughter Sara, who was elected as mayor.

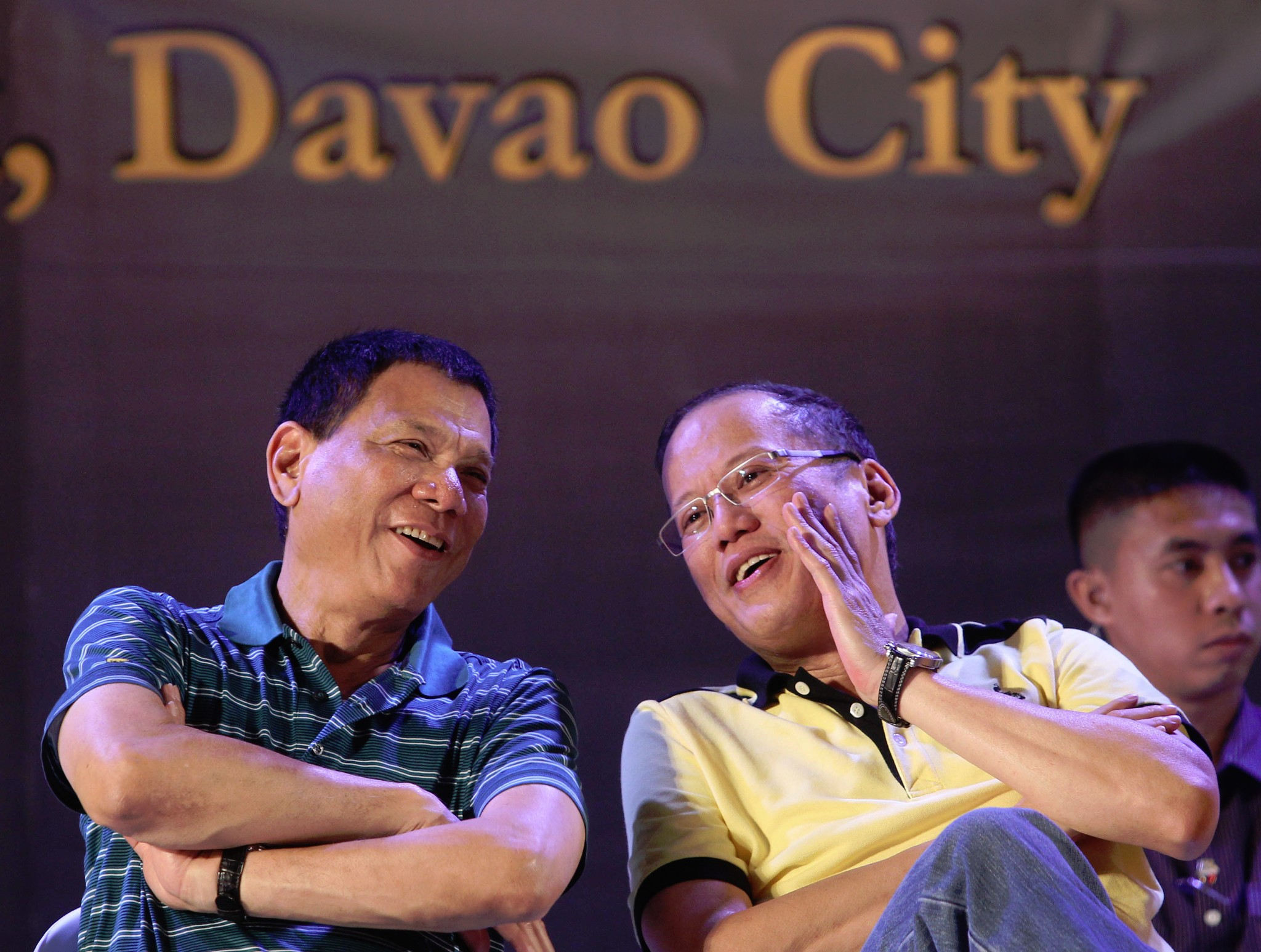
Mayor Duterte (left) with President Benigno Aquino III during a meeting with local government unit leaders in Davao City in 2013

Duterte was elected unopposed for his seventh term in 2013. In November of that year, Davao City sent rescue and medical teams to Tacloban to give aid to the victims of Typhoon Haiyan (locally known in the country as Typhoon Yolanda). Financial assistance was also given to Bohol and Cebu for earthquake victims.

Duterte also passed Davao City's Women Development Code, which aims "to uphold the rights of women and the belief in their worth and dignity as human beings". Duterte banned swimsuit competitions in beauty pageants in Davao City. He gained prominence for supporting the first-ever Gawad Kalinga Village inside a jail facility in Davao City. It is a home-type jail with ten cottages built inside the compound, which now serve as homes for female inmates.

=== Law and order ===
During Duterte's tenure as mayor, Davao City experienced economic boom and a significant decrease in crime from being a conflict-ridden area between communists and right-wing groups during the 1970s and 1980s, and is constantly rated as among the safest in the country. The city also ranks high in the world according to crowdsourced survey site Numbeo, a narrative that gained currency in the national media, creating a widespread public perception that has been a significant factor in establishing support for his nationwide drug policy. The city was also awarded "Most Child-Friendly City for Highly-Urbanized Category" in 1998, 1999, 2013 and 2014.

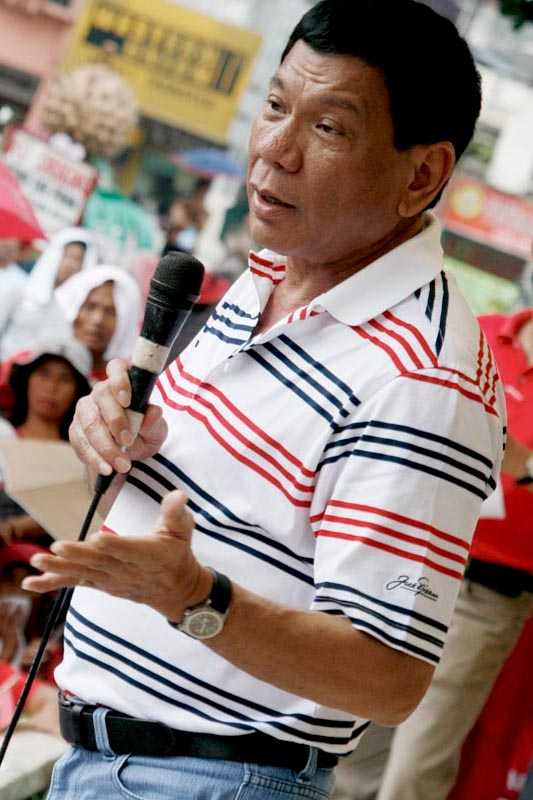
Duterte speaks with Davao City residents in 2009.

Under Duterte's watch, the city council imposed a prohibition on selling, serving, drinking, and consuming alcoholic beverages from 01:00 until 08:00 each morning. Duterte signed Executive Order No. 39, reducing the speed limits for all kinds of motor vehicles within the territorial jurisdiction of Davao City in the interest of public safety and order. Duterte also signed Executive Order No. 04 creating the implementing of rules and regulations for a new comprehensive anti-smoking ordinance. A firecracker ban was also implemented by the City Council through the support of Duterte. Davao acquired 10 ambulances for central 911 intended for medical emergencies and 42 mobile patrol vehicles and motorcycles for the Davao City Police Office. Duterte, through Executive Order No. 24, ordered all shopping malls and commercial centers to install, operate and maintain high end and high definition closed circuit television (CCTV) cameras at all entrance and exit points of their premises.

In September 2015, Duterte was contacted by a restaurant owner in Davao City after a local tourist refused to comply with the city's public anti-smoking ordinance. The then-mayor went to the restaurant and had the tourist choose to be shot at his crotch, have himself imprisoned, or swallow his cigarette butt; the tourist chose the latter and apologized to Duterte. Duterte was then met with criticisms especially from the Commission on Human Rights (CHR).

=== Alleged involvement with Davao Death Squad ===
Duterte has been linked by human rights groups such as Amnesty International and Human Rights Watch to extrajudicial killings of over 1,400 alleged criminals and street children by vigilante death squads. In the April 2009 UN General Assembly of the Human Rights Council, the UN report (Eleventh Session Agenda item 3, par 21) said, "The Mayor of Davao City has done nothing to prevent these killings, and his public comments suggest that he is, in fact, supportive." Duterte emphasized that the concept of human rights for criminals is Western and should not apply to the Philippines; he further challenged human rights officials to file a case against him if they could provide evidence of his links with vigilante groups.

We're the ninth-safest city. How do you think I did it? How did I reach that title among the world's safest cities? Kill them all [criminals].

— Duterte, May 15, 2015

Duterte frequently expressed his support for the extrajudicial killings that occurred during his tenure as Davao City mayor, while alternately denying and admitting his links to them. During his post-presidency in October 2023, he admitted on his talk show program Gikan sa Masa, para sa Masa to using intelligence funds to finance the extrajudicial killings done during his time as mayor.

=== Federalism advocacy ===
In September 2014, Duterte and former mayors and governors, calling themselves the Mindanao Council of Leaders, advocated for a federalist government. A month later, Duterte attended an event sponsored by the Federal Movement for a Better Philippines in Cebu City.

In December 2014, Duterte held a summit entitled "Mindanaons Forging Unity Toward a Federal System of Government".

== 2016 presidential campaign ==
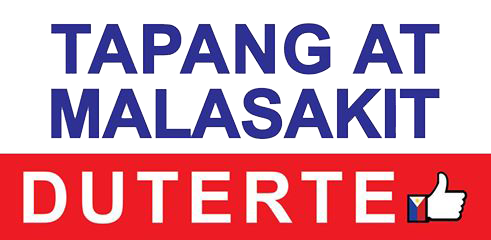
Duterte–Cayetano 2016 campaign logo

Prospects of Duterte running for president in the 2016 elections began in February 2015, during which Duterte, then outgoing Mayor of Davao City, re-entered the PDP-Laban party, who courted him to run for president. A month later, Duterte emerged as a preferred presidential candidate in a Pulse Asia poll; tied with Manila mayor and former president Joseph Estrada, Duterte ranked third behind Senator Grace Poe and frontrunner, Vice President Jejomar Binay. In the following months leading to October, however, Duterte repeatedly declined his supporters' clamors for him to run as president because of what he described as a "flawed government system", as well as lack of funds and opposition from his family members—notably, from his daughter Sara. Additionally, Duterte said he will retire from politics after his mayorship ends, but only if Sara runs as mayor.

PDP-Laban standard bearer Martin Diño unexpectedly withdrew his candidacy on October 29 and named Duterte as his substitute. A month later, Duterte formally announced his presidential bid and accepted Alan Peter Cayetano's offer to be his running mate; Duterte also named Sara as his substitute for Mayor of Davao City.

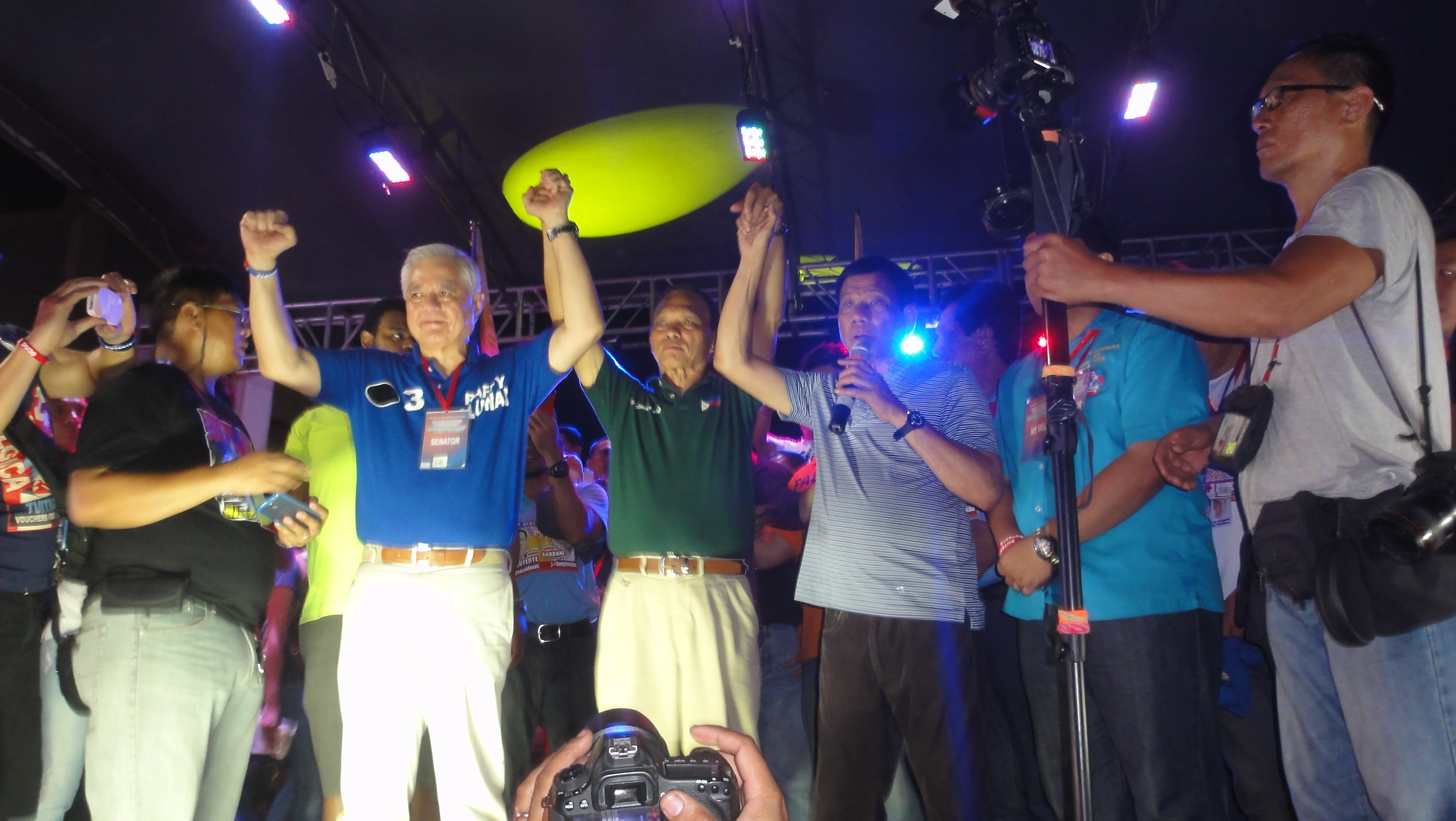
Duterte (3rd from right) and allies campaigning in Pandacan, Manila on April 23, 2016

During his campaign, Duterte gained distinction for his emphatic anti-crime message and push to reduce "Imperial Manila's" dominance. At the same time, he made controversial remarks, including promising to kill tens of thousands of criminals and eradicate crime in six months. He also said his presidency would be "a bloody one", and that he would pardon himself, the police, and soldiers accused of human rights abuses at the end of his six-year term. Duterte also apologized after saying out of anger when recalling the events that he "should have been first" to rape Jacqueline Hamill, an Australian missionary who was gang-raped and killed during the 1989 Davao hostage crisis. After the United States' and Australia's ambassadors to the Philippines criticized him for the rape comments, Duterte threatened to sever diplomatic ties with the countries if elected.

=== Constitutional reforms ===
Duterte campaigned for decentralization and a shift to a federal government during the 2016 presidential election. In an October 2014 forum organized by Federal Movement for a Better Philippines in Cebu City prior to joining the presidential race, the then-mayor of Davao City called for the creation of two federal states for Moro people as a solution to the problems besetting Mindanao. Mayor Duterte said that Nur Misuari and his Moro National Liberation Front do not see eye-to-eye with the Moro Islamic Liberation Front which the administration of President Benigno Aquino III had inked a peace deal with. He also said that the "template of the Bangsamoro Basic Law is federal", but what is granted to the Bangsamoro should also be granted to other Moro groups and other regions in the country. In a dialogue with the Makati Business Club prior to the elections, Duterte said he is open to "toning down the Constitution" to accommodate more foreign investors to the Philippines. He also said he is open to up to 70 percent foreign ownership of businesses in the country and foreign lease of lands up to 60 years, but will "leave it to Congress to decide".

=== Election to the presidency ===
On May 30, 2016, the 16th Congress of the Philippines proclaimed Duterte as the president-elect of the Philippines after he topped the official count by the Congress of the Philippines for the 2016 presidential election with 16,601,997 votes, 6.6 million more than his closest rival, Mar Roxas. Camarines Sur representative Leni Robredo on the other hand, was proclaimed as the vice president-elect of the Philippines with 14,418,817 votes, narrowly defeating Senator Bongbong Marcos by 263,473 votes.

Duterte's election victory was attributed to growing public dissatisfaction on the perceived failures of administrations that followed the 1986 EDSA Revolution. It was also aided by a strong social media and grassroots fanbase and the endorsement of the influential Iglesia ni Cristo, known for its block-voting.

== Presidency (2016–2022) ==
Presidential styles of Rodrigo Duterte
- Reference style: President Duterte, His Excellency (rarely used) (Note: Duterte himself does not use the style of Excellency President)
- Spoken style: Your Excellency (rarely used)
- Alternative style: Mr. President, President, Mayor

Duterte was inaugurated as the sixteenth president of the Philippines on June 30, 2016, succeeding Benigno Aquino III. At age 71, Duterte became the oldest person elected to the presidency, the first local chief executive to get elected straight to the Office of the President, the second Cebuano president (after Sergio Osmeña), and the first Visayan president from Mindanao.

In 2019, he became the first Philippine president since 1986 not to publicize his statement of assets, liabilities, and net worth (SALN); his SALNs since 2019 would only be revealed post-presidency in November 2025.

=== Early actions ===
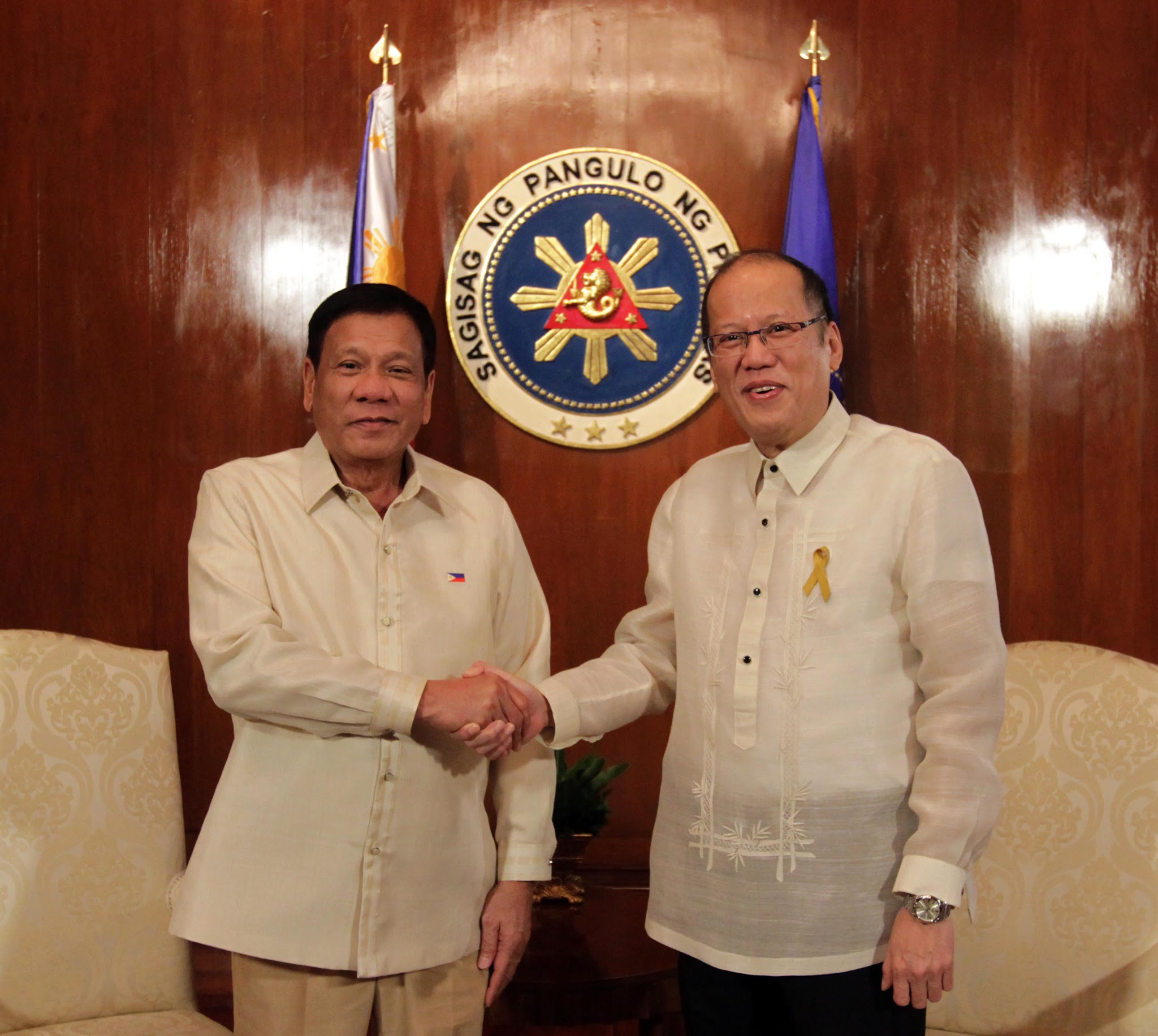
President-elect Duterte (left) and outgoing President Benigno Aquino III at Malacañang Palace on inauguration day, June 30, 2016

Shortly after his inauguration, Duterte held his first Cabinet meeting to lay out their first agenda, which included the country's disaster risk reduction management, decongesting Ninoy Aquino International Airport in Manila; he also expressed his ideas and concerns regarding the territorial disputes in the South China Sea prior to the announcement of the verdict of the Philippines' arbitration case against China over the issue, which the Philippines later won. On July 4, he issued his first executive order, allowing his Cabinet Secretary to supervise over several agencies that focus on poverty reduction. He called for the reimposition of capital punishment in the country to execute criminals involved in "heinous" crimes, such as illegal drug trade, insisting on hanging.

During his first 100 days in office, Duterte issued an executive order on freedom of information, launched an intensified campaign against illegal drugs, sought to resume peace talks with communist insurgents, formulated a comprehensive tax reform plan, led efforts to pass the Bangsamoro Basic Law, made efforts to streamline government transactions, launched the nationwide 9–1–1 rescue and 8888 complaint hotlines, established a one-stop service center for overseas Filipino workers, and increased in the combat and incentive pay of soldiers and police personnel.

Duterte made moves to limit US visiting troops in the country, and has reached out to China and Russia to improve relations. He launched tirades against international critics, particularly, United States President Barack Obama, the US government, the United Nations, and the European Union, which expressed condemnation to his unprecedented war on drugs that led to the deaths of about 3,300 people, half of which were killed by unknown assailants, and the arrest of 22,000 drug suspects and surrender of about 731,000 people.

Duterte takes his oath of office as the 16th president of the Philippines on June 30, 2016.

Following the September 2 bombing in Davao City that killed 14 people in the city's central business district, on September 3 Duterte declared a "state of lawlessness", and on the following day issued Proclamation No. 55 to officially declare a "state of national emergency on account of lawless violence in Mindanao". On December 7, Duterte signed Executive Order No. 10 creating a consultative committee to review the 1987 Constitution of the Philippines.

Duterte adjusted to working and residing at the Malacañang Palace by dividing his workweek between Manila and Davao City, spending three days in each city and utilizing the Malacañang of the South while in Davao.

A Pulse Asia survey conducted from July 2–8 showed that Duterte had a trust rating of 91%, the highest of the six presidents since the Marcos dictatorship. In December 2016, Duterte was ranked 70th on Forbes list of The World's Most Powerful People.

=== Domestic policy ===
==== Economic policy ====
Duterte's socioeconomic policies, referred to as DuterteNomics, include tax reform, infrastructure development, social protection programs, and other policies to promote economic growth and human development in the country. Finance Secretary Carlos Dominguez III has said that the government required what he describes as an "audacious" economic strategy in order for the Philippines to "catch up with its more vibrant neighbors" by 2022 and help it achieve high-income economy status within a generation. The term DuterteNomics was coined to describe the economic policy of the Duterte administration.

Duterte initiated liberal economic reforms to attract foreign investors. In March 2022, he signed Republic Act No. 11647 which amended the Foreign Investment Act of 1991, effectively relaxing restrictions on foreign investments by allowing foreigners to invest in a local enterprise up to 100% of its capital. He signed Republic Act No. 11659, amending the 85-year-old Public Service Act, allowing full foreign ownership of public services, which include airports, expressways, railways, telecommunications, and shipping industries, in the country.

Duterte reformed the country's tax system in an effort to make the country's tax system fairer, simpler, and more efficient. In December 2017, he signed Tax Reform for Acceleration and Inclusion Law (TRAIN Law) which excludes those earning an annual taxable income of ₱250,000 and below from paying the personal income tax, while raising higher excise taxes on vehicles, sugar-sweetened beverages, petroleum products, tobacco and other non-essential goods. Revenues collected from the TRAIN law will help fund the administration's massive infrastructure program. In March 2021, to attract more investments and maintain fiscal stability, Duterte signed the Corporate Recovery and Tax Incentives for Enterprises (CREATE) Act, reducing the 30 percent corporate income tax rate to 25 percent for firms with assets above ₱100 million and to 20 percent for smaller firms. Duterte raised sin taxes on tobacco and vapor products in July 2019, and alcohol beverages and electronic cigarettes in January 2020, to fund the Universal Health Care Act and reduce incidence of deaths and diseases associated with smoking and alcohol consumption.

Duterte's tax reform program has garnered both support and criticism. Critics have argued that the administration's tax policy would burden the poor. The implementation of the TRAIN Law triggered protests from various left-wing groups. On January 15, 2018, protesters gathered at various public market sites, calling for the revocation of TRAIN. However, proponents of the program cite its appeal to foreign investors and economic benefits as the main reasons behind tax reform.

==== Infrastructure development ====
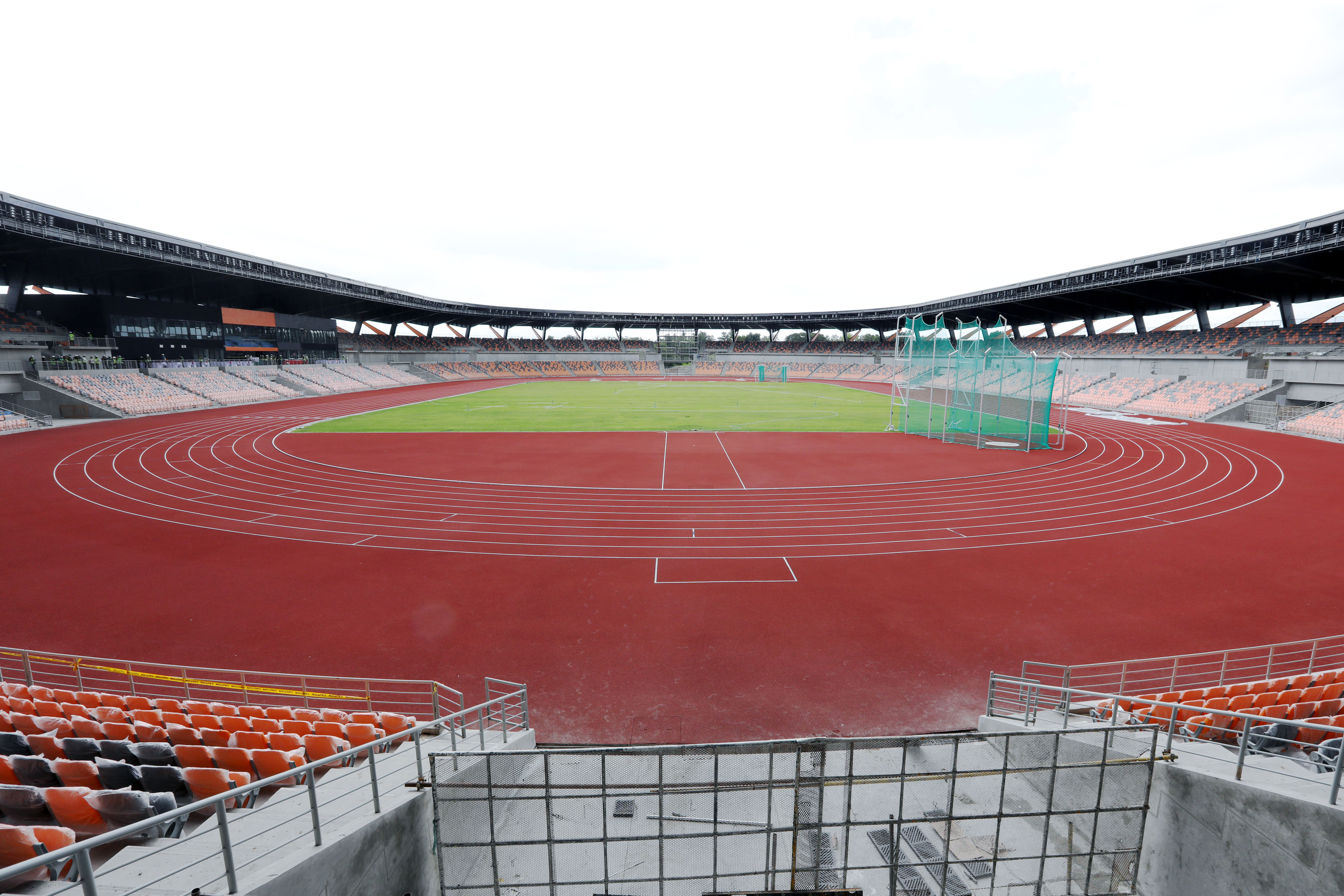
The Athletics Stadium of the New Clark City sports complex, completed on October 12, 2019, 50 days before the opening of the 2019 Southeast Asian Games

To reduce poverty, encourage economic growth, and reduce congestion in Metro Manila, the Duterte administration launched its comprehensive infrastructure program, Build, Build, Build, on April 18, 2017. The program, which forms part of the administration's socioeconomic policy, aimed to usher in the country's "Golden Age of Infrastructure" by increasing the share of spending on public infrastructure in the country's gross domestic product (GDP) from 5.4 percent in 2017 to 7.4 percent in 2022. The administration, in 2017, shifted its infrastructure funding policy from public-private partnerships (PPPs) of previous administrations to government revenues and official development assistance (ODA), particularly from Japan and China, but has since October 2019 engaged with the private sector for additional funding.

The administration revised its list of Infrastructure Flagship Projects (IFPs) under the Build, Build, Build program from 75 to 100 in November 2019, then to 104, and finally, to 112 in 2020, expanding its scope to include health, information and communications technology, and water infrastructure projects to support the country's economic growth and recovery from the COVID-19 pandemic. Some major projects include the Subic-Clark Railway, the North–South Commuter Railway from New Clark City to Calamba, Laguna, the Metro Manila Subway, the expansion of Clark International Airport, the Mindanao Railway (Tagum-Davao-Digos Segment), and the Luzon Spine Expressway Network. By April 2022, 12 IFPs have been completed by the administration, while 88 IFPs, which were on their "advanced stage", have been passed on to the succeeding administration for completion.

From June 2016 to July 2021, a total of 29,264 kilometers (18,184 mi) of roads, 5,950 bridges, 11,340 flood control projects, 222 evacuation centers, and 150,149 elementary and secondary classrooms, and 653 COVID-19 facilities under the Build, Build, Build program had been completed.

==== War on drugs ====
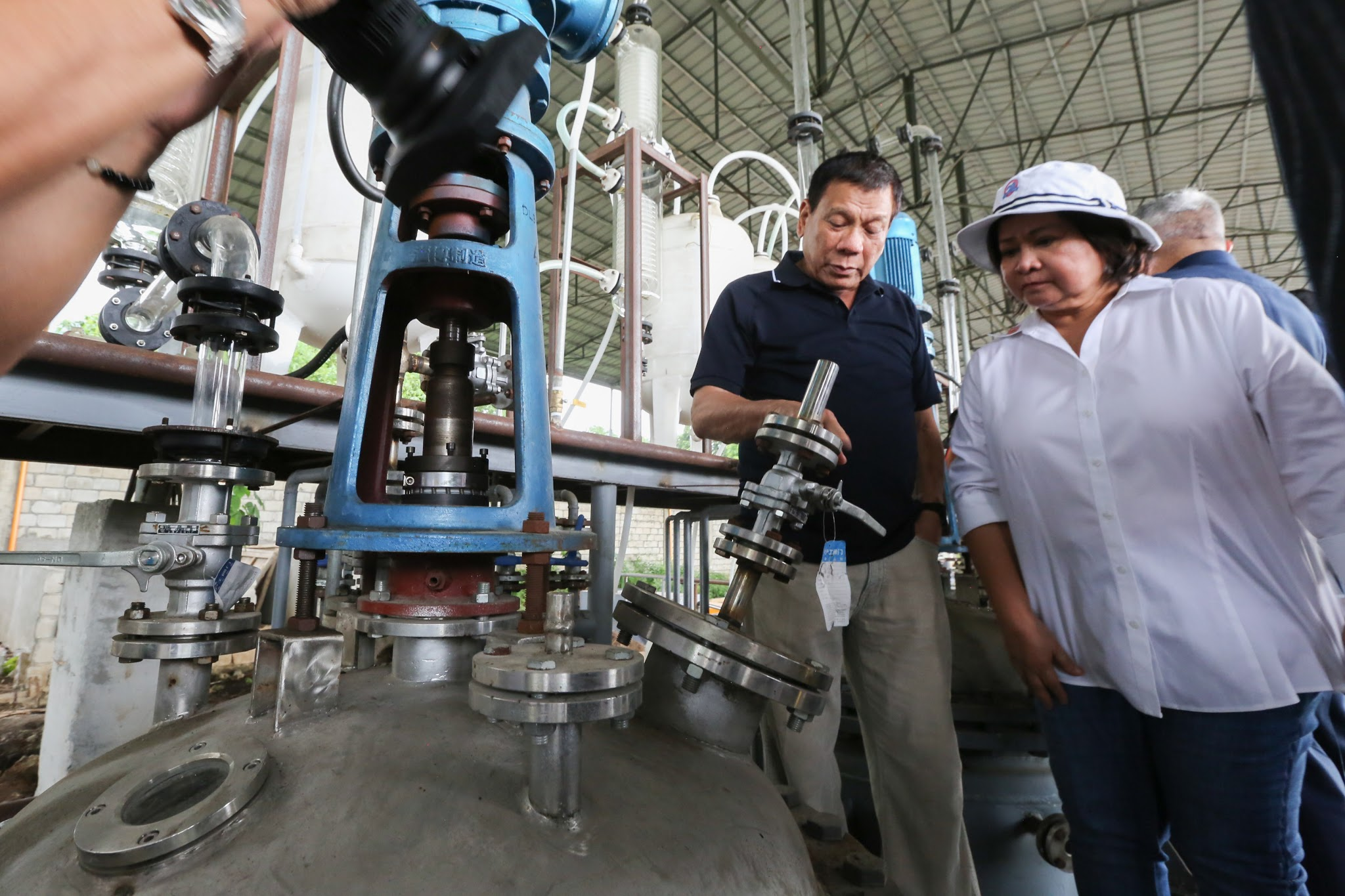
Duterte with Governor Lilia Pineda inspects a seized shabu laboratory in Arayat, Pampanga on September 27, 2016.

Duterte placed the Philippines' illegal drugs problem at the forefront of his presidential campaign, warning the Philippines was at risk of becoming a narco-state. Upon entering office, Duterte began a nationwide crackdown against illegal drugs. At the forefront of the campaign's operations was Oplan Tokhang, which involved policemen knocking on the doors of suspected drug users and inviting them to surrender. Some described the anti-drug campaign as a form of genocide against drug users, in part due to Duterte's early comparison of himself to Adolf Hitler. Among Duterte's early actions included naming three Chinese nationals as alleged drug lords in the Philippines, calling for assistance from the New Peoples Army to join the crackdown, and publicly naming 150 public officials allegedly involved in the drug trade.

Concerns arose worldwide due to the rising death toll during police operations, and drug suspects reportedly fighting back ("nanlaban") was a common alibi of several policemen involved. At the height of the drug crackdown in his early presidency, Duterte urged the policemen to kill drug addicts, promising to pardon them for performing their duties; Duterte's call prompted thousands to surrender, and observers noted this assurance may have emboldened the police to allegedly execute suspects and plant evidence on them. In August 2016, opposition Senator Leila de Lima launched a probe into extrajudicial killings, focusing on cases that took place during Duterte's tenure as mayor of Davao City. De Lima presented as witness an alleged member of Davao City-based vigilante group Davao Death Squad, Edgar Matobato, who testified that Duterte was involved in extrajudicial killings in the city. Duterte dismissed the allegations as fabricated, and the Senate committee formally terminated the inquiry on October 13, 2016, citing a lack of corroborating evidence. Shortly after, Duterte implicated De Lima in the illegal drug trade during her tenure as Justice Secretary under the Aquino III administration. Though De Lima denied the claims, she was later imprisoned in February 2017 due to the drug charges. Two months later, Matobato's lawyer, Jude Josue Sabio, filed charges for crimes against humanity with the International Criminal Court against Duterte and 11 other officials.

Responding to public clamor, in October 2017, Duterte designated the Philippine Drug Enforcement Agency to lead anti-drug operations and temporarily barred the police from joining the raids. Through an executive order he issued in October 2018, Duterte instituted a more balanced approach to the drug problem by establishing the Philippine Anti-Illegal Drugs Strategy, which ordered all government departments and state universities and colleges to implement their own strategies in tackling the country's illegal drug trade; the order also urged local government units, non-government organizations, and private institutions to support and implement the Strategy.

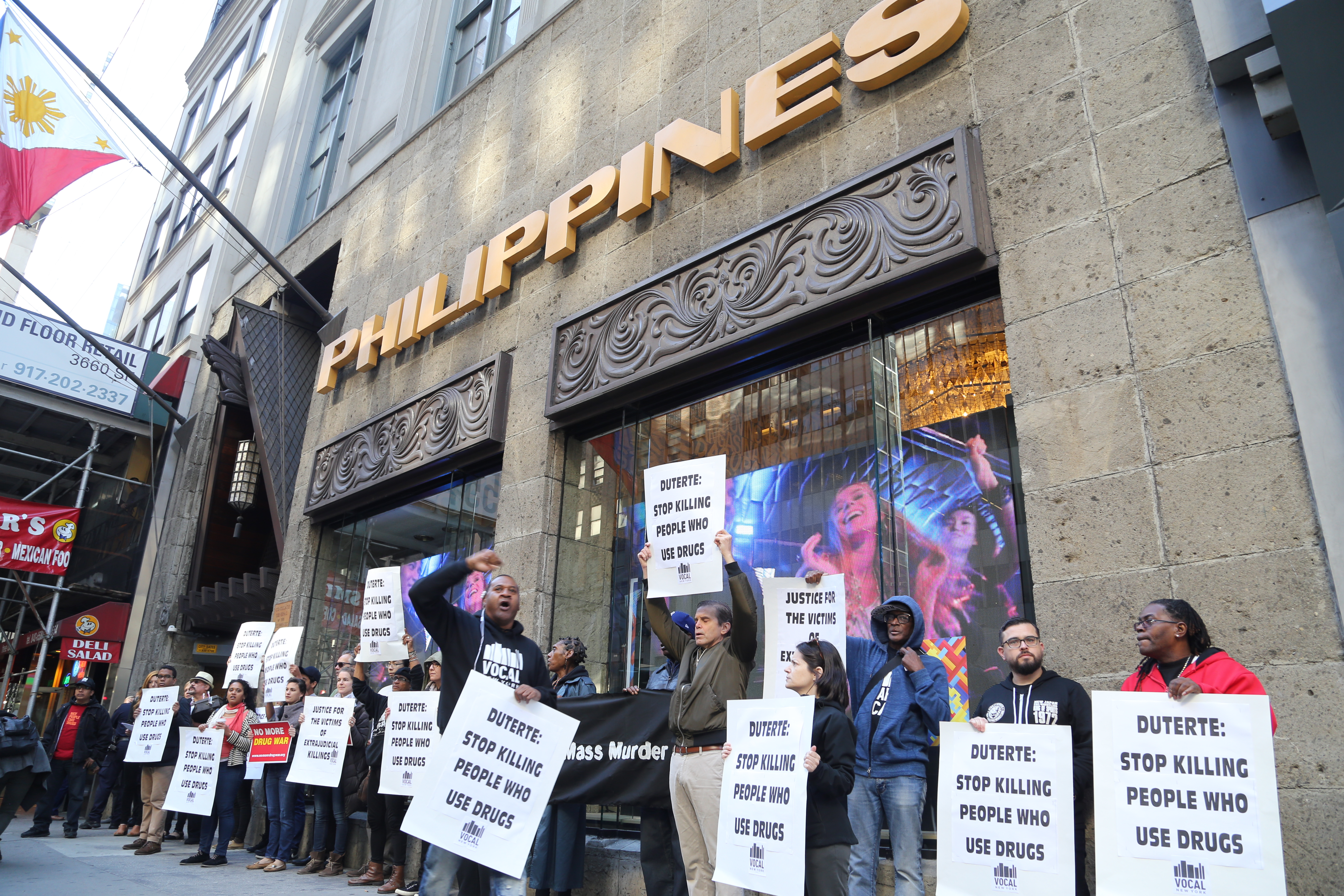
Protesters against the war on drugs gather in front of the Philippine Consulate General in New York City on October 11, 2016.

Duterte campaigned to eliminate illegal drugs in the country within three to six months, but later acknowledged he miscalculated the severity of the problem as he based his approach to that of Davao City during his tenure as the city's mayor. Stating it would take him his entire term to eradicate it, he cited the difficulty in border control due to the country's fragmented geography and lamented that several government officials and law enforcers were involved in drug trafficking. Before leaving office, he implored president-elect Bongbong Marcos to continue tackling the illegal drug problem, but declined an appointment offer as Marcos' drug czar, expressing a desire to retire. By the end of Duterte's term, the number of drug suspects killed since Duterte took office was officially tallied by the government as 6,252; human rights groups, however, claim drug casualties reached as high as 12,000 to 30,000.

Various international publications and media companies had claimed that Duterte's anti-drugs campaign was a war against the poor due to the abject poverty of those arrested or killed. On June 19, 2018, 38 United Nations member states released a collective statement through the United Nations Human Rights Council, calling on the Philippines and Duterte to end the killings in the war on drugs and cooperate in investigating human rights abuses. Though many human rights note that Duterte's war on drugs was a stain on his legacy, the anti-narcotics drive received domestic approval during his term, and 58% of the country's barangays were declared by the government cleared of illegal drugs by February 2022.

==== International Criminal Court ====
In April 2017, a case was filed by lawyer Jude Sabio before the International Criminal Court (ICC), charging Duterte and 11 other officials with crimes against humanity in relation to the deaths of the controversial war on drugs; in response, outgoing ICC chief prosecutor Fatou Bensouda in early 2018 launched a preliminary examination into the charges against the accused. This prompted Duterte in March 2018 to initiate the withdrawal of the Philippines from the ICC, which took effect on March 17, 2019. Duterte rebuked the idea of allowing foreigners to meddle in the country's justice system and his administration emphasized that cases against him should be filed before the national courts. Additionally, he argued that the Rome Statute, which was ratified by the Senate in 2011, was never binding in the Philippines as it was never published in the Official Gazette, a requirement for a law in the country to take effect. For its part, the ICC reiterated that it maintains jurisdiction over crimes which took place before the withdrawal.

Stating that his 2017 case was an orchestrated move by the Liberal Party, notably Senators Antonio Trillanes and Leila de Lima, to discredit Duterte, Sabio retracted his allegations in January 2020 and requested the ICC to dismiss the case. The ICC rejected Sabio's request and asserted that it "cannot effectively destroy or return information once it is in its possession or control". Meanwhile, Duterte's ICC withdrawal was challenged before the Supreme Court by three petitions filed by the Philippine Coalition for the ICC, the Integrated Bar of the Philippines, and opposition senators; though the Court in March 2021 ultimately dismissed all three cases on the grounds that the petitioners were unable to establish legal standing to challenge the ICC withdrawal, the court ruled that the president has no "unbridled authority" to withdraw from treaties.

The ICC, on September 16, 2021, eventually authorized a formal investigation into the war on drugs in the Philippines, focusing on crimes committed between 2016 and March 2019. In response, the Philippine government in November 2021 requested a deferral of the probe, which was suspended by the ICC to assess the request. Four days before Duterte left office, however, ICC prosecutor Karim Ahmad Khan requested the pre-trial chamber of the ICC to immediately resume the investigation after concluding that the deferral request was "not warranted". The succeeding Marcos administration initially declined to allow any ICC probe in the country due to sovereignty issues; however, due to tensions between the Duterte and Marcos political families, the Marcos administration is seen as increasingly open to cooperating with the ICC. Duterte stated he remained unfazed at the threat of arrest, saying he would rather "die first" before facing a foreign court. Salvador Panelo, who served as Duterte's chief legal counsel, alleged that Duterte's political opponents were using the ICC as a "political and propaganda apparatus".

==== Mindanao insurgency ====
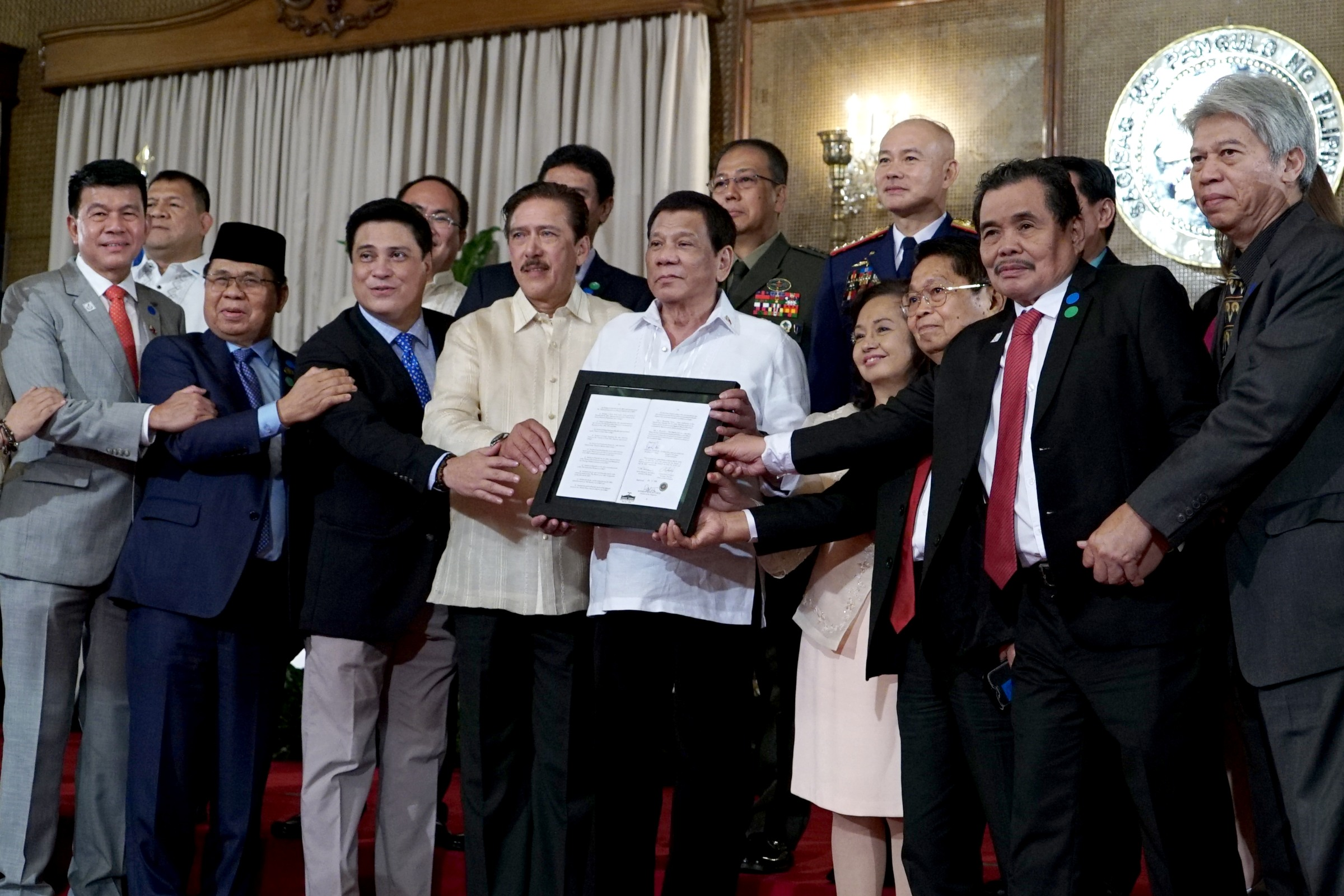
Duterte (center) with other officials during the presentation of the Bangsamoro Organic Law to the MILF at Malacañang Palace on August 6, 2018

Duterte has said that Moro dignity is what the MILF and MNLF are struggling for, and that they are not terrorists. He acknowledged that the Moros were subjected to wrongdoing, historical and in territory.

Duterte was endorsed in the election by Moro National Liberation Front (MNLF) leader Nur Misuari due to his background in Mindanao. Other Muslims also supported Duterte and denounced Roxas, the Aquino-supported pick.

On November 6, 2016, Duterte signed an executive order to expand the Bangsamoro Transition Commission to 21 members from 15, in which 11 will be decided by the MILF and 10 will be nominated by the government. The commission was formed in December 2013 and is tasked to draft the Bangsamoro Basic Law in accordance with the Framework Agreement on the Bangsamoro.

Duterte signed the Bangsamoro Organic Law on July 26, 2018, which abolished the Autonomous Region in Muslim Mindanao and provided for the basic structure of government for the Bangsamoro Autonomous Region, following the agreements set forth in the Comprehensive Agreement on the Bangsamoro peace agreement signed between the Government of the Philippines and the Moro Islamic Liberation Front in 2014.

Duterte signed proclamations granting amnesty to members of the Moro National Liberation Front, and the Moro Islamic Liberation Front in February 2021.

==== Campaign against terrorism ====
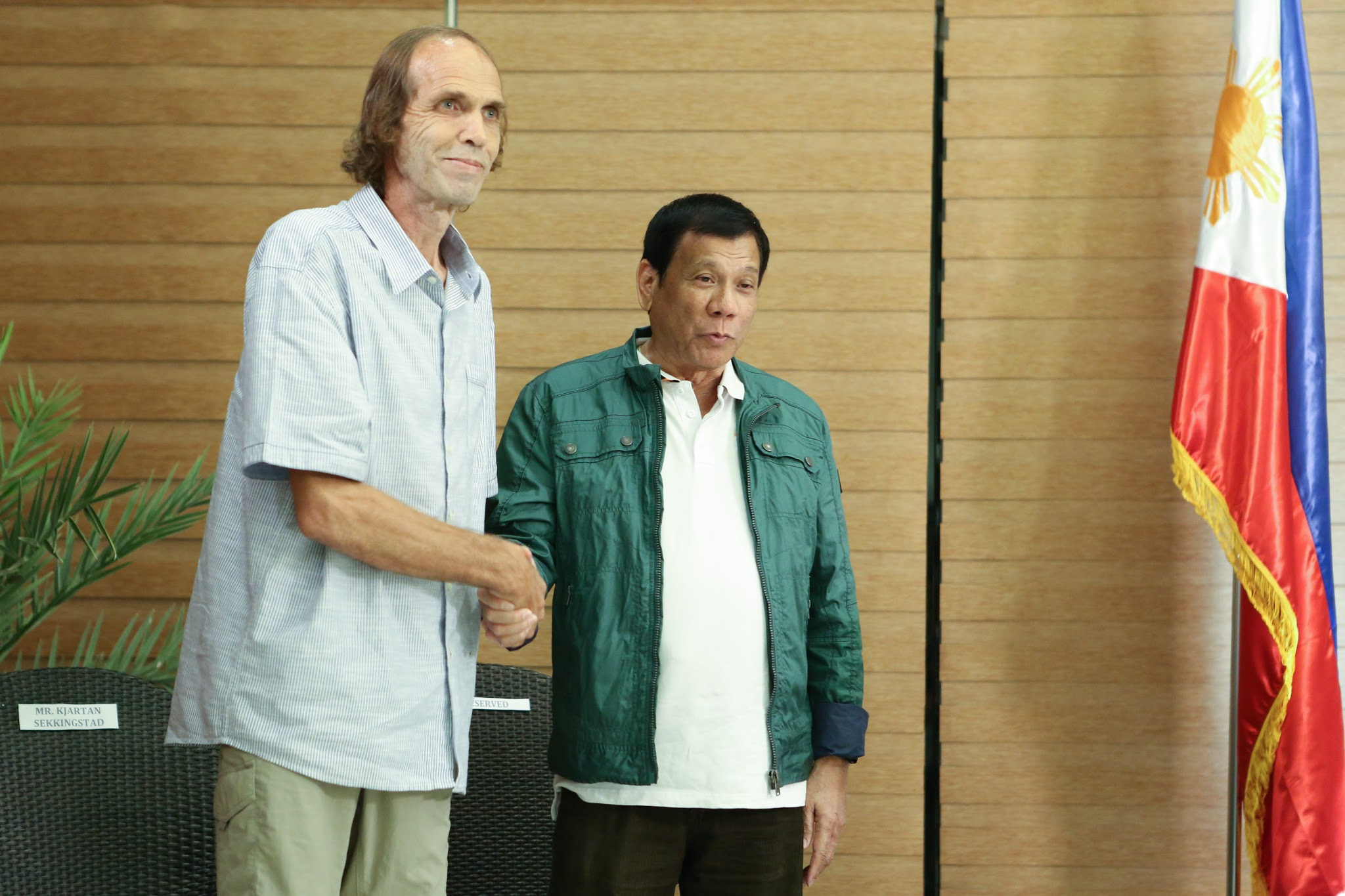
Duterte welcomes Norwegian Kjartan Sekkingstad following his release from Abu Sayyaf captivity.

At the start of 2016, experts warned the Philippines was at risk of having the Islamic State of Iraq and Syria (ISIS) set a foothold in the country. However, Duterte's predecessor, President Aquino III, dismissed the perpetrators of a March 2016 armed attack against the military as mere "mercenaries" wanting to join the ISIS. The earliest terrorist attacks in Duterte's presidency occurred in September 2016 in Davao City; November 2016 in Butig, Lanao del Sur; and in April to May 2017 in Inabanga, Bohol, where the Abu Sayyaf Group (ASG) attempted to establish a position in the Visayas. Though the military eventually quelled the sieges, the events were only a prelude to what would become Duterte's greatest challenge in combating terrorism.

Declaration of liberation of Marawi
Rodrigo Duterte declares Marawi liberated from terrorist influence on October 17, 2017.

On May 23, 2017, Duterte was in his first state visit to Russia, where he met Russian president Vladimir Putin to realign the Philippines's foreign policy away from the United States; among his top priorities in the trip included the acquisition of Russian-made munitions to use against Islamic militants in restive Mindanao. At that time, the Philippine military was in an operation to capture ASG leader Isnilon Hapilon. Duterte cut short his trip and flew back to the Philippines after the Maute Group, which pledged allegiance to the ISIS, occupied the city of Marawi in Lanao del Sur. Upon returning, Duterte declared Martial law across Mindanao and ordered a major offensive on the city to retake it. The battle, which lasted for five months, became the country's longest urban warfare; the city, particularly the downtown area, was left in ruins, largely due to militant fire and military airstrikes, necessitating rehabilitation. Hapilon and Omar Maute were eventually killed, and on October 17, Duterte declared the city liberated from terrorist influence.

Citing the danger posed by Islamic terrorists, Congress, upon Duterte's requests, thrice granted the extension of martial law in Mindanao between 2017 and 2019. The moves drew criticism, particularly from rights groups, who claimed that the extensions were part of a campaign on stifling dissent. By the end of 2019, martial law in Mindanao lapsed, after which Duterte decided not to have it extended. In July 2020, he signed the Anti-Terrorism Act of 2020, which expanded the powers of the government to address the country's growing security challenges. In its enactment, the law repealed the Human Security Act of 2007, which was described by the 2020 law's proponents as weak and inadequate. However, the 2020 law received intense criticism, notably from the academia and rights groups, for allegedly being prone to abuse; a total of 37 petitions were filed by several groups asking the Supreme Court to have the law nullified, making the law the most assailed legislation in Philippine history; the Court ultimately upheld the validity of the law in December 2021, but struck two of the law's provisions.

As Duterte's term approached its end, the military intensified its efforts against Islamic terrorists, which continued to carry a series of attacks in Mindanao and Sulu; notable among these attacks involved suicide bombing, a tactic not commonly used by Filipino terrorists. In February 2021, Duterte created the National Amnesty Commission, which would process amnesty applications of former rebels and determine their eligibility. Additionally, he expanded his administration's reintegration program to include former violent extremists. From 2016 to 2021, 1,544 ASG members, 971 Bangsamoro Islamic Freedom Fighters members, and 1,427 Dawlah Islamiyah members were reportedly captured, killed, or surrendered.

==== Communist insurgency ====
Duterte described himself as left-leaning during his presidential campaign. As he initially had good relations with the left, he received campaign support from leftist groups, particularly in Mindanao. Duterte was a student of Communist Party of the Philippines (CPP) founder Jose Maria Sison at Lyceum of the Philippines University, and Sison stated during the election campaign that Duterte was "the best President the Philippines can have since Marcos".

Upon Duterte's election into office, prospects of restarting peace talks between the Philippine government and the CPP-NPA-NDF, which stalled in 2011, gained momentum. Duterte temporarily released several communist prisoners, notably couples CPP-NPA chairman Benito and CPP-NPA secretary-general Wilma Tiamzon, to join the peace talks in Oslo. In addition, Duterte offered positions for left-leaning activists in his administration, notably in four executive departments: Agrarian Reform, Environment and Natural Resources, Social Welfare and Development, and Labor and Employment. In the months leading to 2017, however, the Duterte administration and the CPP accused each other of not being faithful to the ongoing peace negotiations. The CPP demanded from the administration the release of around 130 political detainees, which—along proposals of the CPP to form a "coalition government"— Duterte declined. Additionally, several leftists appointed by Duterte were rejected by the Commission on Appointments, while others resigned or were fired by Duterte amidst the tense relations. Compounding these were the continued clashes between the military and the NPA and the alternate declaration and lifting of ceasefire amid the ongoing peace talks;

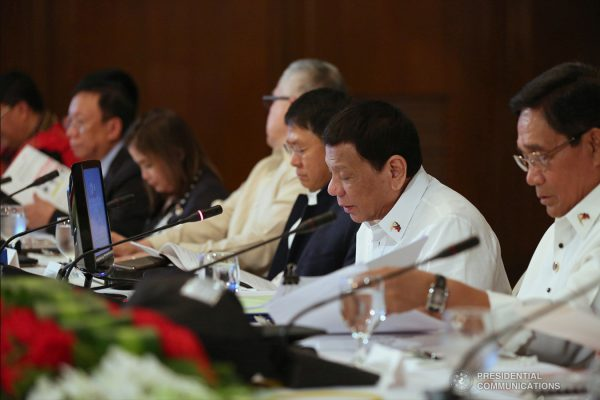
Duterte (2nd from right) presides over a meeting with the NTF-ELCAC at the Malacañang Palace on April 15, 2019.

On February 6, 2017, Duterte, citing continued attacks by the NPA on the military, formally terminated peace negotiations with the CPP-NPA-NDF, designated them as a terrorist organization and ordered the arrest of all NDF negotiators. Through an executive order he issued in December 2018, Duterte established the National Task Force to End Local Communist Armed Conflict (NTF-ELCAC), an inter-agency body that involved a whole-of-nation approach—from the national to local level— in addressing the root causes of communism. The NTF-ELCAC worked in close coordination with the military and focused on developing far-flung localities infiltrated by the NPA. Duterte also granted amnesty to former communist rebels and launched reintegration programs to support them and their families. Ultimately, in March 2019, he permanently terminated peace negotiations with the CPP-NPA-NDF, facilitating localized peace talks with the rebels.

Duterte left office with the number of NPA guerrilla fronts in the country reduced from 89 to 23, and about 20,579 communist rebels reportedly surrendered from 2016 to 2021. Despite its success in reducing communist insurgency in the country, Duterte's administration was marred by numerous allegations of red-tagging, notably the left-leaning Makabayan Bloc; Duterte and the military dismissed the red-tagging accusations and argued the government was merely "identifying" them as communist fronts. Duterte also received criticism after he threatened to order the military in mid-2017 to bomb Lumad schools, which he and the military suspected to shelter rebels and teach subversion. Additionally, the military and the NTF-ELCAC were denounced after they cited clandestine recruitment activities by the communist rebels within university campuses nationwide, notably in both state-run University of the Philippines and Polytechnic University of the Philippines. Several human rights organizations called on the succeeding Bongbong Marcos administration to abolish the NTF-ELCAC due to continued red-tagging allegations; the calls, however, were later rejected by Marcos.

==== COVID-19 pandemic ====
During the early phase of the COVID-19 pandemic, Duterte downplayed the severity of the outbreak and urged the public to avoid anti-Chinese sentiment. In a February 2020 press briefing, he assured citizens that "everything is well" and stated that the public should refrain from discriminating against Chinese nationals. The first reported COVID-19 case in the Philippines was on January 30, 2020, prompting Duterte to issue bans on the entry of Chinese nationals from China and calling for calm. Duterte changed his tune in March, during which he placed the Philippines under a State of National Calamity and ordered a lockdown in Luzon. His administration opted to use what it described as "draconian measures" to control the contagion, and Duterte employed the military and police to enforce the public's strict adherence to quarantine and health protocols.

As countries were scrambling in securing COVID-19 vaccines for their own citizens, Duterte called for patience amid criticism. To expedite vaccine procurement, Duterte rejected creating a committee and designated Carlito Galvez Jr. as "vaccine czar", who had the gargantuan task of acquiring vaccines from other countries. Additionally, Duterte personally requested vaccines from world leaders, notably Chinese president Xi Jinping and Russian President Vladimir Putin. China and Russia responded favorably, and the Duterte administration started its vaccination program on March 1, 2021, a day after receiving 600,000 CoronaVac vaccines sent by the Chinese government. Duterte also used the US-Philippines Visiting Forces Agreement as leverage in securing vaccines from the United States, threatening to scrap the military pact. In addition, in an apparent effort to help the Philippines gain access to US-developed vaccines, Duterte granted absolute pardon to US soldier Joseph Scott Pemberton, who was serving prison for killing transgender Jennifer Laude in 2014.

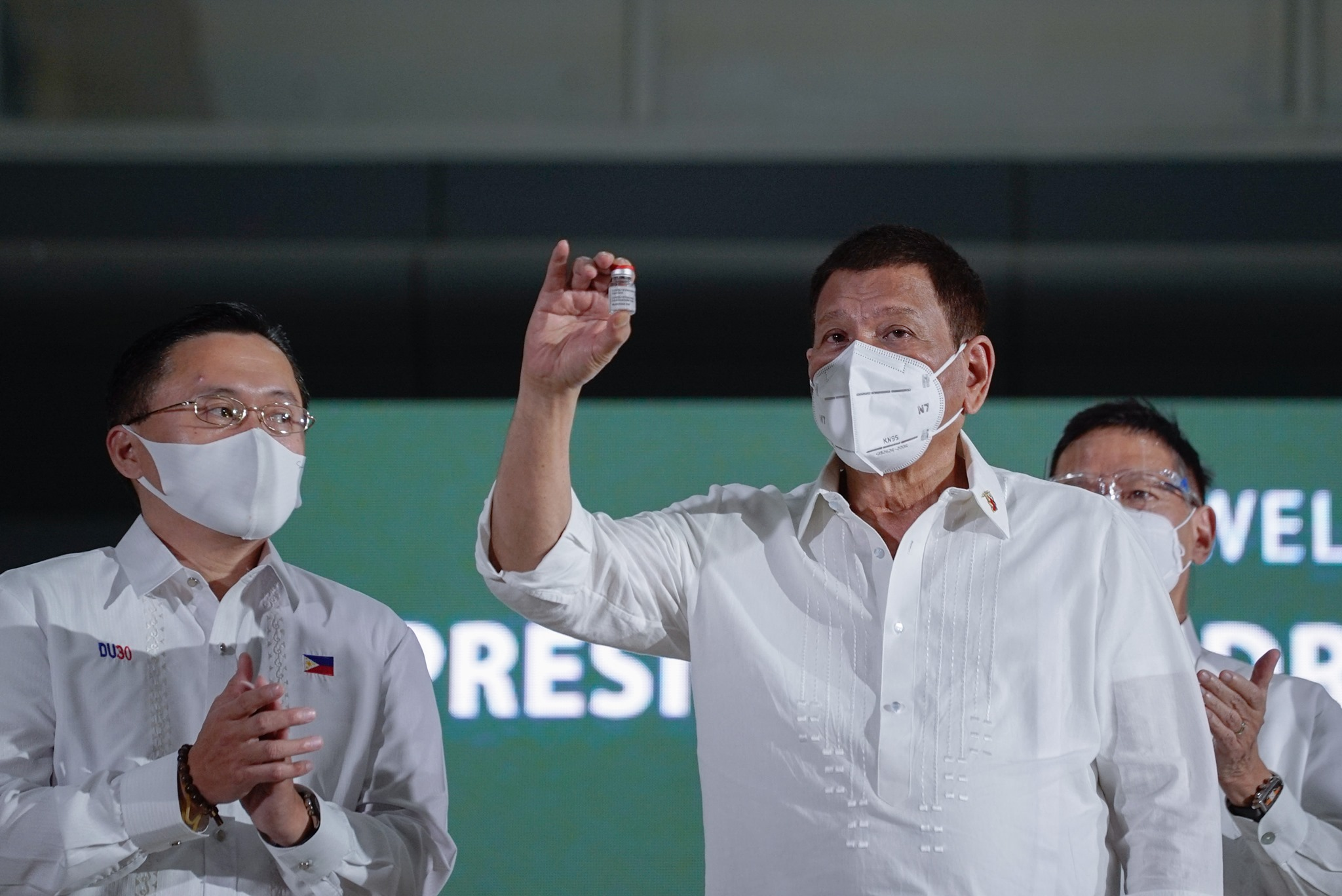
Duterte shows an AstraZeneca-developed COVID-19 vaccine vial following a ceremonial turnover in Pasay City on March 4, 2021.

At the height of the pandemic in mid-2021, the Philippines was a COVID-19 hotspot in Asia; vaccine hesitancy was a problem, and many citizens opted to wait for Western vaccines to arrive. In exasperation, Duterte urged the public to undergo vaccination, threatening to arrest unvaccinated individuals and order local leaders to compile a list of defiant residents. In May 2021, to encourage the public that vaccines were safe, Duterte—acting on the advice of his doctor—publicly took the Sinopharm BIBP vaccine before it was approved for use by the Philippine Food and Drug Administration; his move, however, drew criticism since the general public had access to CoronaVac vaccines, which the public majority perceived to have lower efficacy. The backlash prompted Duterte to apologize, acknowledge the possibility of the Sinopharm vaccine's multiple side effects, and decide to pull out the vaccines. The public's prejudice against China's CoronaVac was later revealed in a Reuters 2024 report as the outcome of a US government-launched covert propaganda and disinformation campaign that aimed to erode the public's trust in China-developed vaccines.

Duterte gradually relaxed quarantine restrictions to revive the economy. Upon leaving office, Duterte's administration secured 245 million vaccine doses; about 70.5 million individuals had been fully vaccinated. Over 3.7 million COVID-19 cases were recorded since the onset of the pandemic, 3.69 million people had recovered from the disease, while 8,706 active cases remained. Though his administration successfully reached its target of vaccinating 70% of the Philippine population, Duterte, along with Health Secretary Francisco Duque III, was implicated in a scandal involving allegedly overpriced medical supplies and equipment. Critics highlighted that Duterte's administration purchased pandemic supplies from Pharmally Pharmaceutical, a company linked to Duterte's former economic adviser, Michael Yang. Duterte rejected the corruption allegations and emphasized that the supplies at the time of purchase were in high demand, hence, the high prices. A Senate probe, headed by Senate Blue Ribbon Committee chairman Richard Gordon, was initiated in August 2021 for alleged irregularities in the use of COVID-19 response funds amounting to ₱67 billion. A month before Duterte left office, Gordon released a draft report on the probe, which claimed that Duterte "betrayed public trust" for appointing Yang as economic adviser in 2018, prohibited his Cabinet and other officials from attending the hearings, and allegedly discredited the Senate and Commission on Audit. The report, however, failed to reach the Senate plenary for deliberation after it was signed by nine senators out of the 11 required signatures.

==== Energy and climate ====
The Duterte administration initially adopted a "technology neutral" policy in energy generation. Earlier in his term, Duterte stressed that coal remains the most viable source of energy if the Philippines is to accelerate industrialization, and questioned the sanctions imposed by the United States and European Union on smaller countries including the Philippines when the country's carbon footprint is not significant compared to the superpowers.

The administration shifted its energy policy to prefer renewable sources of energy later in Duterte's term. At his fourth State of the Nation address in July 2019, Duterte issued an order to cut coal dependence and hasten a transition to renewable energy. In October 2020, the energy department issued a moratorium on the construction of new coal power plants and favored renewable energy sources. On February 28, 2022, Duterte issued an executive order approving the inclusion of nuclear power in the country's energy mix.

To hasten the expansion of the nation's power capacity, Duterte established the inter-agency Energy Investment Coordinating Council tasked with simplifying and streamlining the approval process of big-ticket projects. On January 21, 2022, he signed a law promoting the use of microgrid systems in unserved and underserved areas to accelerate total electrification of the country. The administration made initiatives to liberalize the energy sector, allowing 100% foreign ownership in large-scale geothermal projects starting October 2020.

Duterte signed the Paris Agreement on Climate Change in March 2017, after initially having misgivings about the deal which he says might limit the country's industrialization. The Agreement was ratified by the Senate on March 15, 2017. Duterte said that rich countries producing the most carbon emissions must pay smaller countries for damage caused by climate change.

==== Government streamlining ====
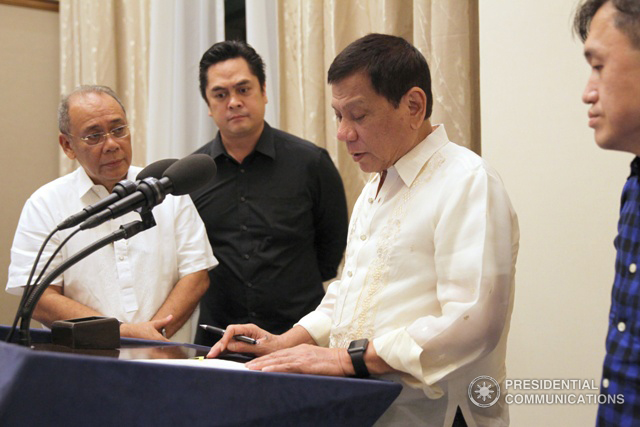
Duterte signs the Freedom of Information executive order in Davao City on July 24, 2016.

Duterte introduced reforms to eliminate red tape in the government, and ordered government agencies to remove all processes which are "redundant or burdensome" to the public. Three weeks after assuming office, he issued his second executive order establishing Freedom of Information, allowing citizens to obtain documents and records from public offices under the executive branch to promote transparency in the government.

In May 2018, Duterte signed the Ease of Doing Business Act which aims to create a better business environment by reducing processing time, cutting bureaucratic red tape, and eliminating corrupt practices in all government agencies. In December 2020, he enacted a law authorizing the president to expedite the processing and issuance of national and local permits, licenses, and certifications, by suspending its requirements, in times of national emergency.

Duterte institutionalized the 8888 Citizens' Complaint Hotline in October 2016, allowing the public to report complaints on poor government front-line services and corrupt practices in all government agencies.

==== Health care ====
Duterte vowed to improve the health care system, certifying the Universal Healthcare Bill as an urgent measure as early as July 2018. In February 2019, he signed the Universal Health Care Act, which automatically enrolls all Filipinos under the government's health insurance program. He also enacted the National Integrated Cancer Control Act which establishes a "national integrated" program to control and prevent cancer by making treatment more accessible and affordable, and the Philippine Mental Health Law, which provides free mental health services down to the barangay level while requiring hospitals to provide psychiatric, psychosocial and neurologic services.

In December 2019, Duterte signed a law institutionalizing Malasakit Centers in all hospitals run by the Department of Health, allowing indigent patients to efficiently access financial medical assistance from various government agencies.

Duterte ordered the full implementation of the Reproductive Health Law, banned smoking in public places nationwide, and set a price cap on select medicines.

==== Education ====
Duterte signed the Universal Access to Quality Tertiary Education Act in August 2017, providing free college education in all state universities and colleges nationwide. He signed a law establishing transnational higher education in the country, allowing foreign universities to offer degree programs in the Philippines in an effort to bring international quality standards and expertise into the country. He also signed medical scholarships for deserving students in state universities and colleges or partner private higher education institutions through the Doktor Para sa Bayan Act on December 23, 2020.

Duterte approved in January 2021 a law institutionalizing the alternative learning system (ALS), providing free education to those out of school. In March 2022, he enacted a law granting inclusive education for learners with disabilities.

On June 9, 2020, Duterte signed a law establishing the country's first National Academy of Sports in New Clark City, Capas, Tarlac.

=== Foreign policy ===
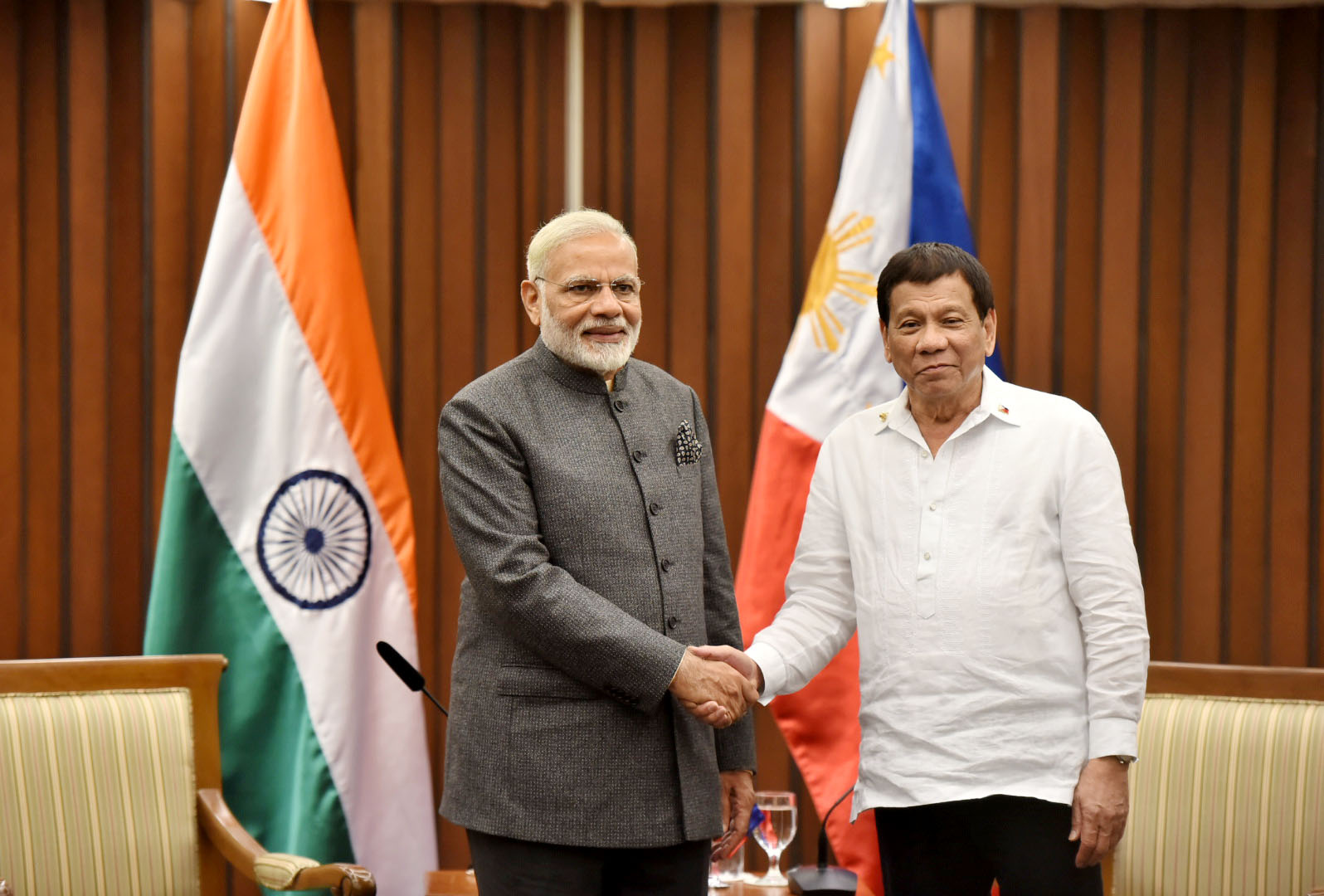
Duterte with Indian Prime Minister Narendra Modi in Pasay, November 2017

The Duterte administration has vowed to pursue what it describes as an "independent foreign policy" that would reject any meddling by foreign governments, reiterating Article II, Section 7 of the 1987 Constitution which states: "The State shall pursue an independent foreign policy. In its relations with other states the paramount consideration shall be national sovereignty, territorial integrity, national interest, and the right to self-determination." At a September 2016 press conference, Duterte stated: "We will observe and must insist on the time-honored principle of sovereignty, sovereign equality, non-interference and the commitment of peaceful settlements of dispute that will serve our people and protect the interests of our country."

Duterte made his first international trips as president to Vientiane, Laos and Jakarta, Indonesia on September 5–9, 2016.

Duterte pursued improved relations with China and Russia, and lessened the country's dependence on its traditional ally – the United States. He has adopted a cautious, pragmatic, and conciliatory stance towards China compared to his predecessor, and has set aside the previous administration's confrontational policy of asserting the Philippines' claims over the South China Sea and its islands.

Militant groups decry the ties between President Duterte and China over the Chinese occupation of contested waters and the reported harassment of the fishermen amidst the territorial disputes in the South China Sea. Also, while the United States is one of the countries critical to Philippine drug war campaign, most of the militant groups – particularly left-wing groups – also criticize Philippine-US relations due to the United States' "imperialism" and neoliberal policies.

=== Administration and cabinet ===
On May 31, 2016, a few weeks before his presidential inauguration, Duterte named his Cabinet, which consisted of former military generals, childhood friends, classmates, and leftist politicians. Following his presidential inauguration, he administered a mass oath-taking for his Cabinet officials, and held his first Cabinet meeting on June 30. He appointed his long-time personal aide Bong Go as Special Assistant to the President to provide general supervision to the Presidential Management Staff.

=== 2022 Philippine presidential election ===
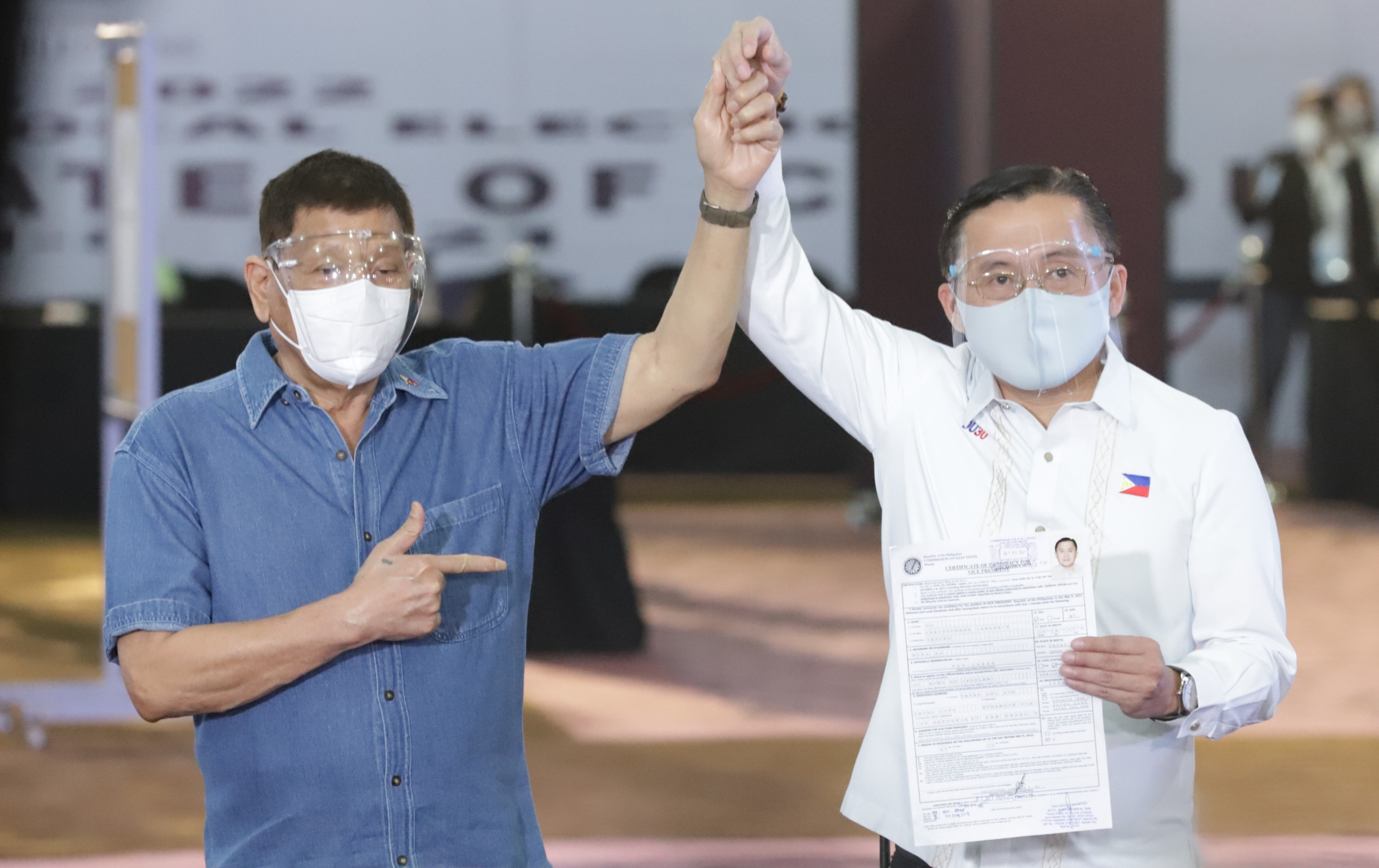
Duterte (left) endorses Bong Go, who filed his certificate of candidacy for vice president on October 2, 2021.

Initially stating that he "sees nobody deserving" to replace him as the next president, Duterte in August 2021 announced he would run for vice president in the upcoming 2022 national elections, drawing suspicions from critics that he would extend his term. Duterte's political party, the PDP–Laban Cusi faction, named its standard bearer: former Philippine National Police chief and Senator Ronald dela Rosa, who was widely suspected to be a placeholder for Duterte's daughter, Davao City mayor Sara. Duterte later withdrew his candidacy, announced his retirement from politics, and had his long-time aide, Senator Bong Go, substitute him.

Despite polls showing she was the preferred candidate for presidency, Sara decided to settle for the vice presidential race. This prompted dela Rosa to withdraw his candidacy, which Go would later fill in. Sara's move had Duterte dismayed and he initially retracted his planned retirement, announcing he would run for vice president. Ultimately, he decided not to face his daughter, endorsed a Go–Sara tandem, and declared his intent on running as Senator. However, Sara decided to run in tandem with Bongbong Marcos, who announced his presidential candidacy. Stating his heart and mind contradicted his actions, Go later withdrew his presidential candidacy; shortly after, Duterte officially withdrew his senate bid.

Duterte in November 2021 describes presidential aspirant Bongbong Marcos as a cocaine user and "very weak leader".

Due to his high popularity, Duterte remained influential before the national elections as several presidential candidates were open to his endorsement. As the Cusi faction was left without a standard bearer following Go's withdrawal, allies of Duterte endorsed different candidates. The Cusi faction eventually endorsed presidential candidate Marcos and some officials called for Duterte to do the same. Stressing he would remain neutral, Duterte refused to heed their calls and insisted on endorsing only Sara as vice president and 17 senatorial candidates. Additionally, in an effort to protect their integrity, Duterte barred his Cabinet members from campaigning for any candidate. Despite non-endorsement, Duterte hinted on the next president's preferred qualities: decisive, compassionate, a good judge of a person, and preferably, a lawyer; this led a PDP-Laban official to believe Duterte gave a "virtual endorsement" for Vice President Leni Robredo, who was Marcos' chief rival in the presidential race. In March 2022, Go said Duterte briefly met with Marcos and gave him advice on the presidency, but could not say whether Duterte gave Marcos an endorsement.

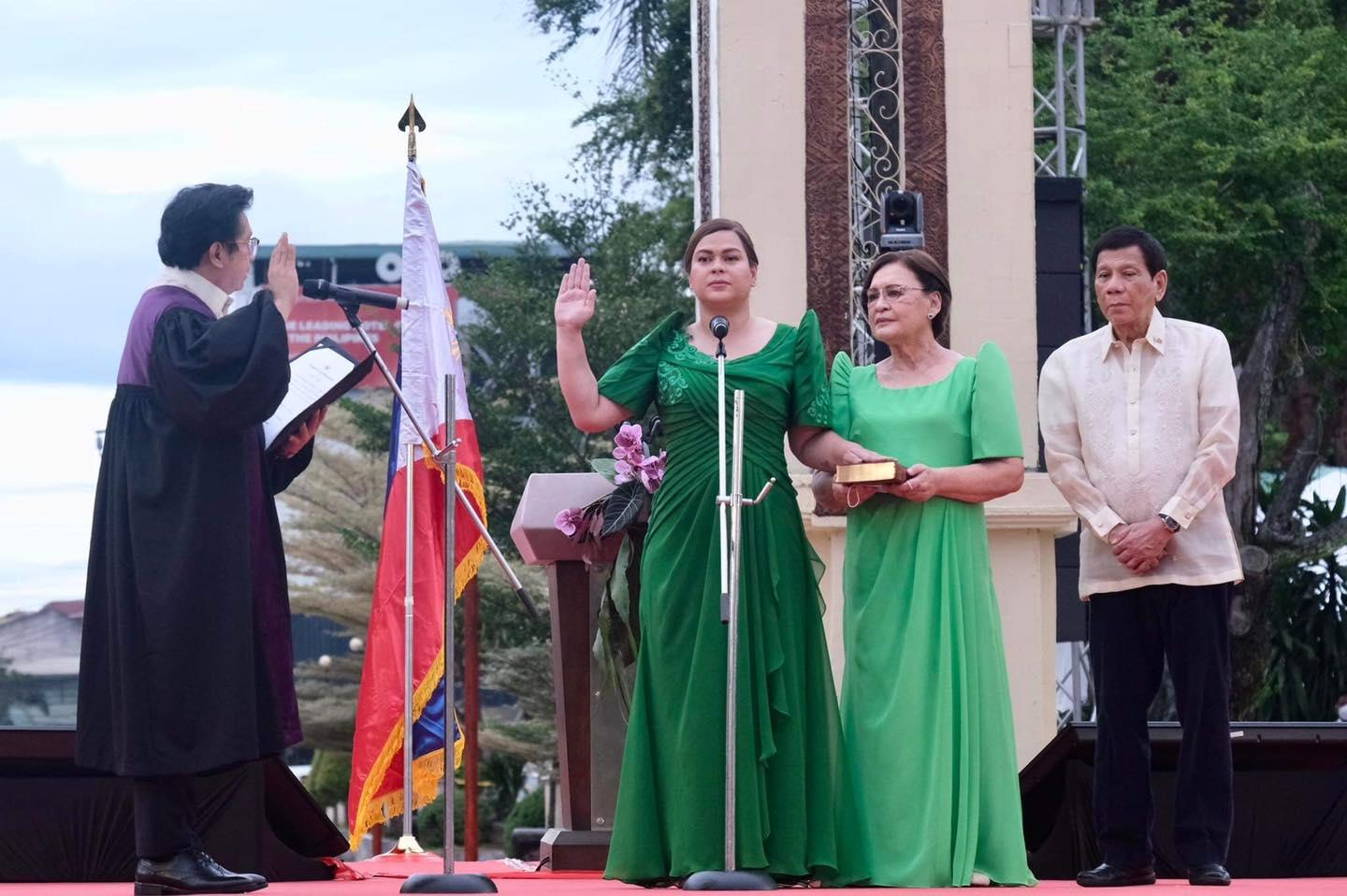
Duterte (right) witnesses Sara's oath of office as vice president in Davao City on June 19, 2022.

By May 5, 2022, Duterte created a transition committee led by Executive Secretary Salvador Medialdea to oversee the transition of power to the next administration. Several analysts believe Duterte had his popularity "inherited" by Marcos and Sara, who both won landslides in the election.

=== Impeachment efforts ===
On March 16, 2017, opposition politician Gary Alejano filed an impeachment complaint against Duterte citing thousands of deaths in Duterte's anti-drug campaign, alleged leadership of vigilante group Davao Death Squad, and allegations of graft and corruption. Alejano, on March 30, filed a supplemental complaint over Duterte's alleged inaction and "defeatist stance" in the South China Sea, Scarborough Shoal, and Benham Rise. On May 15, the House Justice Committee officially dismissed the charge by unanimous vote due to insufficient evidence after Alejano said he had no personal knowledge of the alleged offenses, having based his impeachment complaint on news reports and witness testimonies.

== Post-presidency (2022–present) ==
At the end of his presidency, Duterte returned to Davao City and kept a low profile. Former President Gloria Macapagal-Arroyo, a political ally of Duterte, convinced him in September 2023 to participate in the Philippine political landscape. In January 2023, Duterte resumed hosting his weekly show, Gikan sa Masa, Para sa Masa (From the Masses, For The Masses), on SMNI; co-hosted by Duterte's friend and spiritual adviser Pastor Apollo Quiboloy, Duterte would speak about current political issues besetting the country. Some of Duterte's strong statements in the show, such as his opposition to the expansion of the Enhanced Defense Cooperation Agreement (EDCA) sites in the Philippines, attracted attention and were covered by the media.

=== 2023 visit to China ===
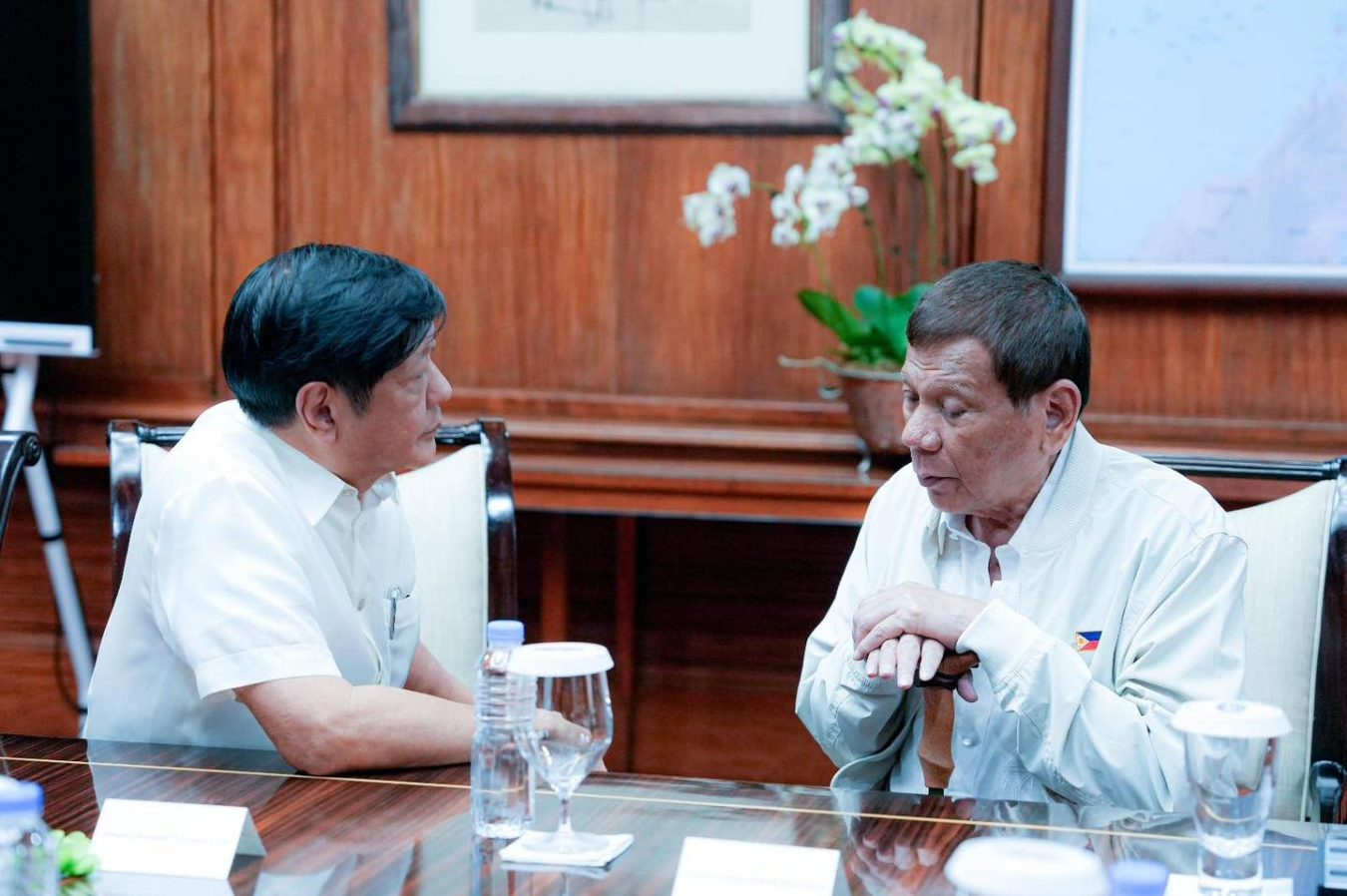
Duterte and President Bongbong Marcos meet in Malacañang Palace on August 2, 2023.

In July 2023, amid escalating tensions in the South China Sea, Chinese President Xi Jinping invited Duterte to Beijing. During the meeting, Xi asked Duterte to "play an important role" in improving Philippine-China relations, which were rapidly deteriorating under the Marcos administration that sought to gravitate towards the United States by expanding the number of bases American troops can access under the EDCA. As the meeting did not involve the Marcos administration, the event gained much attention, and the administration wanted details of the Xi-Duterte discussion. Duterte visited Malacanang Palace later and, in a closed-door session, discussed the matter with Marcos, though no further details were provided to the media.

=== Feud with the House and Marcos-Duterte rift ===
A rift between the Duterte and Marcos families had begun under House Speaker Martin Romualdez' leadership. In the House of Representatives, unconfirmed reports of Deputy House Speaker Gloria-Macapagal Arroyo allegedly attempting to unseat Romualdez as House Speaker circulated. Despite Arroyo dismissing the accusations, Arroyo was later demoted by the House from her senior deputy Speaker position.

Duterte's daughter, Vice President and Education Secretary Sara, subsequently resigned from the Romualdez-led Lakas-CMD and, in a veiled reference to Romualdez, called him a "tambaloslos" (A term that can be interpreted as a joke or as an insult, depending on context). In October 2023, Sara requested Congress for the allocation of confidential funds for the office of the vice president (OVP) and the education department which can be used for the Reserve Officers' Training Corps program. Her requests came under intense scrutiny by the Senate and the House, which was dominated by Romualdez's allies. Congress ultimately rejected her appeals while swiftly approving the confidential funds of the Office of the President; Sara eventually dropped her requests, reasoning that the move was being "divisive".

In the aftermath of events, Duterte criticized the House for denying his daughter's confidential funds; alleging a collusion between Romualdez and the left-wing Makabayan bloc, he demanded an audit of the House under Romualdez. Duterte's comments offended some House members including Romualdez, prompting the House to issue a loyalty check resolution in support of Romualdez; Duterte's political allies, Gloria Macapagal-Arroyo and Congressman Isidro Ungab, were later expelled by the House from their Deputy House Speaker positions for failing to sign the House resolution. Several House members also pledged support for Romualdez, including a majority of members of Duterte's political party, PDP-Laban, who switched parties mostly to the Romualdez-led Lakas-CMD. After ACT Teachers Representative France Castro of the Makabayan Bloc pushed to remove the OVP and education department's confidential funds, Duterte urged Sara to reveal the use of such funds, which included the supposed killing of communists such as Castro. In response, Castro filed a legal case against Duterte for labeling her as a communist rebel and allegedly threatening her life; Castro's legal case was later denied by the Quezon City Prosecutor's Office due to insufficient evidence.

=== SMNI suspension and ICC investigation ===
Despite sustained domestic popularity, Duterte found himself increasingly politically isolated. SMNI, which hosted his talk show Gikan sa Masa, Para sa Masa, was later suspended (first for 30 days, and later indefinitely) by the National Telecommunications Commission on grounds of alleged dissemination of fake information. Gikan was also suspended after ACT Teachers Representative France Castro filed a complaint against Duterte for allegedly threatening her life during one of the shows. Duterte initially intended to speak to Marcos about the SMNI suspension issue as it has affected his talk show, decrying the suspension as censorship. Additionally, the Liberal Party, who opposed Marcos' 2022 presidential campaign, were increasingly silent in criticizing the Marcos administration, instead, directing criticism at Duterte and his daughter, Vice President Sara. Duterte and his former aide, Senator Bong Go, also faced alleged plunder charges initiated in July 2024 by Duterte's staunch critic, former Senator Antonio Trillanes.

Political analysis noted that the Marcos administration subtly shifted its approach toward controversies involving Duterte. Despite Marcos' early assurance of the Philippines' non-cooperation on the looming International Criminal Court (ICC) investigation on Duterte's war on drugs, conflicting statements and moves by House Speaker Romualdez, the House, Marcos' Justice Secretary Crispin Remulla and Solicitor General Menardo Guevarra muddled the administration's official stance. In addition, Marcos limited his position on the matter through oral statements and avoided issuing an executive order formalizing his stance. There were also unconfirmed reports, including by former Senator Antonio Trillanes, stating that ICC members had already entered the Philippines and were already secretly conducting the investigation. A House probe initiated in April 2024 by Romualdez into a "status quo" agreement in the South China Sea Duterte made during his presidency with Chinese president Xi Jinping was also seen as a "political payback" to Duterte's verbal attacks on Marcos and diminish Duterte's political influence ahead of the 2025 midterm elections. Amidst growing isolation, Duterte found allies who were previously loyal to Marcos. Among them were Marcos' longtime lawyer, Vic Rodriguez, who served as executive secretary in Marcos' first 79 days before resigning; and Marcos' sister, Senator Imee Marcos.

On March 11, 2025, Duterte was arrested upon his arrival at Ninoy Aquino International Airport by the Filipino police, which enforced an arrest warrant issued by the International Criminal Court.

=== Quiboloy's arrest order and Duterte as KOJC administrator ===
On March 9, 2024, Duterte's longtime friend and Kingdom of Jesus Christ leader, Pastor Apollo Quiboloy, was ordered arrested by the United States Federal Bureau of Investigation after his conviction by a US District Court for alleged cases of sex trafficking, rape, fraud, and cash smuggling. No extradition request was received by the Marcos administration for Quiboloy's arrest, although a probe in the Senate was previously initiated on January 23 by Senator Risa Hontiveros, who invited Quiboloy to attend the hearings. Quiboloy demanded a fair trial as a requirement to attend, though this was rebuked by Hontiveros and Marcos. Claiming his life was under threat through what he described as a connivance between Marcos and the US government, Quiboloy went into hiding and designated Duterte as administrator of his ministry's properties. After Quiboloy refused to attend the hearings, Hontiveros cited him in contempt and recommended the Senate President to order his arrest. Arrest orders for Quiboloy were issued by the Pasig Regional Trial Court despite the efforts of Senators Robin Padilla, Cynthia Villar, and Bong Go to oppose the move. Four separate raids were eventually held in Quiboloy's properties in Davao City; though Quiboloy was not found, the raids were criticized by Duterte and his allies for its "excessive [and] unnecessary force" involving several units of police and military personnel "in full battle gear". KOJC members gathered in a rally in Liwasang Bonifacio calling for justice for Quiboloy.

=== "Hakbang ng Maisug" rallies ===
Additional nationwide protests, called Hakbang ng Maisug (brave) prayer rallies, were held in Dumaguete, Tagum, and Angeles by Duterte and Quiboloy's supporters, who voiced their grievances against the Marcos administration. Particularly among these grievances included their opposition to proposed constitutional amendments and to the increased US military presence in the country, as well as denouncement of perceived censorship under the administration. In one of the rallies, Duterte notably accused Marcos of plotting to extend his term beyond the current term limit of the Constitution and of being a drug addict, to which Marcos responded by alleging Duterte's previous use of fentanyl as painkiller impaired his judgment; Duterte later dared Marcos to undergo a drug test with him at Luneta Park.

Frustrated on the administration's use of taxpayers' money, Duterte initially revived calls advocated by former House Speaker Pantaleon Alvarez for Mindanao to secede from the Philippines; his calls drew disapproval from several lawmakers and former Muslim rebels, prompting Duterte to later retract his calls, saying he only wanted "a better deal for Mindanao". Despite success in holding some rallies, a few suffered setbacks and cancellations after the rally venues were allegedly blocked by the Marcos administration, drawing condemnation from Duterte and his allies. Despite his criticisms against Marcos, Duterte clarified the prayer rallies were not meant to overthrow the administration but warned Marcos of extending his six-year term, reminding Marcos of his father's fate.

=== 2025 elections ===
On October 5, 2024, Duterte announced that he will run for mayor of Davao City, with his son, incumbent Mayor Sebastian Duterte, as his running mate for vice mayor in 2025. He also rejected calls for him to run for senator, citing his old age. Duterte officially filed his candidacy on October 7; however, on November 7, he welcomed the candidacy of his former cabinet secretary, former Civil Service Commission chairperson Karlo Nograles as Davao City mayor, adding he is retired and wishes to give the position to the next generation.

In May 2025, Duterte was elected as mayor despite his detention at The Hague by the ICC. However, he was unable to take his oath on the start of his term on June 30, 2025, due to his imprisonment. As a result, his son Sebastian, who was elected vice mayor, became acting mayor. On January 23, 2026, Sebastian was sworn in as mayor of Davao City, following his father's failure to take the oath of office within the six-month prescribed period due to his detention.

=== House and Senate probe into the war on drugs ===
Duterte takes "full, legal responsibility" for the actions of the police who he said merely followed his orders, during the Senate Blue Ribbon Committee hearing on October 28, 2024.

Duterte during the House probe on the war on drugs on November 13, 2024

In October 2024, the House quad committee led an investigation into the supposed use of intelligence funds to fund an alleged "reward system" for police involved in drug-related extrajudicial killings that occurred during Duterte's presidency. Among the witnesses in the House probe was former Philippine Charity Sweepstakes Office general manager and retired Police Colonel Royina Garma, who accused Duterte of wanting to apply his Davao model approach of the war on drugs on a national scale. Senators Ronald dela Rosa and Bong Go, dismissing the reward money claims as baseless accusations and hearsay, launched a parallel probe in the Senate to "find out the truth". Responding to the Senate invitation, Duterte attended the Senate probe into his campaign against illegal drugs. During the session, Duterte admitted to using a "death squad" to combat crime as Davao mayor, but denied directing extrajudicial killings in his national drug war, now being examined by the ICC. He further noted the resumption of activities of drug dealers and criminals after he stepped down from presidency, telling them "If I'm given another chance, I'll wipe all of you".

My mandate as president of the republic was to protect the country and the Filipino people. Do not question my policies because I offer no apologies, no excuses. I did what I had to do.

— Duterte, October 28, 2024

Duterte accepted an invitation to the House quad committee hearing on November 13. During the hearing, he reiterated the tough but necessary decisions he took in his anti-drug campaign. He further said he was not scared of the ICC and expressed impatience for the ICC's investigation, saying "I am already old, I might die soon. You might miss the pleasure of seeing me standing before the court hearing the judgement whatever it is". In a significant reversal of position, Marcos' executive secretary Lucas Bersamin later stated the Marcos administration "will feel obliged to consider" a red notice from the Interpol for Duterte should it be issued.

=== Impeachment of Sara Duterte ===
In December 2024, Duterte offered to join the defense team of his daughter, Vice President Sara Duterte, against her impeachment. On February 18, 2025, two weeks after the vice president was impeached by the House of Representatives, Duterte was listed as the legal counsel of his daughter in her Supreme Court petition to stop the impeachment from proceeding to trial.

=== Arrest and detention at the International Criminal Court ===
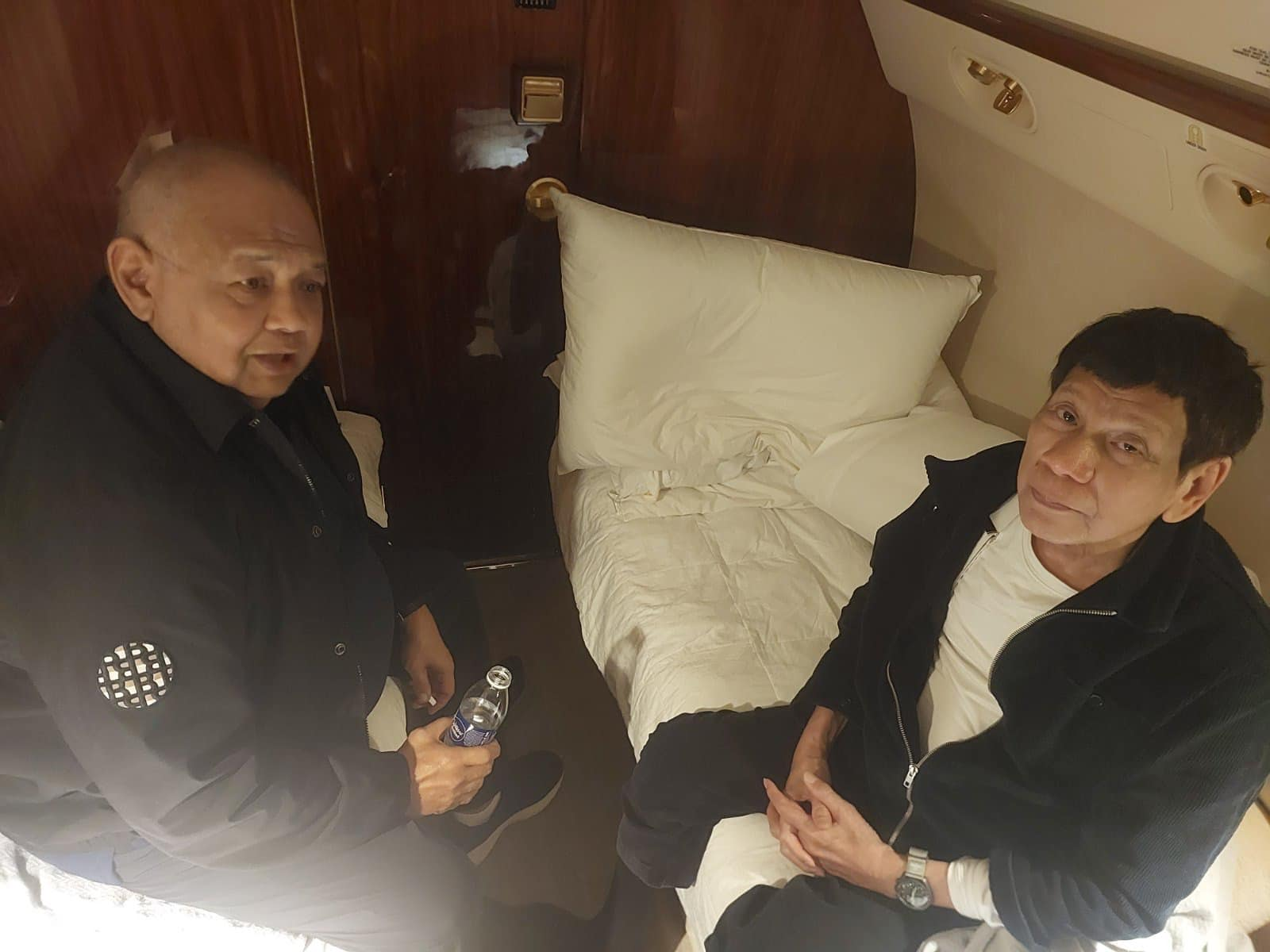
Following his arrest, Duterte was accompanied by Salvador Medialdea on the flight to The Hague into ICC custody

On March 7, 2025, Duterte left for Hong Kong alongside Honeylet Avanceña, his daughter Veronica and his entourage. Although his lawyer Salvador Panelo said that his purpose of travel was to attend a KOJC-organized campaign sortie for Partido Demokratiko Pilipino among overseas Filipino workers, his departure coincided with reports that the release of an arrest warrant for Duterte from the International Criminal Court (ICC) was imminent. Others who attended the event include Duterte's daughter, Vice President Sara Duterte, Senators Ronald dela Rosa and Bong Go, and senatorial candidates Rodante Marcoleta and Vic Rodriguez.

On March 11, 2025, upon his return from Hong Kong on a commercial flight, Duterte was arrested at Ninoy Aquino International Airport for crimes against humanity of murder, torture, and rape. The warrant was issued by the ICC, but coursed through Interpol. A top official of the Marcos administration earlier said that the government would honor its commitments to Interpol if an arrest warrant was issued, despite its policy of not cooperating with the ICC. Duterte questioned the warrant's legitimacy, asserting that the arrest did not follow standard procedures and that any prosecution should occur within the Philippines. His supporters rallied in major cities condemning the arrest, while activists hailed the arrest as a pivotal moment for justice. He was soon surrendered to the ICC in The Hague, Netherlands, where he was being held as of 11 March 2025.

The indictment against Duterte, which was made public on September 22, 2025, accused him of involvement in the murders of 76 people between 2013 and 2018. Fifty-seven of the killings took place during his presidency, and the other 19 occurred during his third term as mayor of Davao City. On October 10, 2025, the ICC rejected a request from Duterte to be released from detention, arguing that he posed a risk of fleeing and would not be willing to return for trial, as well as presenting concerns about potential witness intimidation if he were granted freedom. On January 26, 2026, the ICC declared Duterte fit for trial, overruling efforts by his lawyers to have the charges dismissed on health grounds. Duterte waived his right to appear at any proceedings, with his lawyer Nicholas Kaufman stating that he was not mentally fit to follow the hearing. On April 23, 2026, the Pre-Trial Chamber of the ICC committed Duterte to trial.

In May 2026, the ICC Pre-Trial Chamber I denied Duterte's appeal to dismiss the charges. That same month the Trial Chamber III of the ICC set the opening statements in Duterte's trial to begin on November 30, 2026. On September 3, 2026, his defense asked the ICC to verify digital evidence presented by the prosecution, saying that much of the material against Duterte had been taken from open-source and user-generated content from the internet.

== Public image ==
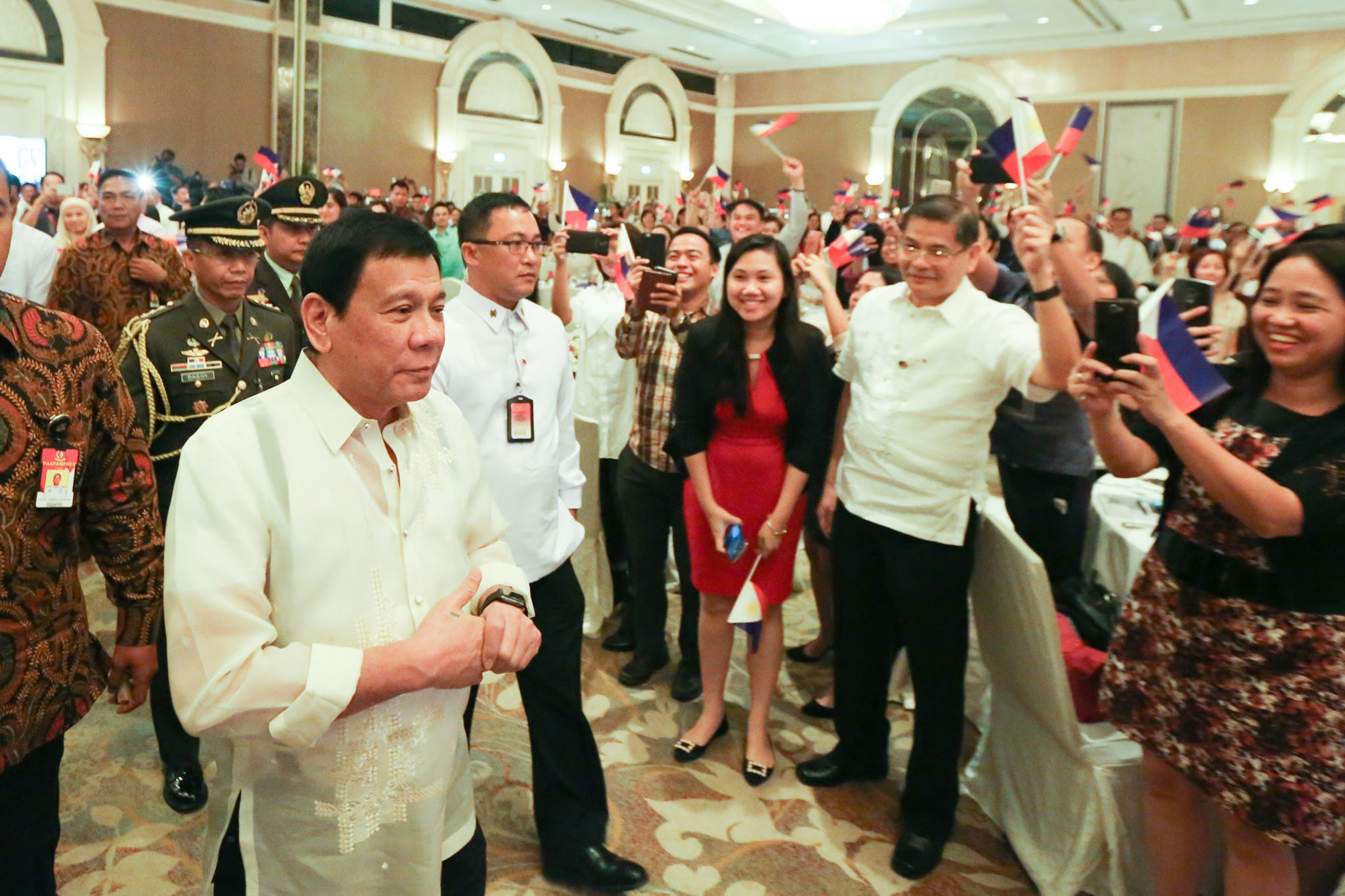
Duterte meets with the Filipino community in Jakarta, September 9, 2016.

Ardent supporters of Duterte have been labeled as "Diehard Duterte Supporters", alternatively known as "Digong Duterte Supporters", which shares the acronym with the Davao Death Squad (DDS). This label has been applied to the 16 million people who voted for him in the 2016 presidential election.

Duterte developed a reputation as a "protector" and "savior" in his hometown of Davao City as mayor of the city for more than two decades. This is despite reports of death squads in the city.

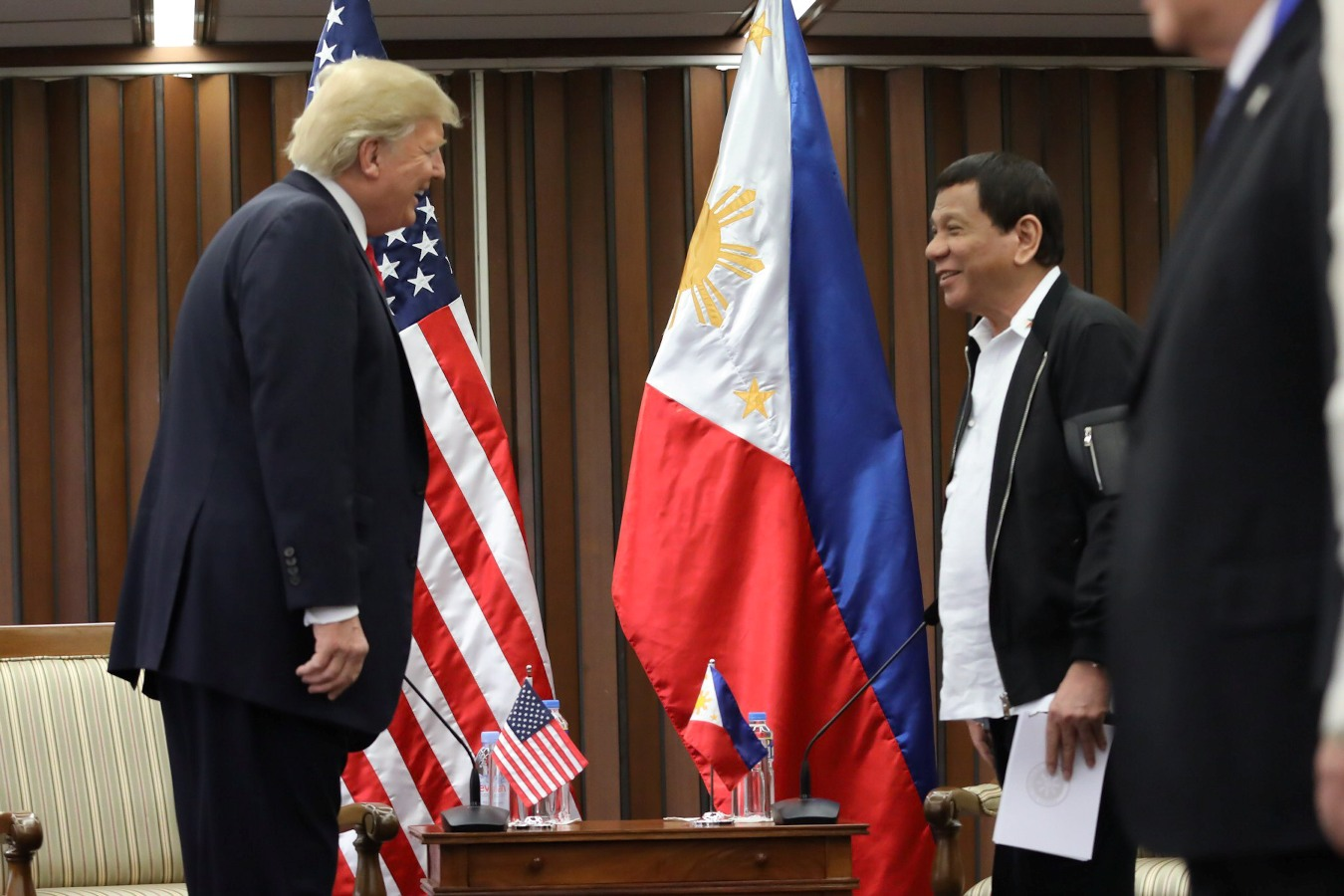
Duterte with US President Donald Trump in Pasay, Metro Manila, November 2017

Duterte has been described as a populist, with his foul-mouthed remarks against the country's elite which positioned him as a "man of the people" and was critical to his victory in the 2016 presidential election. He has also been compared to U.S. President Donald Trump for his rhetorical style.

Duterte and his administration have been criticized for his anti-drug campaign, foreign policies, human rights record, extrajudicial killings during his term, political views, and controversial comments. Despite the criticisms on his administration, throughout his career, Duterte's remained hugely popular, attributed to his man-of-the-people style and a perception of strong leadership and success in fighting crime and corruption, while opponents reproach him for his authoritarian style and low tolerance of dissent. Analysts attribute his continued popularity to his emotional connection to the public, citing his charisma and humor, tough-talking manner, his image as a father figure as Tatay Digong (Father Digong), and Filipinos' general interest in strong leaders.

A Social Weather Stations study concluded that there are multiple reasons for Duterte's high satisfaction ratings in surveys; these include his strong base support, satisfaction with the administration's overall governance (pamamalakad) and with some policy issues which include helping the poor and the drug war, and his character. Poll respondents who relate to or are attracted to some aspects of his character, such as his perceived decisiveness and diligence tend to be satisfied. On the other hand, those who feel he is vulgar (bastos) tend to be less satisfied.

Despite keeping a low profile during his post-presidency, Duterte retained his popularity, topping four consecutive surveys conducted separately in March, June, September, and December 2023 by PUBLiCUS Asia on the voting disposition for 2025 Philippine Senate election.

=== Controversial remarks and human rights concerns ===
In 2015, Duterte made homophobic remarks about United States ambassador Philipp Goldberg after Secretary of State John Kerry visited the Philippines.

Duterte's record on human rights and his long history of comments that have widely been considered to be offensive, provocative, threatening, and undiplomatic have received sharp international criticism. He has been portrayed by his critics in the media as having a "dirty mouth". He had, however, promised to behave in a "prim and proper" manner on the national and international stage once he was to be inaugurated as president, to the point that, "almost, I would become holy."

Throughout his presidency, Duterte has made controversial comments about rape, human rights, his views on media killings, and has used slurs; he has also made controversial statements to international leaders and institutions. He has also repeatedly criticized the Catholic Church which has expressed alarm over deaths linked to the war on drugs.

Human Rights Watch (HRW) called the first year of Duterte in office a "human rights calamity". HRW estimates that there have been 7,000 deaths from the day Duterte first took office to January 2017. The Duterte administration suspended the drug war in February 2017 in an effort to cleanse the police ranks of supposed corruption, also halting the disclosure of figures on deaths related to drug arrests and raids. In March 2017, HRW released a special investigation and report on the state of police related shooting, titled "License To Kill". The New York Times had also released a video documentary "When A President Says I'll Kill You", which depicts Duterte's war on drugs through a local photographer's eyes. On August 17, 2017, HRW called Duterte a threat to the human rights community after he made threats against human rights activists.

=== Supporters ===
Several other Facebook groups with the acronym "DDS" supported Duterte as early as 2011. Among these groups is the Duterte Defense Squad, which was created on July 5, 2011. Other examples include Digong Duterte Supporters-Registered Nurses Group, Duterte's Destiny is to Serve the Country, Digong Duterte Swerte (lit. 'Digong Duterte is (Good) Luck'), and Davsur Duterte Supporters. In 2015, members of these groups urged Duterte to run for president.

=== Approval ratings ===
SWS Net satisfaction ratings of Rodrigo Duterte (September 2016–June 2022)
Date	Rating
Sep 2016	+64
Dec 2016	+63
Mar 2017	+63
Jun 2017	+66
Sep 2017	+48
Dec 2017	+58
Mar 2018	+56
Jun 2018	+45
Sep 2018	+54
Dec 2018	+60
Mar 2019	+66
Jun 2019	+68
Sep 2019	+65
Dec 2019	+72
Nov 2020	+79
May 2021	+65
Jun 2021	+62
Sep 2021	+52
Dec 2021	+60
Apr 2022	+65
Jun 2022	+81

Despite criticism and international opposition to his controversial anti-narcotics drive, Duterte's domestic approval rating remained relatively high throughout his presidency. Duterte began his presidency with a high trust rating of 79% and 91% (the highest of any Philippine official since 1999), from pollsters Social Weather Stations (SWS) and Pulse Asia, respectively. His net satisfaction rating reached its lowest at 45% in July 2018, attributed to inflation during the period as well as Duterte calling God "stupid" for the concept of original sin in the Bible; eventually, his satisfaction rating rose to 60% by the end of the year.

Halfway through his term, Duterte's approval rating reached 79%, the highest among his predecessors at this stage in their presidencies. It rose to 87% by the end of 2019 due to the successful hosting of the 2019 Southeast Asian Games as well as the administration's poverty reduction programs. Amid the COVID-19 pandemic, Pulse Asia reported in September 2020 that 84% of Filipinos approved of the administration's efforts to contain the virus and provide assistance to those who lost their jobs; 92% of the poll respondents also agreed Duterte had "done well" in preventing the contagion in the country. Duterte ended 2021 with an approval rating of 60%, wherein higher net satisfaction was observed among those who have been or are willing to get vaccinated.

Duterte maintained his high approval and trust ratings as he approached the end of his term. A 2021 poll by WR Numero Research revealed that 54.59% of voters want soft continuity of Duterte's policies, 29.57% want full continuity, while only 15.84% preferred change. Duterte left office with a net satisfaction rating of 81%, his highest in SWS polling. Additionally, polling firm PUBLiCUS Asia reported in Duterte's last month in office that Duterte received a 75% approval for his entire six-year tenure, making him the most popular post-EDSA president.

== Political positions ==
Duterte described himself as left-leaning during his campaign and presidency, but has stressed that he is for democracy and is not a communist. Some in the mainstream news media have labeled Duterte as a right-wing populist and authoritarian. He has been likened to other nationalist figures in the 2010s including Donald Trump and Jair Bolsonaro.

Duterte was a member of the leftist Kabataang Makabayan during the 1970s and was a student of prominent Philippine leftist figure and founder of the Communist Party of the Philippines, Jose Maria Sison. During a 1980s interview, Duterte expressed his frustration on seeing suspected criminals being acquitted despite evidence against them, further adding he admired the NPA's "brand of rendering swift justice".

His relationship with the communists deteriorated during his presidency due to continued rebel attacks on soldiers despite the peace talks. The collapse of the peace talks with the CPP, New People's Army (NPA) and NDF led to the falling-out between Duterte and the CPP. The dismissal of cabinet members, most of whom were dropped by the Commission on Appointments or by Duterte himself, led to his erstwhile progressive allies disowning him. The fallout between Duterte and the CPP has also been followed by the expansion of a historical and religiously informed cultural hostility toward left-wing politics in the Philippines, which had been previously reserved for the CPP but which has now spread to the social democratic, democratic socialist and national democratic organizations, such as the Makabayan bloc. Some national democrats and others who identify with the left have refuted Duterte's self-proclaimed socialist credentials given his inability to concretely and seriously tackle the economic aspects of liberalism.

== Personal life ==
Duterte is known for being an avid fan of large-displacement cruiser motorcycles, (Note: Known in local vernacular as "big bikes".) but detests luxury cars. He owns a Harley-Davidson Street and a Can-Am Spyder. He was once a habitual smoker, but he eventually quit after a doctor's suggestion due to health concerns. Duterte is an avid reader of Robert Ludlum and Sidney Sheldon novels. Duterte is also known for his straightforward and vocal attitude in public, especially in interviews, showing no hesitation in profusely using profanity live on-screen on numerous occasions despite formal requests by media groups and schools beforehand to abstain.

Duterte has his own local show in Davao City called Gikan sa Masa, para sa Masa ("From the Masses, For the Masses"), which formerly aired as a blocktimer on ABS-CBN Davao, and currently broadcast on SMNI News Channel since 2023. He is also a member of Lex Talionis Fraternitas, a fraternity based in the San Beda College of Law and the Ateneo de Davao University.

Aside from his native Cebuano, Duterte is also fluent in Filipino and English.

While criticizing political opponent Antonio Trillanes in a 2019 speech, Duterte claimed that he was once gay but had "cured himself" before meeting his wife Elizabeth Zimmerman.

Since being the mayor of Davao City, Duterte has held an annual tradition of visiting children with cancer in the city and giving them Christmas gifts.

Duterte is a self-proclaimed womanizer who had other women besides his former wife Elizabeth Zimmerman and current domestic partner Honeylet Avanceña. According to his son Paolo, the elder Duterte had 13 girlfriends based in Davao City. Sebastian only claims two other women besides Zimmerman and Avanceña.

=== Family ===
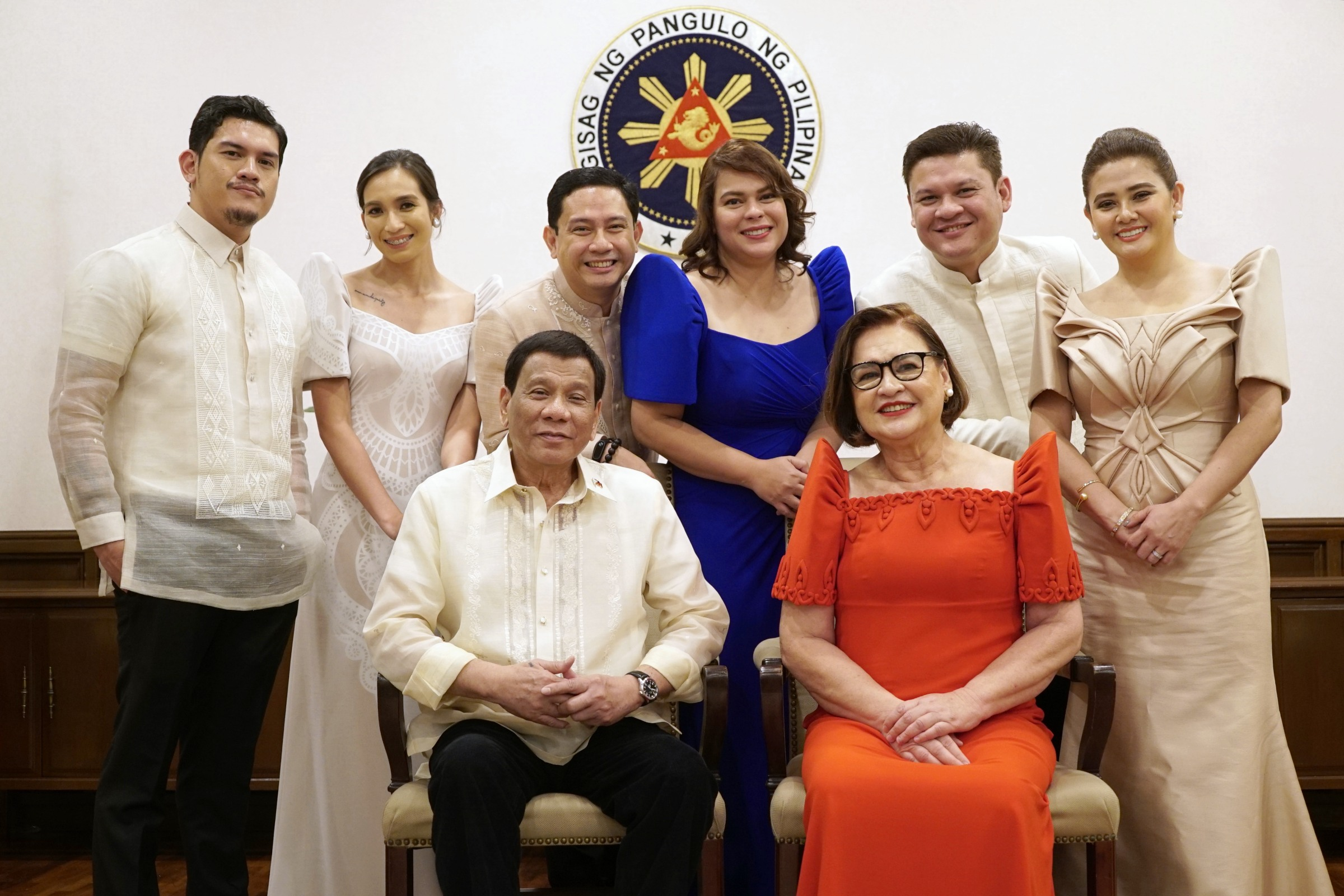
Duterte (seated, left) with his first family after delivering his third State of the Nation Address in 2018

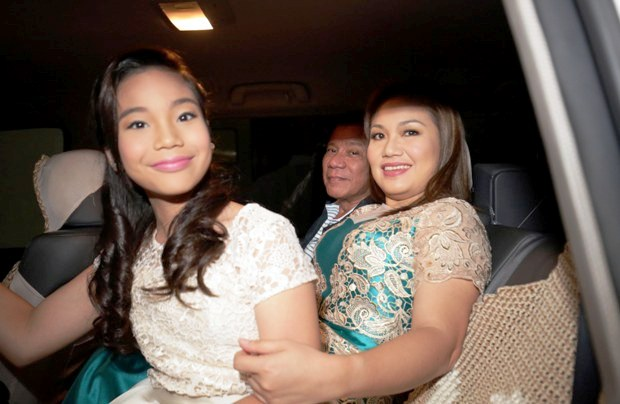
Duterte with Avanceña along with their daughter Veronica, about to be on their way to Malacañan for his inauguration and start of his presidency

Duterte's father, Vicente, died in 1968 while his mother, Soledad, died on February 4, 2012, at the age of 95.

In 1973, Duterte married Elizabeth Zimmerman, a flight attendant of German American descent who traces her roots in Tuburan, Cebu. They have three children (from eldest to youngest): Paolo ("Pulong"), Sara ("Inday Sara") and Sebastian ("Baste"). In the 1990s, his son Paolo left the family for more than five years after having a son (Omar Vincent) with Lovelie Sangkola in 1994, which Duterte acknowledged to be "[o]ne of my sad events in my life". Sara and Paolo both entered politics in 2007 and 2008 respectively, while Baste, with no interest in politics, initially concentrated on business and surfing but eventually ran and won as vice mayor of Davao City in 2019. Sara was elected as Vice President in 2022.

Duterte has been publicly open about his infidelity while married to Zimmerman and cited it as the reason for his failed marriage. According to newspaper columnist Ramon Tulfo, Duterte's various alleged partners included "a then agriculture undersecretary, a governor of a province, a local TV newscaster and a policewoman", with Duterte himself admitting in 2016 to having multiple girlfriends such as a cosmetics worker in a shopping mall and a cashier. In 1998, Zimmerman filed a petition in the Regional Trial Court of Pasig to nullify her marriage. Duterte never appeared in court and did not contest Zimmerman's petition. Two years later, the court decided in her favor, ending the 27-year marriage of Duterte and Zimmerman. Duterte and Zimmerman have been on good terms in recent years, with Zimmerman stating: "Yes, [Rodrigo] is really a very good leader. That is all he is. But when it comes to family, he is not capable of taking care of it." His daughter, Sara, characterized her family as "broken", calling her relationship with her father as "not very close" up to the time she became mayor in 2010.

Prior to his arrest, Duterte had been living with his common-law wife Cielito "Honeylet" Avanceña, a businesswoman and former nurse, with whom he has one daughter named Veronica ("Kitty"), an American by birth. Duterte has eleven grandchildren, half of whom are Muslims and the other half Christian, and two great-grandchildren. Since 2022, a child named Mira ("Mimi", born 2019) is seen being raised by Duterte and Avanceña alongside Veronica, though there are conflicting reports on whether she is a child or a grandchild of Duterte. Veronica attributes her rose tattoo to Mira.

On his paternal side, Duterte shares familial ties with some of the prominent families of the Visayas, particularly the Almendrases and Duranos of Danao, Cebu. (Note: Brothers Facundo & Severo Duterte both married women from Danao; Severo's daughter Beatriz married post-War business magnate Ramon M. Durano, Sr. Their descendants constitute the modern-day political family of the Duranos of Danao, Cebu. Ramon M. Durano, Sr.'s sister Elisea married Paulo Almendras, and their descendants constitute the modern-day Almendrases of Cebu. One of their descendants, Jose Rene Almendras is a former Secretary of the Department of Foreign Affairs (acting).) His distant uncle, former Senator Alejandro Almendras, was one of his original supporters when he first ran for mayor of Davao City in 1988.

=== Religion ===
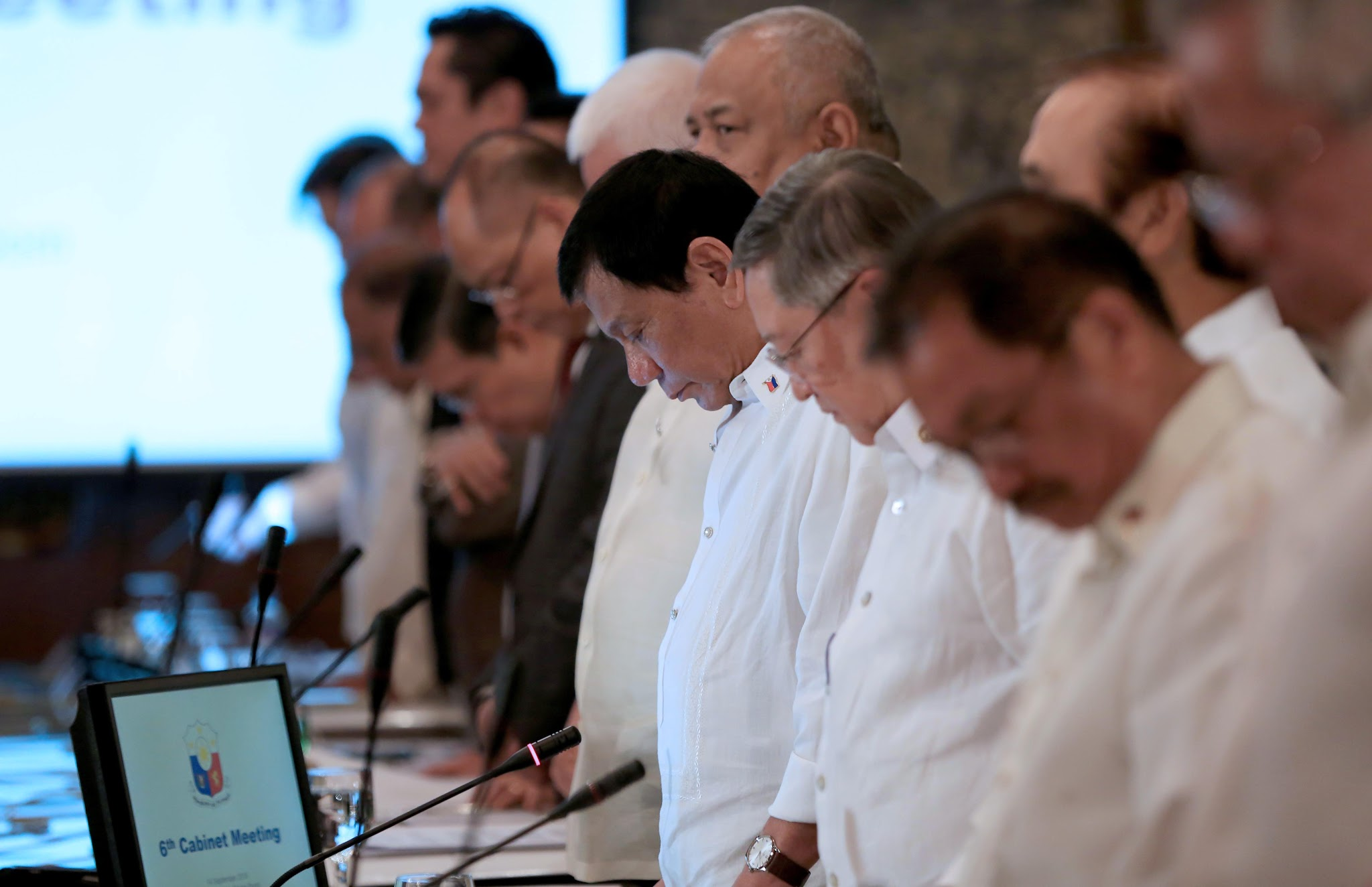
Duterte (center) and his cabinet members pray before the start of the 6th Cabinet Meeting on September 14, 2016.

Despite being raised as a communicant of the Catholic Church, on January 19, 2016, Duterte clarified that he had not attended Mass for quite some time already since he deemed it incompatible with his mayoral responsibilities: "If I listened to the Ten Commandments or to the priests," said Duterte, "I would not be able to do anything as a mayor." Duterte has described himself as Christian in 2016 and "spiritual" in 2018, expressing that he "can't accept" Catholicism or organized religion but also that he is neither an atheist nor an agnostic. He has referred to God as Allah and has been quoted as saying: "a part of me which is Islam".

During his presidency, Duterte and the Catholic Church in the Philippines exchanged frequent criticisms. In response to the rising death toll in Duterte's war on drugs, the Catholic Bishops' Conference of the Philippines (CBCP) in February 2017 issued a strongly worded pastoral letter which was read in church services; the letter highlighted that "[killing] is considered as normal", and "to consent and keep silent in front of evil is to be an accomplice to it". Duterte later lambasted Catholic bishops, telling them "not use the pulpit", reviling them as "sons of bitches", remarking that some of them are gay, and urging street bums to rob and kill them. Notable among the bishops Duterte criticized was Caloocan Bishop Pablo Virgilio David, a vocal critic of the Duterte administration's war on drugs. Duterte accused David of being involved in illegal drugs and stealing church donations, after which the CBCP came to David's defense and vouched for his integrity. Citing continued criticism from Catholic bishops, Duterte's verbal attacks on the Catholic Church escalated in mid-2018 to early 2019, during which he challenged the Catholic Church to show evidence of the existence of God, while expressing his belief in "one Supreme God" and "a universal mind somewhere which controls the universe". In one of his harshest vitriol in June 2018, he remarked that God was "stupid" for permitting the serpent to tempt Eve in the creation story in the Bible; though the controversial statement was later clarified by his spokesperson as Duterte's "personal opinion", it contributed to Duterte's quarterly approval rating dipping to its lowest at 45%. Efforts by the Church to rally public support against the administration's war on drugs, however, were less effective due to Duterte's domestic popularity and high trust ratings.

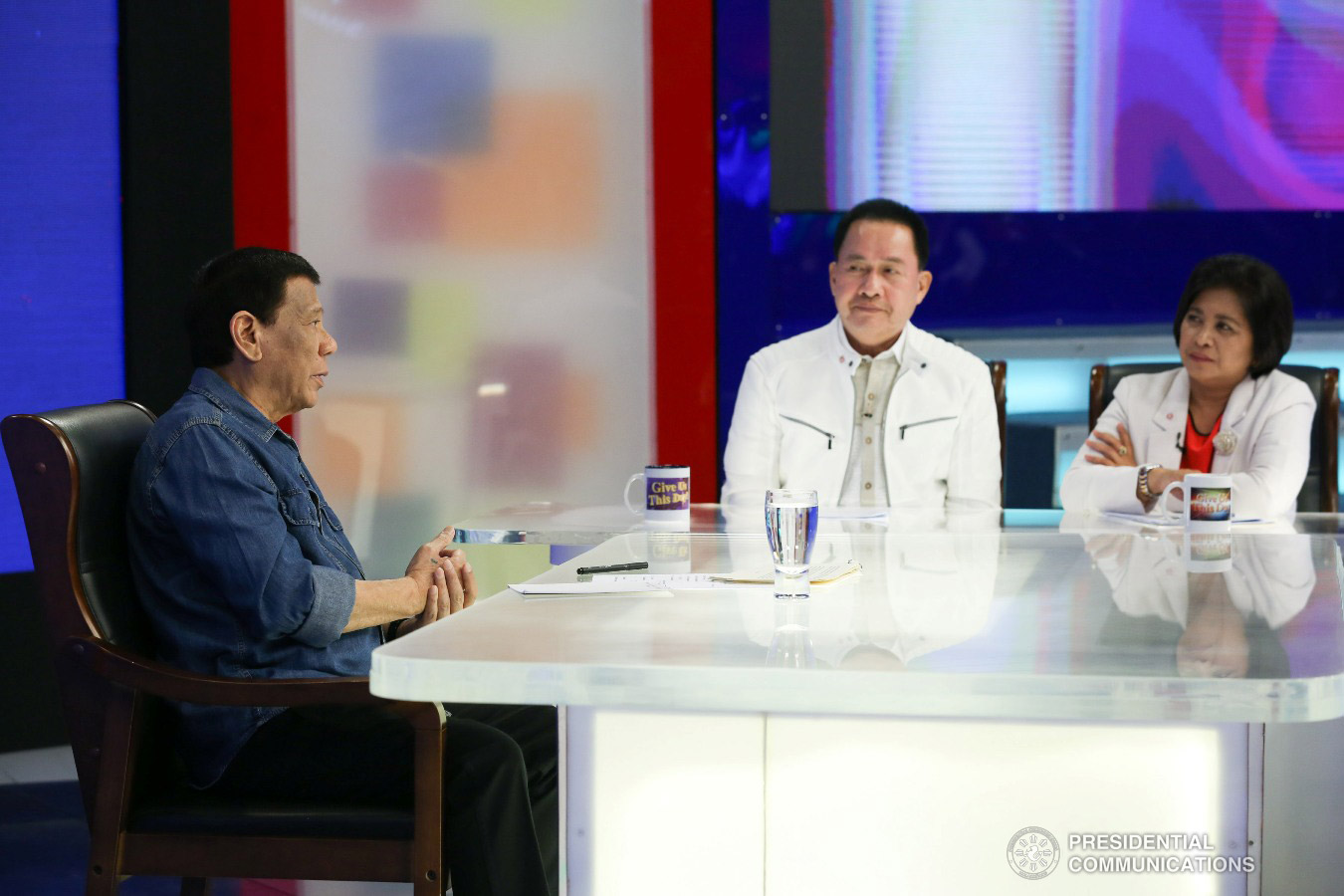
Duterte guests in Apollo Quiboloy's (center) SMNI show, Give Us This Day, in 2019.

Duterte considers his close friend, pastor Apollo Quiboloy of the Kingdom of Jesus Christ (KJC), as his spiritual adviser. Duterte would become estate administrator of the properties KJC in March 2024, following Senate inquiries launched against the church and Quiboloy.

In his post-presidency in January 2024, Duterte visited the wake of CBCP president Fernando Capalla in Davao Cathedral, during which he stated he attends Masses thrice every Sunday; he further added "I am a very holy man. I'm a whole human being now".

=== Health ===
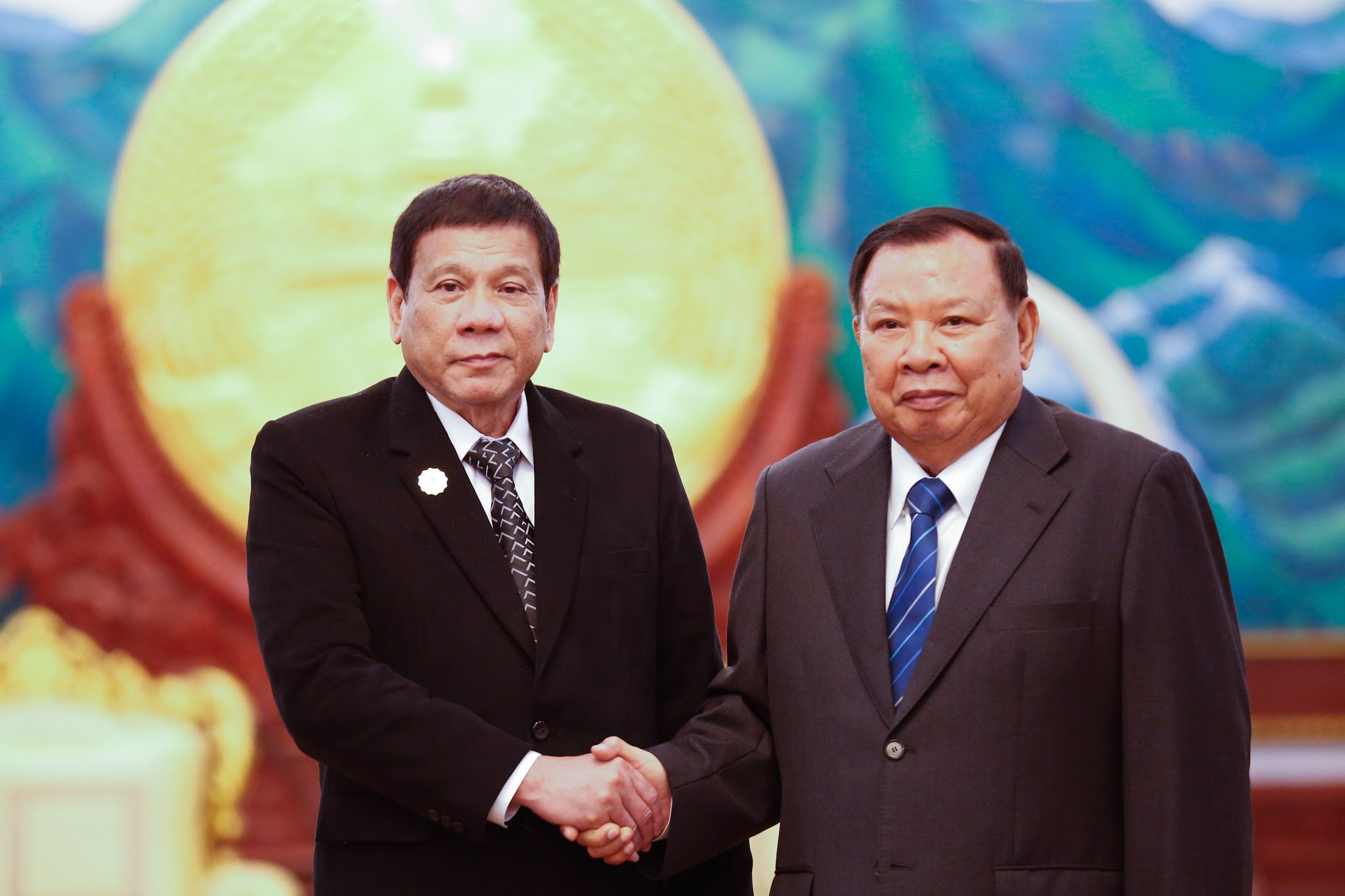
Rodrigo Duterte with Laotian President Bounnhang Vorachith in Vientiane, Laos on September 7, 2016

Duterte has Buerger's disease, an inflammation of blood vessels, mostly in the limbs, and Barrett's esophagus, wherein esophageal cells are gradually replaced by gastrointestinal cells. He has denied rumors of throat cancer.

Duterte admitted in December 2016 that he had been a user of the addictive opioid drug fentanyl. He said that a doctor prescribed the drug to alleviate back pain and headaches, but that he would take more than he was prescribed. Duterte later denied that he was a drug addict, and a spokesman stated that he was not affected by side-effects of the drug, which include confusion, anxiety, and hallucinations.

Duterte has boasted about his use of Viagra: "When I was young, I could do overnight, which is more expensive. When I got old, I could do short time only because I have such a short time left. After one erection, that's it. No more. Without Viagra, it's even more difficult."

A psychological assessment of Duterte was commissioned by a doctor named Natividad Dayan during Duterte's marriage annulment to Elizabeth Zimmerman in July 1998. The result was that Duterte (then Davao City mayor) was found to have "antisocial narcissistic personality disorder", exemplified by "gross indifference, insensitivity and self-centeredness", and a "grandiose sense of self-entitlement and manipulative behaviors". According to the assessment, he had a "pervasive tendency to demean, humiliate others and violate their rights and feelings", and was "unable to reflect on the consequences of his actions."

In a speech to the Filipino community in Russia, Duterte revealed that he has myasthenia gravis, a neuromuscular disease, which makes his eye droop.

== Electoral history ==
Electoral history of Rodrigo Duterte
Year	Office	Party		Votes received				Result
Year	Office	Local	National	Total	%	P.	Swing	Result
1988	Mayor of Davao City	Lakas ng Dabaw	Independent	100,021	36.94%	1st	—N/a	Won
1992	Mayor of Davao City	Lakas ng Dabaw	Nacionalista	185,569	60.69%	1st	+23.72	Won
1995	Mayor of Davao City	Lakas ng Dabaw	Lakas–NUCD–UMDP	300,161	98.49%	1st	+37.80	Won
2001	Mayor of Davao City	HTL	PDP–Laban	215,035	—N/a	1st	—N/a	Won
2004	Mayor of Davao City	HTL	PDP–Laban	315,437	66.14%	1st	—N/a	Won
2007	Mayor of Davao City	HTL	PDP–Laban	382,185	98.90%	1st	+32.76	Won
2013	Mayor of Davao City	HTL	PDP–Laban	473,735	100.00%	1st	+1.10	Unopposed
2025	Mayor of Davao City	HTL	PDP–Laban	662,630	87.91%	1st	-12.09	Won
1998	Representative (Davao City–1st)	Alyansa sa Katawhan sa Dabaw	LAMMP	123,069	73.53%	1st	—N/a	Won
2010	Vice Mayor of Davao City	HTL	Liberal	440,062	80.26%	1st	—N/a	Won
2016	President of the Philippines	—N/a	PDP–Laban	16,601,997	39.02%	1st	—N/a	Won

== Honors and awards ==
=== Honorary doctorates ===
Duterte declined an honorary doctor of laws degree offered by the University of the Philippines amid opposition from members of the university. Duterte was conferred an honorary doctorate degree for international relations or foreign diplomacy from the Moscow State Institute of International Relations on October 5, 2019. Duterte received an honorary Juris Doctor degree from his alma mater, San Beda College of Law in November 2023.

=== Duterte Day ===
On March 28, 2023, the Davao City Council passed a resolution declaring every March 28—Duterte's birthday—as "Duterte Day" in recognition for the "great and continuing contribution" of Duterte to the city and the Philippines.

=== IBP Golden Pillar of Law Award ===
Duterte was conferred the Golden Pillar of Law Award on September 15, 2025, from the Davao City chapter of the Integrated Bar of the Philippines (IBP). Human rights lawyers and activists urged the IBP to revoke the award viewing that his role in the war on drugs contradicts with the spirit of the recognition.

The national office of the IBP maintained Duterte's presumed innocence as it "do not confer guilt or grace beyond the reach of law" but nevertheless pledge to review rules concerning the award. IBP Davao insist that Duterte satisfy the criteria for the award based on professional longevity and standing status and that the Golden Pillar award does not "serve as an endorsement of political acts or personal ideologies".

=== List of honors ===
==== National honors ====
- Knight Grand Cross of Rizal (KGCR) – (2017)
- Awards for Promoting Philippines-China Understanding (APPCU), Hall of Fame – (2023)
- Integrated Bar of the Philippines Golden Pillar of Law Award – (2025)

==== Foreign honors ====
- Malaysia
  - Johor: Grand Knight of The Most Esteemed Order of Sultan Ibrahim of Johor, 1st Class (SMIJ) – Dato' (2019)
- Brunei
  - Sultan of Brunei Golden Jubilee Medal – (2017)

== See also ==
- List of presidents of the Philippines
- List of presidents of the Philippines by previous executive experience
- Dutertismo
- Political positions of Rodrigo Duterte

== Notes ==
Political offices
Preceded by Cornelio Maskariño	Vice Mayor of Davao City; Officer in Charge; 1986–1987	Succeeded by Gilbert Abellera
Preceded by Jacinto Rubillar	Mayor of Davao City; 1988–1998	Succeeded by Benjamin de Guzman
Preceded by Benjamin de Guzman	Mayor of Davao City; 2001–2010	Succeeded by Sara Duterte
Preceded by Sara Duterte	Vice Mayor of Davao City; 2010–2013	Succeeded by Paolo Duterte
Preceded by Sara Duterte	Mayor of Davao City; 2013–2016	Succeeded by Sara Duterte
Preceded by Benigno Aquino III	President of the Philippines; 2016–2022	Succeeded by Bongbong Marcos
Preceded by Sebastian Duterte	Mayor of Davao City; 2025–present	Succeeded by Sebastian Duterte as Acting Mayor of Davao City
House of Representatives of the Philippines
Preceded by Prospero Nograles	Member of the Philippine House of Representatives from Davao City's 1st district 1998–2001	Succeeded by Prospero Nograles
Party political offices
Preceded by Ismael Sueno as Chairman of PDP–Laban	Chairman of Partido Demokratiko Pilipino; 2016–present	Incumbent
Vacant Title last held by Corazon Aquino	PDP–Laban nominee for President of the Philippines; 2016	Most recent Ronald dela Rosa and Bong Go withdrew candidacies ahead of 2022 election
Positions in intergovernmental organisations
Preceded by Bounnhang Vorachith	Chairperson of ASEAN; 2017	Succeeded by Lee Hsien Loong
Order of precedence
Preceded by Gloria Macapagal Arroyo as Former President	Order of Precedence of the Philippines as Former President	Succeeded by Alan Peter Cayetano as Senate President
