= Los Angeles County Redistricting Commission =

The Los Angeles County Redistricting Commission is a Redistricting commission charged by statute with redrawing the boundaries of the Los Angeles County Board of Supervisors.

== History ==
Prior to 2016, the Board appointed a Boundary Redistricting Committee (BRC) which provided an advisory map to the Board for amendment and approval. Following the passage of SB 958, the Board was tasked by the state government with establishing an independent redistricting commission. The 14-member commission was first constituted to draw the boundaries following the 2020 United States census during the 2020 United States redistricting cycle. Following the 2030 United States census, the commission will redraw the map to include four additional supervisor districts.

== List of members ==
=== 2020-2030 ===
2020-2030 Commissioners
Commissioner David Adam Holtzman
Commissioner Mary Kenney
Commissioner Daniel Mark Mayeda (Co-chair)
Commissioner Mark Mendoza
Commissioner Apolonio Morales
Commissioner Nelson Obregon
Commissioner Priscilla Orpinela-Segura
Commissioner Saira G. Soto
Commissioner Hailes Horacio Soto
Commissioner Brian Mark Stecher, PhD
Commissioner John Patrick Kevin Vento
Commissioner Carolyn Williams (Co-chair)
Commissioner Doreena P. Wong

== See also ==
- California Citizens Redistricting Commission
