= White Americans =

Demographic in the United States

- Proportion of White Americans in each county as of the 2020 US census

Total population
- Alone (one race) ▼204,277,273 (2020 census) ▼61.63% of the total US population In combination (multiracial) ▲31,134,234 (2020 census) ▲9.39% of the total US population Alone or in combination ▲235,411,507 (2020 census) ▼71.02% of the total US population

Regions with significant populations
- All areas of the United States
- California: 16,296,122
- Texas: 14,609,365
- Florida: 12,422,961
- (New York (state)) New York: 11,143,349
- Pennsylvania: 9,750,687

Languages
- Majority: English; Minority: German · Spanish · Irish · Italian · Polish · French · Arabic · Scots · Norwegian · Russian · Dutch · Swedish · Portuguese

Religion
- Protestant 48%; Catholic 19%; Mormon 2%; Jewish 3%; Other 3%; Irreligious 24%; (among non-Hispanic whites only)

Related ethnic groups
- European Americans; North African Americans; Middle Eastern Americans

White Americans (sometimes called Caucasian Americans) are Americans who identify as White people or who meet other definitions of "white" (as explained below). In a more official sense, the United States Census Bureau, which collects demographic data on Americans, defines "white" as "[a] person having origins in any of the original peoples of Europe, the Middle East, or North Africa". White Americans have historically constituted the majority population in the United States, though their share has been gradually declining in recent decades. As of the latest American Community Survey conducted by the U.S. Census Bureau in 2024, an estimated 59.8% of the U.S. population—approximately 203.3 million people—identify as White alone, while Non-Hispanic Whites account for 56.3% of the population, or roughly 191.4 million people. Overall, 72.1% of Americans identify as White either alone or in combination with one or more other racial groups. European Americans are by far the largest panethnic group of White Americans and have constituted the majority population of the United States since the nation's founding. Middle Eastern Americans constitute a much smaller demographic of White Americans, making up around 1.1% of the US population in 2020.

According to the 2020 census, 61.6% of Americans, or 204,277,273 people, identified as White alone. This represented a national decrease from a 72.4% white alone share of the US population in the 2010 census. The share of Americans identifying as White alone or in combination (including multiracial white people) was 71.0% in 2020, a smaller decline from 74.8% of the population in 2010. As opposed to the declines seen in the white alone population, the number of people identifying as part white (in combination with other races) saw a large increase, growing from 2.4% of the population in 2010, to 9.4% in 2020.

While the large decline in the white alone population observed between 2010 and 2020 has been partly attributed to natural trends, researchers have found that most of the sharp growth in the multiracial population, and commensurate decline in the white alone population, were due to changes in the methodology used by the Census Bureau, leading to a significant number of people who previously identified as white alone in 2010, mostly those identifying as White Hispanics, being reclassified as multiracial in 2020. In 2010, around 53% of Hispanics in the country identified as white alone, while in 2020, this number had declined to only 20.3% of Hispanics.

The US Census Bureau uses a particular definition of "white" that differs from some colloquial uses of the term. The Bureau defines "White" people to be those "having origins in any of the original peoples of Europe, the Middle East or North Africa". Within official census definitions, people of all racial categories may be further divided into those who identify as "not Hispanic or Latino" and those who do identify as "Hispanic or Latino". The term "non-Hispanic white", rather than just "white", may be the census group corresponding most closely to those persons who identify as and are perceived to be white in common usage; similarly not all Hispanic/Latino people identify as "white", "black", or any other listed racial category. In 2015, the Census Bureau announced their intention to make Hispanic/Latino and Middle Eastern/North African racial categories similar to "white" or "black", with respondents able to choose one, two, or more racial categories; this change was canceled during the Trump administration. Other persons who are classified as "white" by the US census but may or may not identify as or be perceived as "white" include Arab Americans and Jewish Americans of European or MENA (Middle Eastern or North African) descent. In the United States, the term White people generally denotes a person of European ancestry, but has been legally extended to people of West Asian and North African (Middle Eastern, West Asian, and North African) ancestry. However, in 2024, the Office of Management and Budget announced that the race categories used by the federal government would be updated, and that Middle Eastern and North African Americans will no longer be classified as white in the upcoming 2030 Census.

== History ==
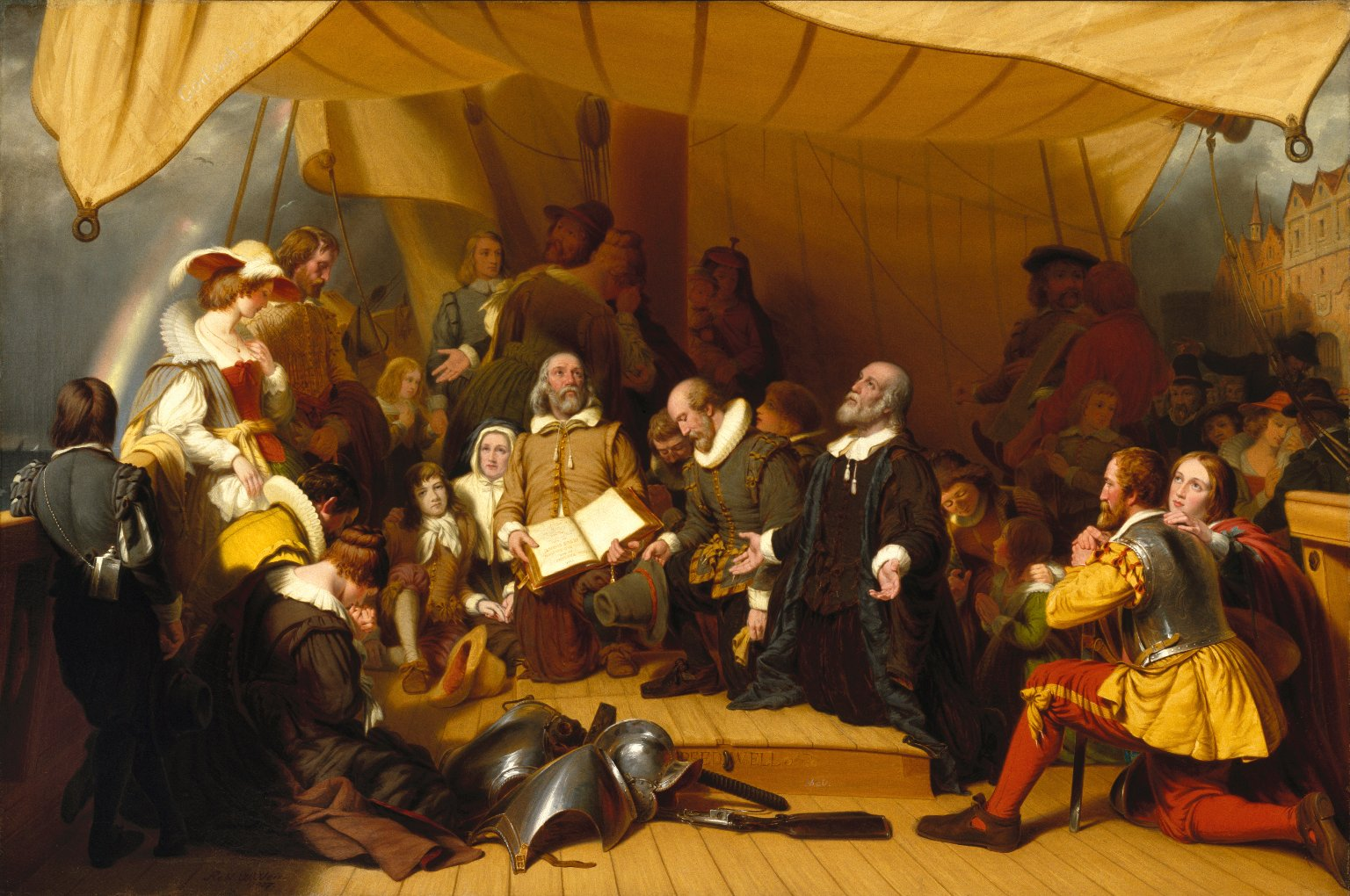
English Dissenters praying in "Embarkation of the Pilgrims", by Robert Walter Weir (1857).

The Western concept of Whiteness originated in Iberia in the 15th century in the aftermath of the Reconquista. The Spanish described Europeans as White and pure (literally, having clean blood) in contrast to the darker Arabs, Jews, Gypsies, and other racial minorities who contaminated the blood of their homeland. As the pioneer of Western colonization, Spain spread its racial terminology across Europe and the world, with other European societies incorporating Spanish terms such as mulatto, negro, indio ("Indian"), and so on, into their own languages. By the 17th century, most European societies were using the term "White race" or "White people". The Spanish caste system, accompanied by the enslavement and dispossession of indigenous peoples and sub-Saharan Africans in the Spanish Empire, was directly transplanted to its colonies, as were similar caste systems in other European colonies.

In the context of American history, the term "white" was first used in early colonial Virginia as a way to justify racism against African Americans. The white ruling class in the colonies deemed black people inferior and suitable for slavery, and sought to draw a clear line between European settlers and white indentured servants, who were protected as citizens under colonial law, and chattel slaves of African descent, who possessed no legal rights.

The population of what would become the United States has been enumerated by racial categories since the first permanent British settlers arrived at Jamestown in 1607. A colonial census from 1620, just after the first enslaved Africans were transported to Virginia, recorded the colony's population as including 2,282 "White" individuals and 20 "Negroes". Estimates indicate that whites made up the majority of non-Indigenous inhabitants of the colonies in every year from 1620 to 1780. Following the independence of the United States, every census since 1790 has enumerated the population by perceived race or "color." Although the categories used by the census have varied over time, the classification of a "white" race has been included on every census conducted in the US. The white population, numbering 3,172,006 in 1790, was primarily composed of English descendants, with a smaller minority of Germans, Irish, and Scots. Over the following decades, the white population would grow steadily as the country expanded westward, reaching a population of 19,553,068 in 1850, or 80.7% of the total population.

Mark Liberman of the University of Pennsylvania stated that "white" often specifically referred to Protestants of northern European origin and not people of all European origin, and that "Throughout American history, white was often implicitly or explicitly opposed to indian rather than to black."

Immigration waves during the 19th and early 20th centuries further grew the white population, which reached 110,286,740 in 1930. The white population also grew considerably in diversity during that time period, driven by large amounts of immigration from Ireland, Italy, Eastern Europe, and Southern Europe, transforming a historically "White Anglo-Saxon Protestant" society into a melting pot of different European ethnic groups. The white population peaked as a percent of the population in 1940, at just under 90% of the total population, and has been gradually declining in share since then, reaching a historic low of 61.6% in 2020, as increased immigration from Asia and Latin America has gradually displaced Europe as the primary source of immigrants to the US.

The new classification, which will come into effect with 2030 United States census, will only include Armenians, Azerbaijanis, Georgians and Turks in the 'White' classification while the other Western Asian ancestries will be falling under the 'Middle Eastern' category.

== Self-reported ancestry ==
Ethnic groups according to the 2020 US Census
1. British (8.30%)
2. German (4.67%)
3. Irish (3.29%)
4. Italian (2.00%)
5. Polish (0.81%)
6. Scandinavian (0.76%)
7. West Asian / North African (0.86%)
8. French (0.54%)
9. Dutch (0.27%)
10. Russian (0.30%)
11. Other or multiple white ethnicities (White alone) (40.0%)
12. Multiracial White (9.39%)
13. Non-white (28.8%)

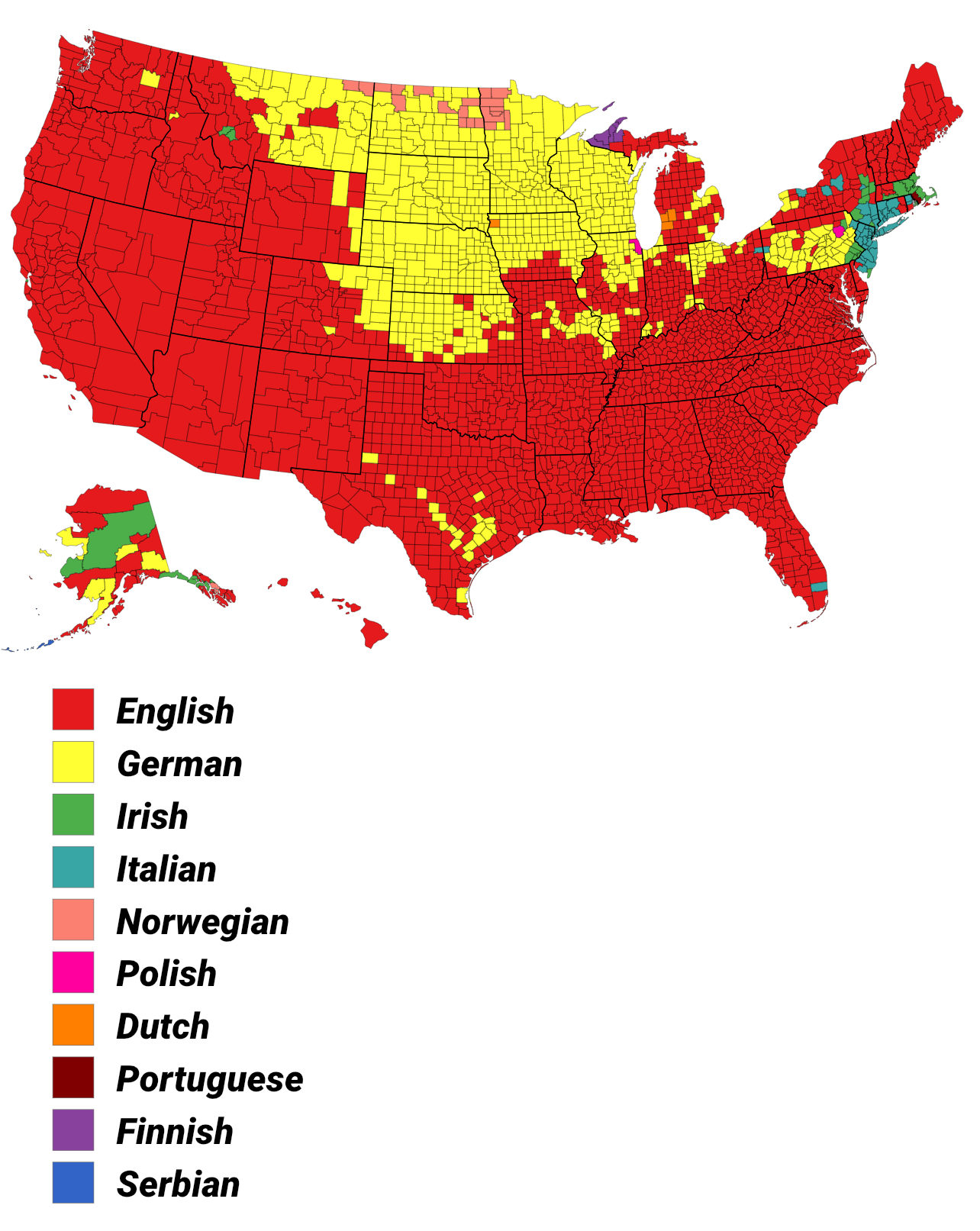
Largest white alone ancestry by county, per the 2020 census

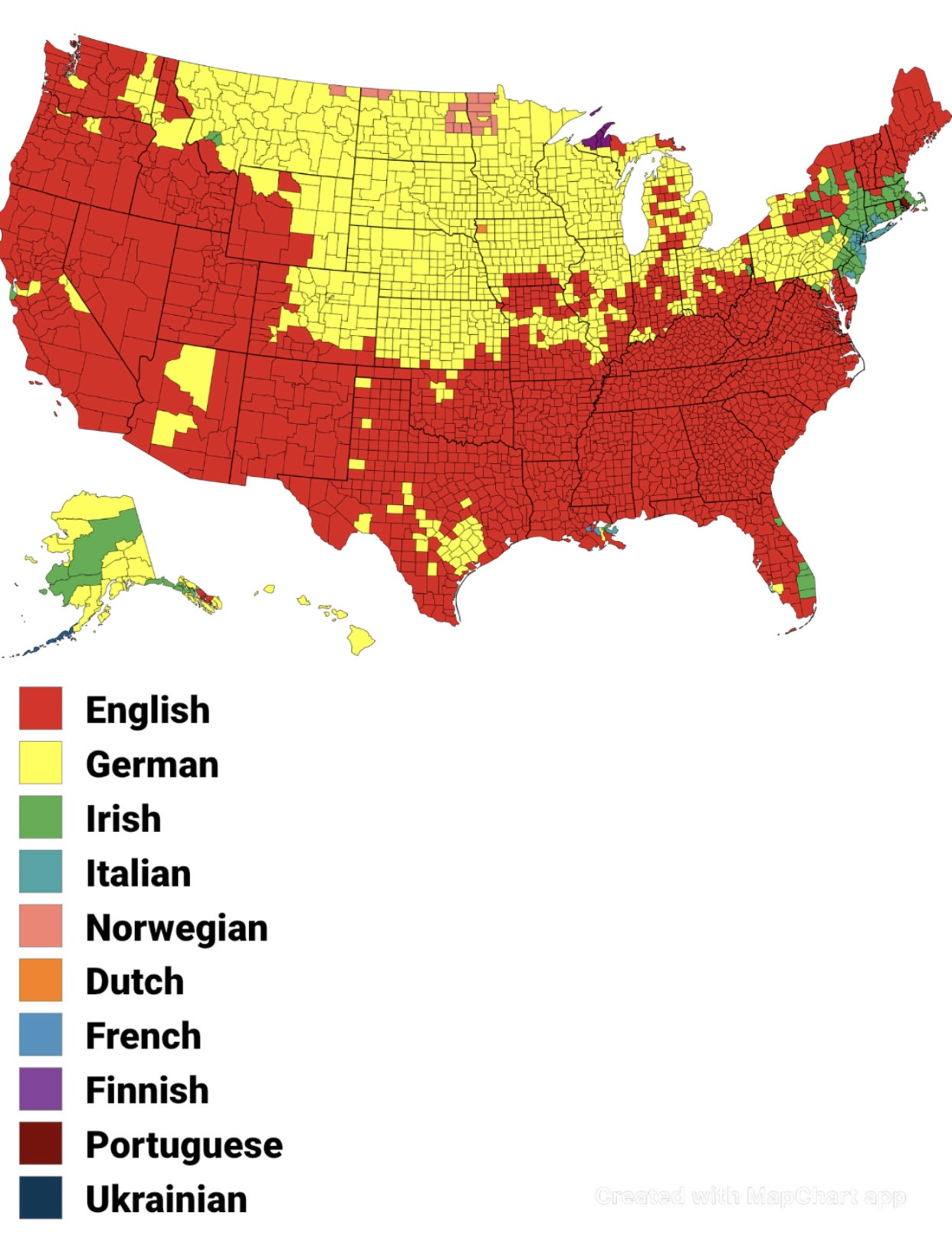
Largest white alone or in any combination ancestry by county, per the 2020 census

The most commonly reported ancestries of White Americans include English (12.5%), German (7.6%), Irish (5.3%), Italian (3.2%), and Polish (1.3%). It is difficult to track full or partial ancestry from Spain in White Hispanics, Mestizos, or Mulattoes since people of direct Spanish descent are also classified as Hispanic, and though the census does track Hispanics' national origin, it does not classify it by race. In 2020, 1,896,300 people claimed ancestry from Spain, 0.6% of the total population. However, genetic studies have found that the vast majority of Hispanics in the US have varying amounts of European ancestry, with the largest component being Spanish or Iberian. The English Americans' demography is also considered a serious under-count, as the stock tend to self-report and identify as simply "Americans" (7%), due to the length of time they have inhabited the United States, particularly if their family arrived prior to the American Revolution.

The following table lists all self-reported European and Middle Eastern ancestries with over 50,000 members, according to 2022 estimates from the American Community Survey:

| Ancestry | Number in 2022 (Alone) | Number as of 2022 (Alone or in any combination) | % Total |
|---|---|---|---|
| German | 13,241,923 | 41,137,168 | 12.3% |
| English | 12,331,696 | 31,380,620 | 9.4% |
| Irish | 8,649,243 | 30,655,612 | 9.2% |
| American (Mostly old-stock British Americans) | 14,929,899 | 17,786,214 | 5.3% |
| Italian | 5,766,634 | 16,009,774 | 4.8% |
| Polish | 2,658,632 | 8,249,491 | 2.5% |
| French (Not including French Canadian) | 1,360,631 | 6,310,548 | 1.9% |
| Scottish | 1,555,579 | 5,352,344 | 1.6% |
| Broadly "European" (No country specified) | 3,718,055 | 4,819,541 | 1.4% |
| Swedish | 740,478 | 3,936,772 | 1.2% |
| Norwegian | 1,224,373 | 3,317,462 | 1.0% |
| Dutch | 858,809 | 3,019,465 | 0.9% |
| Scotch-Irish | 940,337 | 2,524,746 | 0.8% |
| Arab (Including Lebanese (583,719), Egyptian (334,574), Syrian (203,282), Palestinian (171,969), Iraqi (164,851), Moroccan (140,196), and all other Arab ancestries) | 1,502,360 | 2,237,982 | 0.7% |
| Russian | 747,866 | 2,099,079 | 0.6% |
| Spanish (Including responses of "Spaniard," "Spanish," and "Spanish American." Many Hispanos of New Mexico identify as Spanish/Spaniard) | — | 1,926,228 | 0.6% |
| French Canadian | 694,089 | 1,626,456 | 0.5% |
| Welsh | 293,551 | 1,521,565 | 0.5% |
| Portuguese | 543,531 | 1,350,442 | 0.4% |
| Hungarian | 390,561 | 1,247,165 | 0.4% |
| Greek | 486,878 | 1,200,706 | 0.4% |
| Broadly "British" (Not further specified) | 503,077 | 1,196,265 | 0.4% |
| Czech | 340,768 | 1,188,711 | 0.4% |
| Ukrainian | 565,431 | 1,164,728 | 0.3% |
| Danish | 268,019 | 1,127,518 | 0.3% |
| Broadly "Eastern European" (Not further specified) | 566,715 | 951,384 | 0.3% |
| Broadly "Scandinavian" (Not further specified) | 372,673 | 935,153 | 0.3% |
| Swiss | 196,120 | 847,247 | 0.3% |
| Finnish | 189,603 | 606,028 | 0.2% |
| Slovak | 186,902 | 602,949 | 0.2% |
| Lithuanian | 167,355 | 598,508 | 0.2% |
| Austrian | 123,987 | 584,517 | 0.2% |
| Canadian | 249,309 | 542,459 | 0.2% |
| Iranian | 392,051 | 519,658 | 0.2% |
| Armenian | 282,012 | 458,841 | 0.1% |
| Romanian | 251,069 | 450,751 | 0.1% |
| Broadly "Northern European" (No country specified) | 273,675 | 434,292 | 0.1% |
| Croatian | 128,623 | 389,272 | 0.1% |
| Belgian | 96,361 | 316,493 | 0.1% |
| Turkish | 168,354 | 239,667 | 0.07% |
| Pennsylvania German | 155,563 | 228,634 | 0.07% |
| "Czechoslovak" (Not further specified) | 79,992 | 227,217 | 0.07% |
| Albanian | 182,625 | 223,984 | 0.07% |
| "Yugoslav" (Not further specified) | 129,759 | 198,687 | 0.06% |
| Serbian | 96,388 | 191,538 | 0.06% |
| Afghan | 169,255 | 189,493 | 0.06% |
| Slovene | 48,809 | 153,589 | 0.05% |
| Israeli | 80,336 | 144,202 | 0.04% |
| Broadly "Slavic" (No country specified) | 57,491 | 140,956 | 0.04% |
| Bulgarian | 75,386 | 106,896 | 0.03% |
| Assyrian | 64,349 | 93,542 | 0.03% |
| Latvian | 33,742 | 91,859 | 0.03% |
| Cajun | 59,046 | 91,706 | 0.03% |
| Australian | 37,180 | 88,999 | 0.03% |
| Macedonian | 39,586 | 65,107 | 0.02% |
| Basque | 24,219 | 62,731 | 0.02% |
| Icelandic | 18,978 | 53,415 | 0.02% |

== Genetics ==
A 2015 genetic study published in the American Journal of Human Genetics analyzed the genetic ancestry of 148,789 European Americans. The study concluded that British/Irish ancestry is the most common European ancestry among White Americans, with this component ranging between 20% (Wisconsin, Minnesota, North Dakota) and 55% (Mississippi, Tennessee, Arkansas). These states strongly correlated with those where the largest number of people identified with "American" ancestry on the census. Many White Americans also have ancestry from multiple countries. According to the 2022 American Community Survey, 76,678,228 Americans identified with multiple European, Middle Eastern, or North African ancestry groups, with the large majority of these identifying with various European groups.

== Historical and present definitions ==
Definitions of who is "White" have changed throughout the history of the United States.

=== US census definition ===
The term "White American" can encompass many different ethnic groups. Although the United States census purports to reflect a social definition of race, the social dimensions of race are more complex than Census criteria. The 2000 US census states that racial categories "generally reflect a social definition of race recognized in this country. They do not conform to any biological, anthropological or genetic criteria."

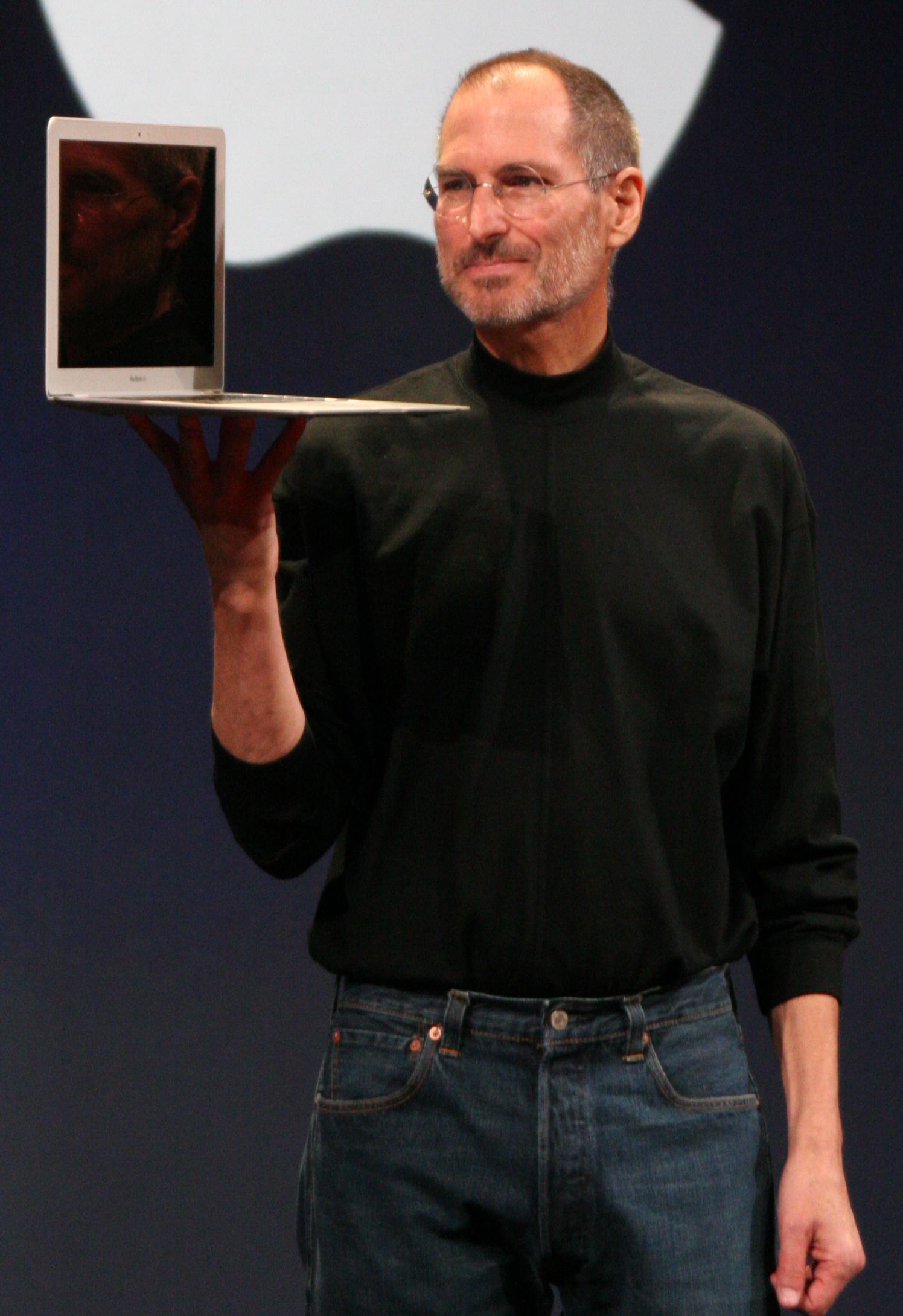
Steven Paul Jobs was an American inventor of Arab (Syrian) and Swiss descent.

The Census question on race lists the categories White or European American, Black or African American, American Indian and Alaska Native, Native Hawaiian or Other Pacific Islander, Asian, plus "Some other race", with the respondent having the ability to mark more than one racial or ethnic category. The Census Bureau defines White people as follows:

"White" refers to a person having origins in any of the original peoples of Europe, the Middle East or North Africa. It includes people who indicated their race(s) as "White" or reported entries such as German, Italian, Lebanese, Arab, Moroccan, or Caucasian.

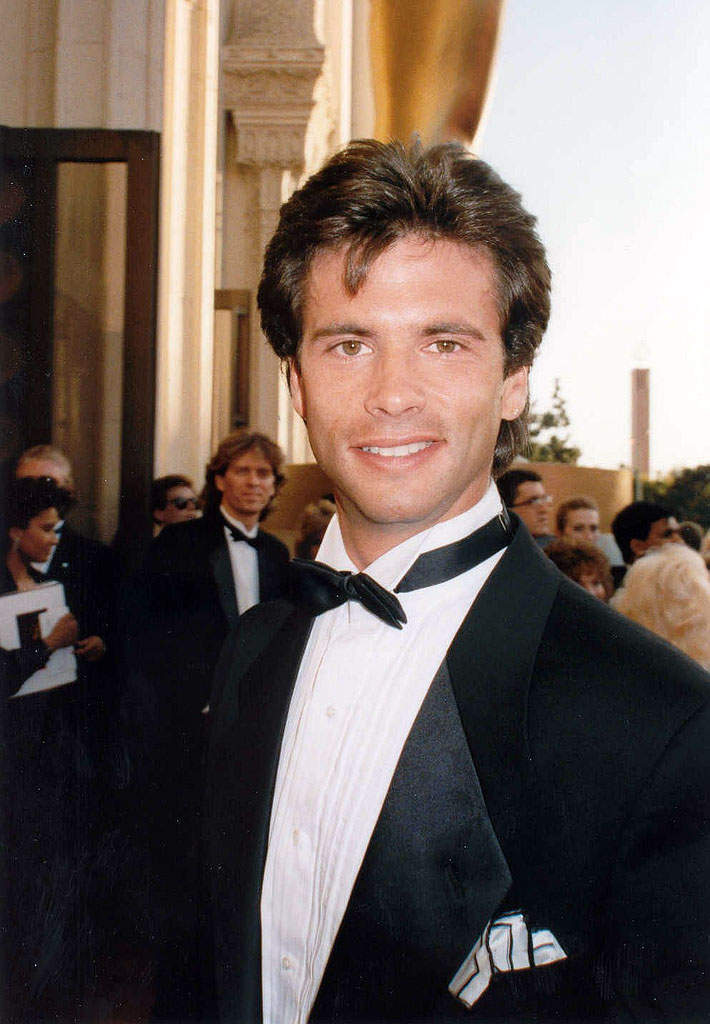
Lorenzo Lamas is an American actor of Spanish-Argentine and Norwegian descent.

In US census documents, the designation White overlaps, as do all other official racial categories, with the term Hispanic or Latino, which was introduced in the 1980 census as a category of ethnicity, separate and independent of race, despite treating as ethnic groups nationalities from the Americas as ethnically and racially diverse as the United States. Hispanic and Latino Americans as a whole make up a racially diverse group and are the largest minority in the country.

Beginning in 1930, Mexican was added as a distinct race on the US census with the explanation that "practically all Mexican laborers are of a racial mixture difficult to classify". The Mexican racial category was removed in 1940, with new direction that "Mexicans are to be regarded as white unless definitely of Indian or other nonwhite race"; this was continued in 1950. 1970 saw the creation of the Spanish Origin category, which superseded previous classifications for Mexicans, Central and South Americans and is now represented by the Hispanic or Latino "ethnic" category. Hispanic or Latino was again to be raised to racial status for the 2020 census (along with Middle Eastern and North African), but this was canceled by President Donald J. Trump.

The characterization of Middle Eastern and North African Americans as white has been a matter of controversy. In the early 20th century, there were a number of cases where people of Arab descent were denied entry into the United States or deported, because they were characterized as nonwhite. In the early 21st century, MENA (Middle Eastern, North African) Americans began lobbying for the creation of their own racial group and were successful; in 2015, the US Census Bureau announced that it had responded to their requests and would add a "Middle Eastern and North African" racial category to the 2020 census. The Trump administration nullified this change after coming to power in 2016.

However, in 2024, the Office of Management and Budget under the Biden administration reinstated the proposed changes, announcing that the race categories used by the federal government would be updated, and that Middle Eastern and North African Americans will no longer be classified as white in the upcoming 2030 Census, and Hispanic and Latino will also be treated similar to a racial, rather than ethnic, category. The Census Bureau defines the planned definition of White people as follows:

"Individuals with origins in any of the original peoples of Europe, including, for example, English, German, Irish, Italian, Polish, and Scottish."

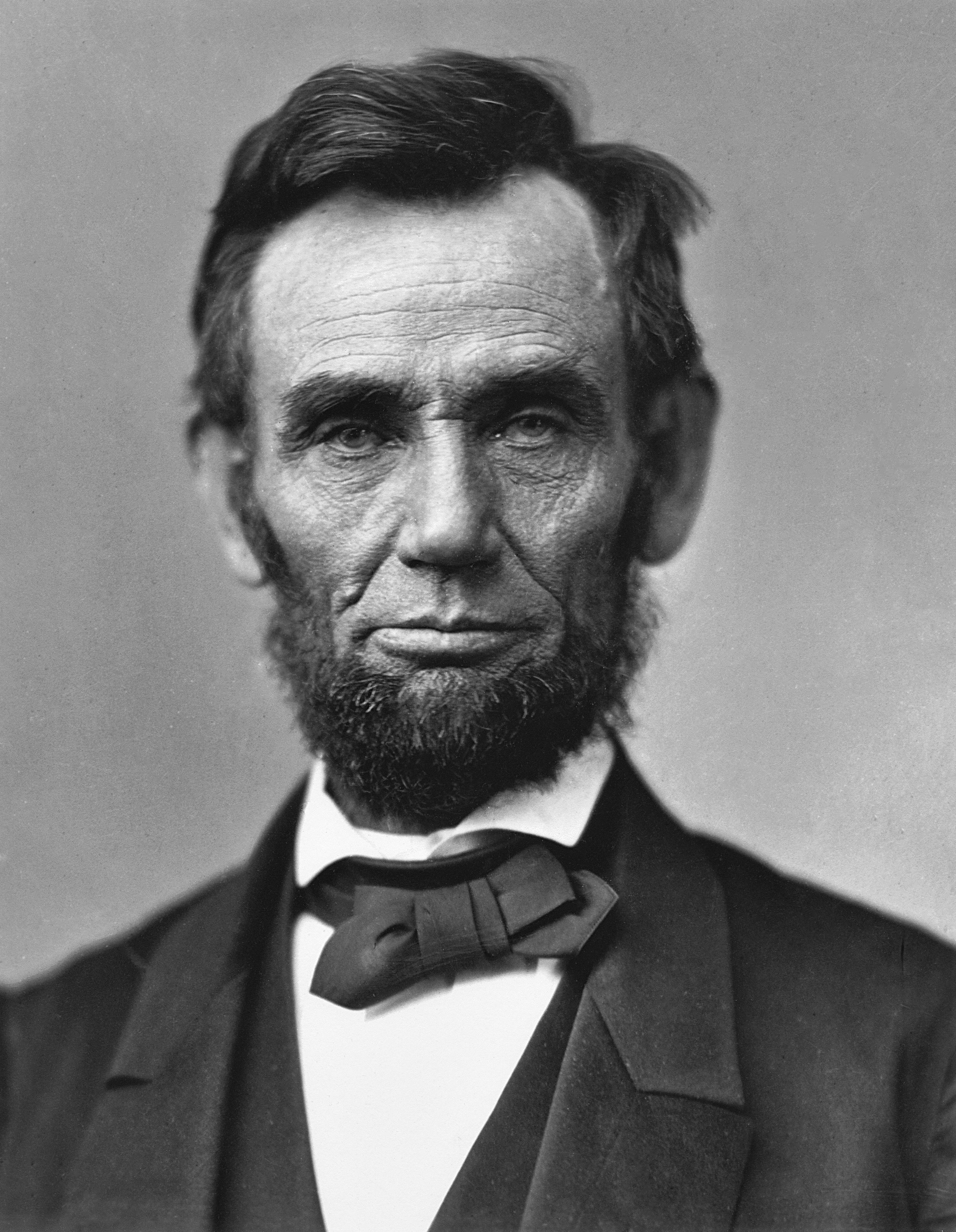
President Abraham Lincoln was descended from Samuel Lincoln and was of English and Welsh ancestry.

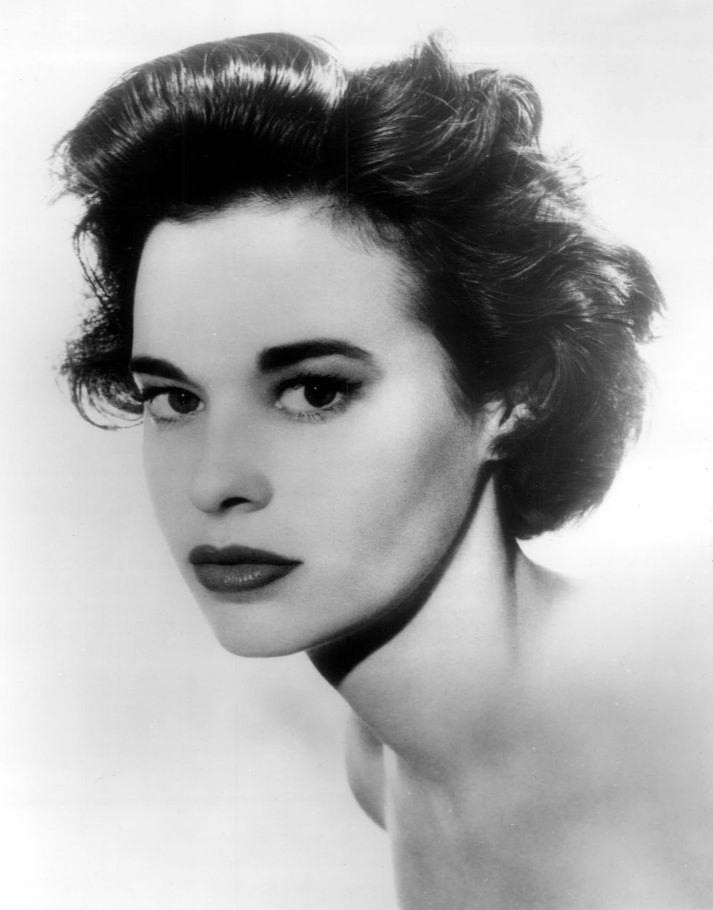
Gloria Vanderbilt, noted artist and designer, was of Dutch descent.

In cases where individuals do not self-identify, the US census parameters for race give each national origin a racial value.

On some government documents, such as the 2007 SEER program's Coding and Staging Manual, people who reported Muslim (or a sect of Islam such as Shia or Sunni), Jewish, Zoroastrian, Caucasian, Middle Eastern, North African, Mexican, Central American or South American ethnicity as their race in the "Some other race" section, without noting a country of origin or Native American tribal affiliation, were automatically tallied as White. The 1990 US census Public Use Microdata Sample (PUMS) listed "Caucasian" or "Aryan" among other terms as subgroups of "white" in their ancestry code listing, but 2005 and proceeding years of PUMS codes do not.

=== Social definition ===
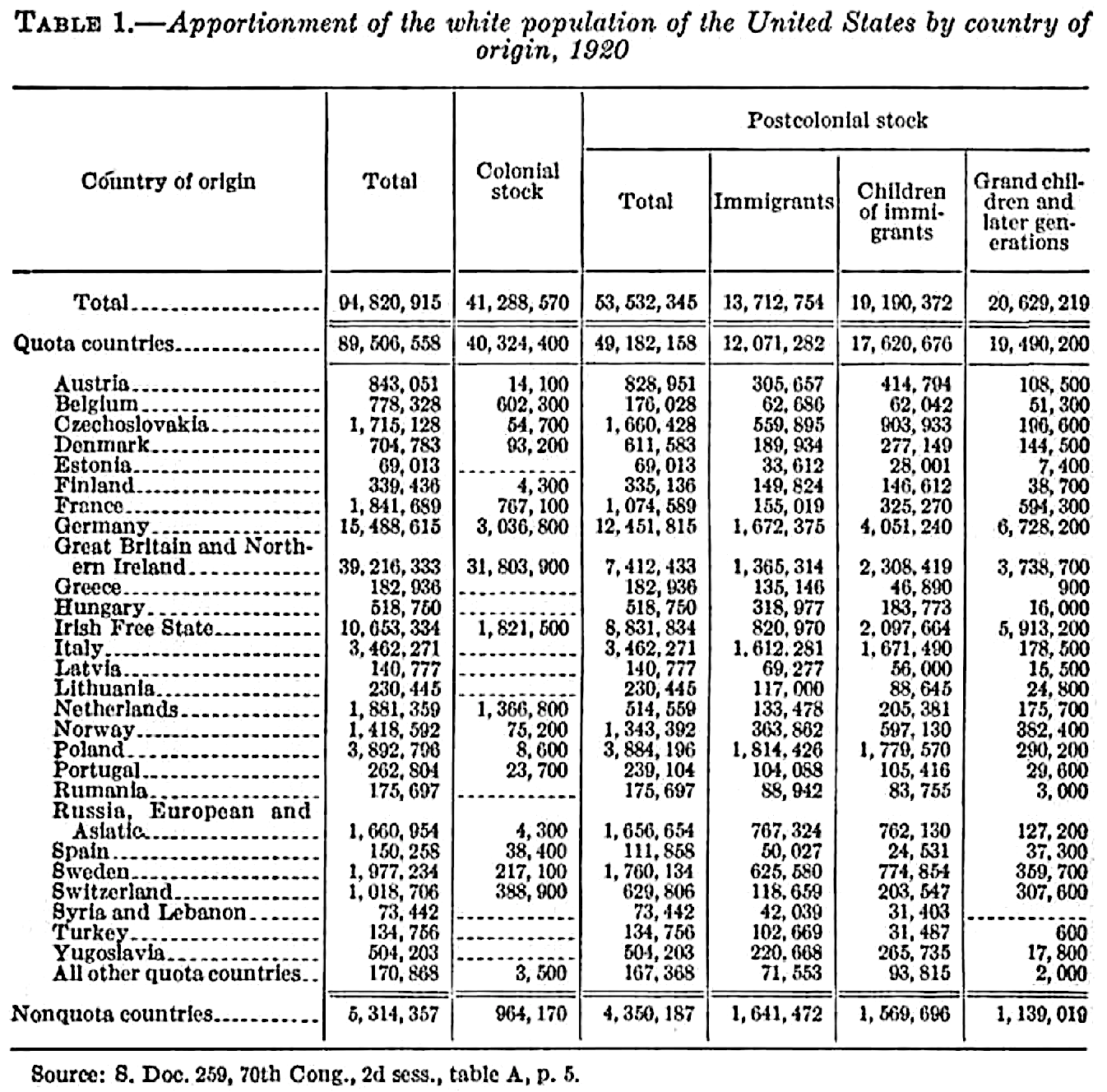
National Origins of the White Population, 1920 census.

Social perceptions of whiteness have evolved over the course of American history. For example, Benjamin Franklin commented that the Saxons of Germany and the English "make the principal Body of White People on the Face of the Earth". Historically, many groups of European descent, such as the Irish, Italians, Greeks, Poles, and Spaniards, were not readily integrated into mainstream American society. The perception of Finns as a Mongoloid rather than a European peoples led to prejudice and discrimination against Finns and debates surrounding Finnish whiteness. In the contemporary United States, any one of European descent is typically considered to be white.

David Roediger argues that the construction of the white race in the United States was an effort to mentally distance slave owners from slaves.

== Demographic information ==
White alone 1790–2020
| Year | Population | % of the US | % change (raw) | % change (share) |
|---|---|---|---|---|
| 1790 | 3,172,006 | 80.7 | Steady | Steady |
| 1800 | 4,306,446 | 81.1 | ▲35.8% | 0.4 |
| 1810 | 5,862,073 | 81.0 | ▲36.1% | -0.1 |
| 1820 | 7,866,797 | 81.6 | ▲34.2% | 0.6 |
| 1830 | 10,532,060 | 81.9 | ▲33.9% | 0.3 |
| 1840 | 14,189,705 | 83.2 | ▲34.7% | 1.3 |
| 1850 | 19,553,068 | 84.3 | ▲37.8% | 0.9 |
| 1860 | 26,922,537 | 85.6 | ▲37.7% | 1.3 |
| 1870 | 33,589,377 | 87.1 | ▲24.8% | 1.5 |
| 1880 | 43,402,970 | 86.5 | ▲29.2% | -0.6 |
| 1890 | 55,101,258 | 87.5 | ▲26.9% | 1.0 |
| 1900 | 66,809,196 | 87.9 | ▲21.2% | 0.4 |
| 1910 | 81,731,957 | 88.9 | ▲22.3% | 1.0 |
| 1920 | 94,820,915 | 89.7 | ▲16.0% | 1.2 |
| 1930 | 110,286,740 | 89.8 (highest) | ▲16.3% | 0.1 |
| 1940 | 118,214,870 | 89.8 | ▲7.2% | 0.0 |
| 1950 | 134,942,028 | 89.5 | ▲14.1% | -0.3 |
| 1960 | 158,831,732 | 88.6 | ▲17.7% | -0.9 |
| 1970 | 178,119,221 | 87.6 | ▲12.1% | -1.1 |
| 1980 | 188,371,622 | 83.1 | ▲5.8% | -4.4 |
| 1990 | 199,686,070 | 80.3 | ▲6.0% | -2.8 |
| 2000 | 211,460,626 | 75.1 | ▲5.9% | -4.8 |
| 2010 | 223,553,265 | 72.4 | ▲5.7% | -2.7 |
| 2020 | 204,277,273 | 61.6 | ▼8.4% | -9.8 |
Source: United States census bureau.

The fifty states, the District of Columbia, and Puerto Rico as of the 2020 United States census

White Americans constitute the majority of the 332 million people living in the United States, with 71% of the population in the 2020 United States census, including 61.6% who identified as "white alone". This represented a 10.6 percentage point national white demographic decline, from a 72.4% share of the US's self-identified white alone population in 2010. (Note: Of the foreign-born population from Europe (4,817 thousand), in 2010, 62% were naturalized.) The white birth rate is below the replacement level.

The largest ethnic groups (by ancestry) among White Americans were English or British, followed by Germans and Irish. In the 1980 census 49,598,035 Americans cited that they were of English ancestry, making them 26% of the country and the largest group at the time, and in fact larger than the population of England itself. Slightly more than half of these people would cite that they were of "American" ancestry on subsequent censuses and virtually everywhere that "American" ancestry predominates on the 2000 census corresponds to places where "English" predominated on the 1980 census.

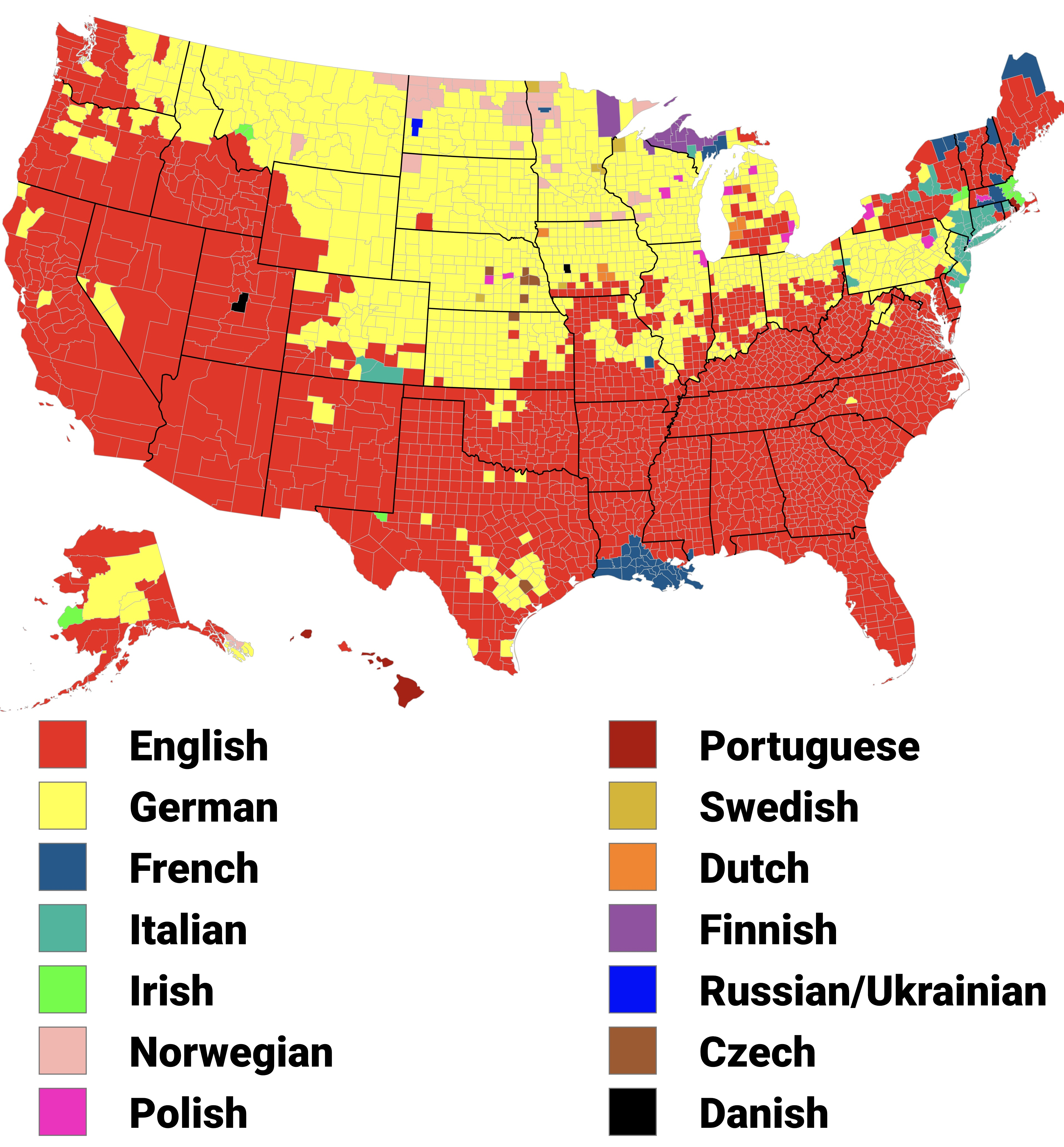
Largest white ancestry by county, per the 1980 census

White American groups according to the census
| Years | Non-Hispanic Whites | | White Hispanics | | Total |
| Years | # | % | # | % | Total |
|---|---|---|---|---|---|
| 2020 | 191,697,647 | 57.84% | 12,579,626 | 3.80% | 204,277,273 |

=== Geographic distribution ===
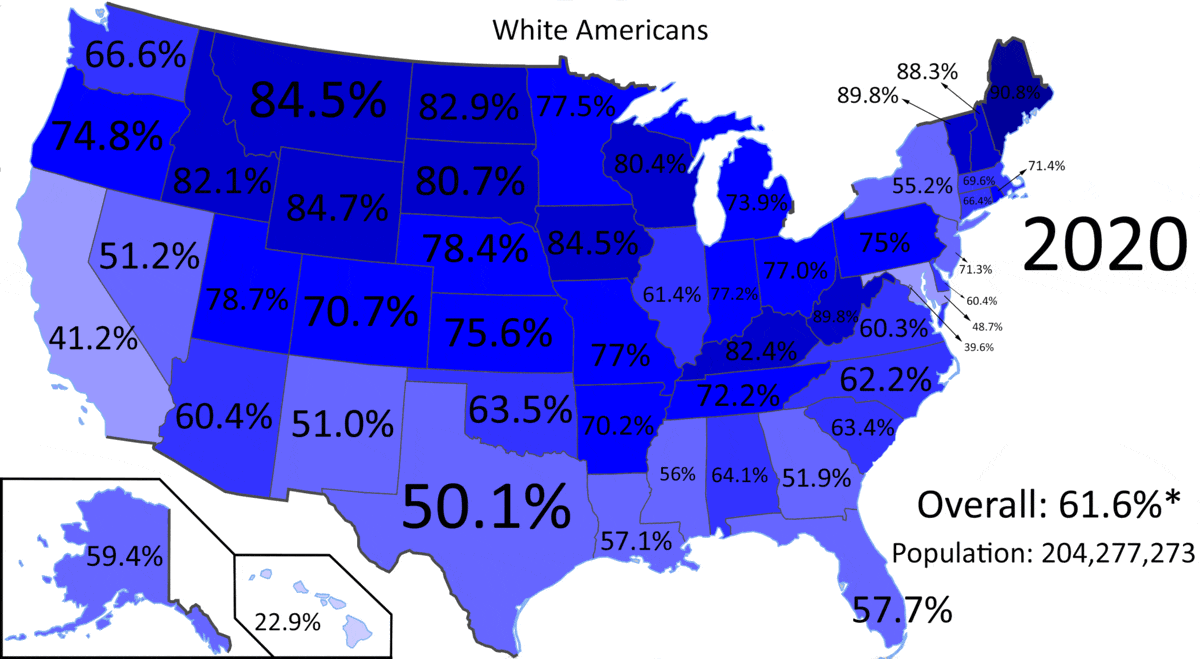
White alone share of population by state, according to the 2020 Census

White Americans alone (including White Hispanics) are the majority racial group in most of the United States. As of 2022, they are not the majority in Hawaii, California, Texas, New Mexico, Nevada, and Maryland, making up just under half of the population in the last four states. If White Hispanics are excluded, they are also a minority in Georgia. They are also a minority in many American Indian reservations, parts of the South, especially areas part of the "black belt", the District of Columbia, all US territories, and in many urban areas throughout the country.

White Americans (alone/single race) population pyramid in 2020

White Americans of one race (or alone) in 2020 by county

White Americans of one race (or alone) from 1960 to 2020

However, when including multiracial Americans, those who identify as part or fully White make up the majority of the population in every state except for Hawaii, along with Puerto Rico.

Overall the highest concentration of those referred to as "non-Hispanic whites" by the Census Bureau are found in the Midwest, New England, the northern Rocky Mountain states, Kentucky, West Virginia, and East Tennessee. The lowest concentration of whites is found in southern, mid-Atlantic, and southwestern states.

White Population in all 50 states and D.C. (2020 Census)
| State or district | Total Population | White alone population | % White Alone | White alone or in any combination population | % White Alone or in Combination |
|---|---|---|---|---|---|
| Alabama | 5,024,279 | 3,220,452 | 64.1% | 3,458,850 | 68.8% |
| Alaska | 733,391 | 435,392 | 59.4% | 516,525 | 70.4% |
| Arizona | 7,151,502 | 4,322,337 | 60.4% | 5,271,038 | 73.7% |
| Arkansas | 3,011,524 | 2,114,512 | 70.2% | 2,317,826 | 77.0% |
| California | 39,538,223 | 16,296,122 | 41.2% | 21,597,610 | 54.6% |
| Colorado | 5,773,714 | 4,082,927 | 70.7% | 4,757,752 | 82.4% |
| Connecticut | 3,605,944 | 2,395,128 | 66.4% | 2,692,022 | 74.7% |
| Delaware | 989,948 | 597,763 | 60.4% | 665,198 | 67.2% |
| District of Columbia | 689,545 | 273,194 | 39.6% | 319,816 | 46.4% |
| Florida | 21,538,187 | 12,422,961 | 57.7% | 15,758,296 | 73.2% |
| Georgia | 10,711,908 | 5,555,483 | 51.9% | 6,212,741 | 58.0% |
| Hawaii | 1,455,271 | 333,261 | 22.9% | 609,215 | 41.9% |
| Idaho | 1,839,106 | 1,510,360 | 82.1% | 1,659,230 | 90.2% |
| Illinois | 12,812,508 | 7,868,227 | 61.4% | 8,934,277 | 69.7% |
| Indiana | 6,785,528 | 5,241,795 | 77.2% | 5,653,387 | 83.3% |
| Iowa | 3,190,369 | 2,694,521 | 84.5% | 2,865,585 | 89.8% |
| Kansas | 2,937,880 | 2,222,462 | 75.6% | 2,490,266 | 84.8% |
| Kentucky | 4,505,836 | 3,711,254 | 82.4% | 3,942,244 | 87.5% |
| Louisiana | 4,657,757 | 2,657,652 | 57.1% | 2,903,192 | 62.3% |
| Maine | 1,362,359 | 1,237,041 | 90.8% | 1,299,963 | 95.4% |
| Maryland | 6,177,224 | 3,007,874 | 48.7% | 3,421,858 | 55.4% |
| Massachusetts | 7,029,917 | 4,896,037 | 69.6% | 5,399,122 | 76.8% |
| Michigan | 10,077,331 | 7,444,974 | 73.9% | 8,044,575 | 79.8% |
| Minnesota | 5,706,494 | 4,423,146 | 77.5% | 4,748,348 | 83.2% |
| Mississippi | 2,961,279 | 1,658,893 | 56.0% | 1,759,356 | 59.4% |
| Missouri | 6,154,913 | 4,740,335 | 77.0% | 5,132,279 | 83.4% |
| Montana | 1,084,225 | 916,524 | 84.5% | 985,660 | 90.9% |
| Nebraska | 1,961,504 | 1,538,052 | 78.4% | 1,674,853 | 85.4% |
| Nevada | 3,104,614 | 1,588,463 | 51.2% | 1,981,814 | 63.8% |
| New Hampshire | 1,377,529 | 1,216,203 | 88.3% | 1,290,770 | 93.7% |
| New Jersey | 9,288,994 | 5,112,280 | 55.0% | 5,897,538 | 63.5% |
| New Mexico | 2,117,522 | 1,078,937 | 51.0% | 1,485,973 | 70.2% |
| New York | 20,201,249 | 11,143,349 | 55.2% | 12,534,037 | 62.0% |
| North Carolina | 10,439,388 | 6,488,459 | 62.2% | 7,128,036 | 68.3% |
| North Dakota | 779,094 | 645,938 | 82.9% | 685,762 | 88.0% |
| Ohio | 11,799,448 | 9,080,688 | 77.0% | 9,717,936 | 82.4% |
| Oklahoma | 3,959,353 | 2,514,885 | 63.5% | 2,991,001 | 75.5% |
| Oregon | 4,237,256 | 3,169,096 | 74.8% | 3,593,558 | 84.8% |
| Pennsylvania | 13,002,700 | 9,750,687 | 75.0% | 10,451,170 | 80.4% |
| Rhode Island | 1,097,379 | 782,920 | 71.3% | 860,658 | 78.4% |
| South Carolina | 5,118,425 | 3,243,442 | 63.4% | 3,516,966 | 68.7% |
| South Dakota | 886,667 | 715,336 | 80.7% | 759,608 | 85.7% |
| Tennessee | 6,910,840 | 4,990,938 | 72.2% | 5,379,080 | 77.8% |
| Texas | 29,145,505 | 14,609,365 | 50.1% | 19,528,528 | 67.0% |
| Utah | 3,271,616 | 2,573,413 | 78.7% | 2,839,674 | 86.8% |
| Vermont | 643,077 | 577,751 | 89.8% | 613,912 | 95.5% |
| Virginia | 8,631,393 | 5,208,856 | 60.3% | 5,848,488 | 67.8% |
| Washington | 7,705,281 | 5,130,920 | 66.6% | 5,912,348 | 76.7% |
| West Virginia | 1,793,716 | 1,610,749 | 89.8% | 1,692,816 | 94.4% |
| Wisconsin | 5,893,718 | 4,737,545 | 80.4% | 5,080,160 | 86.2% |
| Wyoming | 576,851 | 488,374 | 84.7% | 530,590 | 92.0% |
| United States | 331,449,281 | 204,277,273 | 61.6% | 235,411,507 | 71.0% |

White population in all 50 states (plus D.C. and Puerto Rico), as of 2022
| State or territory | Population (2022 est.) | White alone (Non Hispanic) | White alone | White alone or in combination |
|---|---|---|---|---|
| Alabama | 5,074,296 | 64.1% | 65.1% | 69.8% |
| Alaska | 733,583 | 57.4% | 59.6% | 72.6% |
| Arizona | 7,359,197 | 51.8% | 57.8% | 76.5% |
| Arkansas | 3,045,637 | 67.5% | 69.1% | 79.3% |
| California | 39,029,344 | 33.7% | 38.9% | 56.6% |
| Colorado | 5,839,926 | 65.0% | 70.3% | 84.3% |
| Connecticut | 3,626,205 | 62.0% | 65.0% | 75.2% |
| Delaware | 1,018,396 | 58.9% | 59.9% | 68.2% |
| District of Columbia | 671,803 | 36.7% | 38.4% | 47.3% |
| Florida | 22,244,824 | 50.8% | 55.9% | 73.9% |
| Georgia | 10,912,876 | 49.6% | 51.3% | 58.7% |
| Hawaii | 1,440,196 | 20.7% | 22.2% | 43.8% |
| Idaho | 1,939,033 | 79.0% | 81.9% | 91.5% |
| Illinois | 12,582,032 | 58.5% | 61.1% | 71.3% |
| Indiana | 6,833,037 | 76.0% | 77.5% | 84.1% |
| Iowa | 3,200,517 | 82.8% | 84.4% | 90.6% |
| Kansas | 2,937,150 | 73.1% | 76.3% | 85.8% |
| Kentucky | 4,512,310 | 82.2% | 83.1% | 88.8% |
| Louisiana | 4,590,241 | 56.7% | 57.6% | 63.9% |
| Maine | 1,385,340 | 90.2% | 90.8% | 95.9% |
| Maryland | 6,164,660 | 47.1% | 48.4% | 55.4% |
| Massachusetts | 6,981,974 | 67.0% | 68.8% | 77.8% |
| Michigan | 10,034,118 | 72.6% | 74.0% | 80.7% |
| Minnesota | 5,717,184 | 76.2% | 77.2% | 83.5% |
| Mississippi | 2,940,057 | 55.3% | 55.7% | 59.8% |
| Missouri | 6,177,957 | 76.6% | 77.6% | 84.6% |
| Montana | 1,122,867 | 83.5% | 85.1% | 91.7% |
| Nebraska | 1,967,923 | 75.8% | 78.4% | 86.8% |
| Nevada | 3,177,772 | 44.4% | 49.1% | 65.2% |
| New Hampshire | 1,395,231 | 86.6% | 87.5% | 93.9% |
| New Jersey | 9,261,699 | 51.5% | 54.1% | 64.8% |
| New Mexico | 2,113,344 | 34.8% | 46.4% | 70.8% |
| New York | 19,677,152 | 52.9% | 55.2% | 63.4% |
| North Carolina | 10,698,973 | 60.7% | 62.2% | 69.4% |
| North Dakota | 779,261 | 82.0% | 83.2% | 88.2% |
| Ohio | 11,756,058 | 76.1% | 77.1% | 83.1% |
| Oklahoma | 4,019,800 | 62.6% | 65.2% | 78.6% |
| Oregon | 4,240,137 | 71.6% | 74.5% | 85.8% |
| Pennsylvania | 12,972,008 | 73.1% | 74.4% | 80.9% |
| Puerto Rico | 3,221,789 | 0.6% | 26.3% | 60.7% |
| Rhode Island | 1,093,734 | 68.2% | 70.5% | 80.1% |
| South Carolina | 5,282,634 | 62.5% | 63.6% | 69.5% |
| South Dakota | 909,824 | 79.9% | 80.8% | 86.7% |
| Tennessee | 7,051,339 | 71.9% | 73.0% | 79.5% |
| Texas | 30,029,572 | 38.9% | 47.6% | 70.6% |
| Utah | 3,380,800 | 75.6% | 79.2% | 87.7% |
| Vermont | 647,064 | 90.2% | 90.9% | 96.2% |
| Virginia | 8,683,619 | 58.7% | 60.2% | 68.6% |
| Washington | 7,785,786 | 63.5% | 65.9% | 77.7% |
| West Virginia | 1,775,156 | 89.8% | 90.3% | 94.9% |
| Wisconsin | 5,892,539 | 79.0% | 80.4% | 88.0% |
| Wyoming | 581,381 | 81.4% | 84.6% | 92.6% |

Although all large geographical areas are dominated by White Americans, much larger differences can be seen between specific parts of large cities, as well as regions within certain states, especially in the South, where many rural regions are predominantly African American, or the Southwest, where large rural areas, such as the Colorado Plateau, are predominantly populated by Native Americans.

States with the highest percentages of White Americans, either White Alone or in combination with another race as of 2020:

1. Vermont 95.6%
2. Maine 95.4%
3. West Virginia 94.4%
4. New Hampshire 93.7%
5. Wyoming 92.0%
6. Montana 90.9%
7. Idaho 90.2%
8. Iowa 89.8%
9. North Dakota 88.0%
10. Kentucky 87.5%

States with the highest percentages of non-Latino/Hispanic whites, alone or in combination, as of 2020:

1. Maine 92.0%
2. Vermont 91.3%
3. New Hampshire 91.3%
4. West Virginia 90.4%
5. Wyoming 90.7%
6. Idaho 90.7%
7. Utah 88.7%
8. Iowa 88.7%
9. Montana 86.7%
10. Nebraska 86.0%

=== Income and educational attainment ===
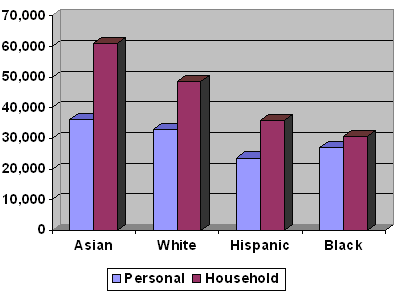

White Americans have the second highest median household income and personal income levels in the nation, by cultural background, only behind Asian Americans. The median income per household member was also the highest, since White Americans had the smallest households of any racial demographic in the nation. In 2006, the median individual income of a White American age 25 or older was $33,030, with those who were full-time employed, and of age 25 to 64, earning $34,432. Since 42% of all households had two income earners, the median household income was considerably higher than the median personal income, which was $48,554 in 2005. Jewish Americans rank first in household income, personal income, and educational attainment among White Americans. In 2005, White households had a median household income of $48,977, which is 10% above the national median of $44,389. Among Cuban Americans, with 86% classified as White, those born in the US have a higher median income and educational attainment level than most other Whites.

The poverty rates for White Americans are the second-lowest of any racial group, with 11% of non-Hispanic white individuals living below the poverty line, 3% lower than the national average. However, due to Whites' majority status, 48% of Americans living in poverty are non-Hispanic white.

White Americans' educational attainment is the second-highest in the country, after Asian Americans'. Overall, nearly one-third of White Americans had a Bachelor's degree, with the educational attainment for Whites being higher for those born outside the United States: 38% of foreign born, and 30% of native born Whites had a college degree. Both figures are above the national average of 27%.

Gender income inequality was the greatest among Whites, with White men outearning White women by 48%. Census Bureau data for 2005 reveals that the median income of White females was lower than that of males of all races. In 2005, the median income for White American females was only slightly higher than that of African American females.

White Americans are more likely to live in suburbs and small cities than their black counterparts.

=== Proportion in each county ===
White American (Alone) population distribution over time

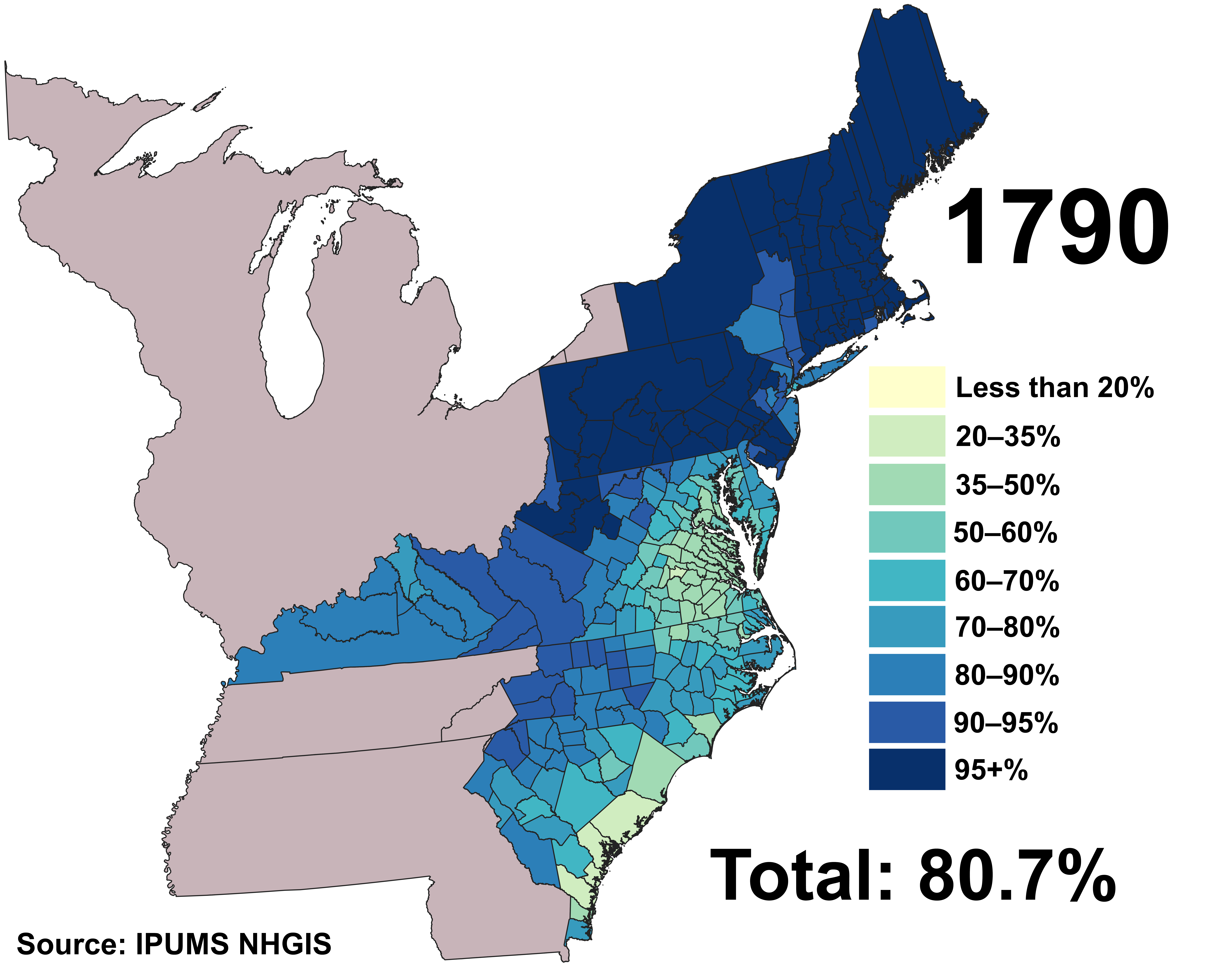
1790

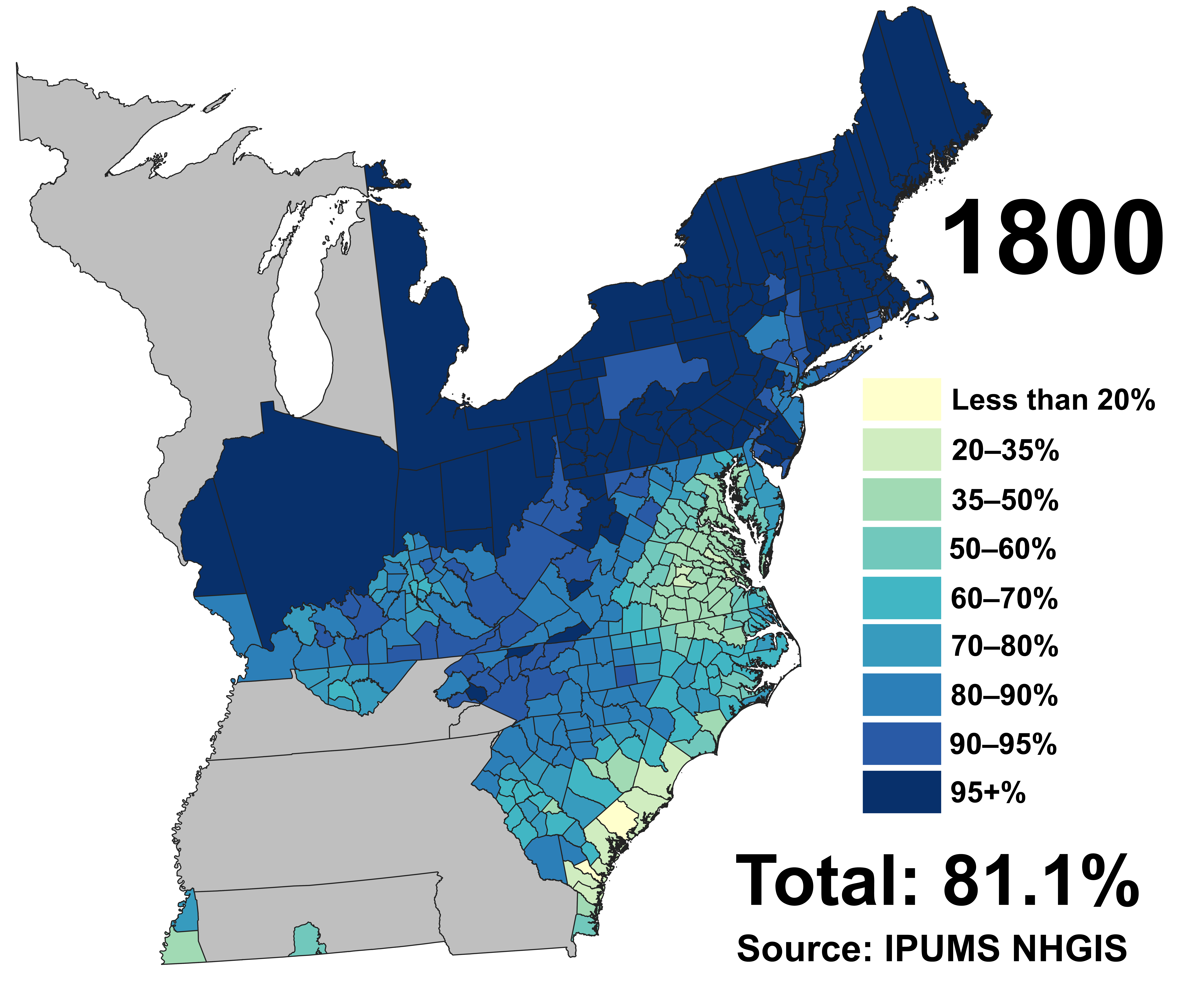
1800

1810

1820

1830

1840

1850

1860

1870

1880

1890

1900

1910

1920

1940

1950

1960

1970

1980

1990

2000

2010

2020

==== White Americans of one race or alone from 2000 to 2020 ====
White American (of one race or alone) population as of 2000, 2010 and 2020 censuses
| State | 2000 | | 2010 | | 2020 | | Growth |
| State | Pop. 2000 | % 2000 | Pop. 2010 | % 2010 | Pop. 2020 | % 2020 | % growth between 2000 and 2010 |
|---|---|---|---|---|---|---|---|
| Alabama | 3,162,808 | 71.1% | 3,275,394 | 68.5% | 3,220,452 | 64.1% | +3.6% |
| Alaska | 434,534 | 69.3% | 473,576 | 66.7% | 435,392 | 59.4% | +9.0% |
| Arizona | 3,873,611 | 75.5% | 4,667,121 | 73.0% | 4,322,337 | 60.4% | +20.5% |
| Arkansas | 2,138,598 | 80.0% | 2,245,229 | 77.0% | 2,114,512 | 70.2% | +5.0% |
| California | 20,170,059 | 59.5% | 21,453,934 | 57.6% | 16,296,122 | 41.2% | +6.4% |
| Colorado | 3,560,005 | 82.8% | 4,089,202 | 81.3% | 4,082,927 | 70.7% | +14.9% |
| Connecticut | 2,780,355 | 81.6% | 2,772,410 | 77.6% | 2,395,128 | 66.4% | -0.3% |
| Delaware | 584,773 | 74.6% | 618,617 | 68.9% | 597,763 | 60.4% | +5.8% |
| (Washington, D.C.) District of Columbia | 176,101 | 30.8% | 231,471 | 38.5% | 273,194 | 39.4% | +31.4% |
| Florida | 12,465,029 | 78.0% | 14,109,162 | 75.0% | 12,422,961 | 57.7% | +13.2% |
| (Georgia (U.S. state)) Georgia | 5,327,281 | 65.1% | 5,787,440 | 59.7% | 5,555,483 | 51.9% | +8.6% |
| Hawaii | 294,102 | 24.3% | 336,599 | 24.7% | 333,261 | 22.9% | +14.4% |
| Idaho | 1,177,304 | 91.0% | 1,396,487 | 89.1% | 1,510,360 | 82.1% | +18.6% |
| Illinois | 9,125,471 | 73.5% | 9,177,877 | 71.5% | 7,868,227 | 61.4% | +0.6% |
| Indiana | 5,320,022 | 87.5% | 5,467,906 | 84.3% | 5,241,791 | 77.2% | +2.8% |
| Iowa | 2,748,640 | 93.9% | 2,781,561 | 91.3% | 2,694,521 | 84.5% | +1.2% |
| Kansas | 2,313,944 | 86.1% | 2,391,044 | 83.8% | 2,222,462 | 75.6% | +3.3% |
| Kentucky | 3,640,889 | 90.1% | 3,809,537 | 87.8% | 3,711,254 | 82.4% | +4.6% |
| Louisiana | 2,856,161 | 63.9% | 2,836,192 | 62.6% | 2,675,652 | 57.1% | -0.7% |
| Maine | 1,236,014 | 96.9% | 1,264,971 | 95.2% | 1,237,041 | 90.8% | +2.3% |
| Maryland | 3,391,308 | 64.0% | 3,359,284 | 58.2% | 3,007,874 | 48.7% | -0.9% |
| Massachusetts | 5,367,286 | 84.5% | 5,265,236 | 80.4% | 4,896,037 | 69.6% | -1.9% |
| Michigan | 7,966,053 | 80.2% | 7,803,120 | 78.9% | 7,444,974 | 73.9% | -2.0% |
| Minnesota | 4,400,282 | 89.4% | 4,524,062 | 85.3% | 4,423,146 | 77.5% | +2.8% |
| Mississippi | 1,746,099 | 61.4% | 1,754,684 | 59.1% | 1,658,893 | 56% | +0.5% |
| Missouri | 4,748,083 | 84.9% | 4,958,770 | 82.8% | 4,740,335 | 77% | +4.4% |
| Montana | 817,229 | 90.6% | 884,961 | 89.4% | 916,524 | 84.5% | +8.3% |
| Nebraska | 1,533,261 | 89.6% | 1,572,838 | 86.1% | 1,538,052 | 78.4% | +2.6% |
| Nevada | 1,501,886 | 75.2% | 1,786,688 | 66.2% | 1,588,463 | 51.2% | +19.0% |
| New Hampshire | 1,186,851 | 96.0% | 1,236,050 | 92.3% | 1,216,203 | 88.3% | +4.1% |
| New Jersey | 6,104,705 | 72.6% | 6,029,248 | 68.6% | 5,112,280 | 55% | -1.2% |
| New Mexico | 1,214,253 | 66.8% | 1,407,876 | 68.4% | 1,078,927 | 51% | +15.9% |
| (New York (state)) New York | 12,893,689 | 67.9% | 12,740,974 | 65.7% | 11,143,349 | 55.2% | -1.2% |
| North Carolina | 5,804,656 | 72.1% | 6,528,950 | 68.5% | 6,448,459 | 62.2% | +12.5% |
| North Dakota | 593,181 | 92.4% | 605,449 | 90.0% | 645,938 | 82.9% | +2.1% |
| Ohio | 9,645,453 | 85.0% | 9,539,437 | 82.7% | 9,080,688 | 77% | -1.1% |
| Oklahoma | 2,628,434 | 76.2% | 2,706,845 | 72.2% | 2,514,884 | 63.5% | +3.0% |
| Oregon | 2,961,623 | 86.6% | 3,204,614 | 83.6% | 3,169,096 | 74.8% | +8.2% |
| Pennsylvania | 10,484,203 | 85.4% | 10,406,288 | 81.9% | 9,750,687 | 75% | -0.7% |
| Rhode Island | 891,191 | 85.0% | 856,869 | 81.4% | 782,920 | 71.3% | -3.8% |
| South Carolina | 2,695,560 | 67.2% | 3,060,000 | 66.2% | 3,243,442 | 63.4% | +13.5% |
| South Dakota | 669,404 | 88.7% | 699,392 | 85.9% | 715,336 | 80.7% | +4.5% |
| Tennessee | 4,563,310 | 80.2% | 4,921,948 | 77.6% | 4,990,938 | 72.2% | +7.9% |
| Texas | 14,799,505 | 71.0% | 17,701,552 | 70.4% | 14,609,365 | 50.1% | +19.6% |
| Utah | 1,992,975 | 89.2% | 2,379,560 | 86.1% | 2,573,413 | 78.7% | +19.4% |
| Vermont | 589,208 | 96.8% | 596,292 | 95.3% | 577,751 | 89.8% | +1.2% |
| Virginia | 5,120,110 | 72.3% | 5,486,852 | 68.6% | 5,208,856 | 60.3% | +7.2% |
| (Washington (state)) Washington | 4,821,823 | 81.8% | 5,196,362 | 77.3% | 5,130,920 | 66.6% | +7.8% |
| West Virginia | 1,718,777 | 95.0% | 1,739,988 | 93.9% | 1,610,749 | 89.8% | +1.2% |
| Wisconsin | 4,769,857 | 88.9% | 4,902,067 | 86.2% | 4,737,545 | 80.4% | +2.8% |
| Wyoming | 454,670 | 92.1% | 511,279 | 90.7% | 488,374 | 84.7% | +12.4% |
| United States of America | 211,460,626 | 75.1% | 223,553,265 | 72.4% | 204,277,273 | 61.6% | +5.7% |

White population by state (includes Hispanics who identify as white)
| State | Pop. 2016 | % 2016 | Pop. 2017 | % 2017 | percentage growth | numeric growth |
|---|---|---|---|---|---|---|
| Alabama | 3,371,066 | 69.35% | 3,374,131 | 69.22% | -0.13% | +3,065 |
| Alaska | 490,864 | 66.20% | 486,724 | 65.79% | -0.41% | -4,140 |
| Arizona | 5,753,506 | 83.28% | 5,827,866 | 83.06% | -0.22% | +74,360 |
| Arkansas | 2,372,843 | 79.41% | 2,381,662 | 79.27% | -0.14% | +3,740 |
| California | 28,560,032 | 72.68% | 28,611,160 | 72.37% | -0.31% | +51,128 |
| Colorado | 4,837,197 | 87.47% | 4,894,372 | 87.29% | -0.18% | +57,175 |
| Connecticut | 2,891,943 | 80.60% | 2,879,759 | 80.26% | -0.34% | -12,184 |
| Delaware | 667,076 | 70.02% | 670,512 | 69.70% | -0.32% | +3,436 |
| (Washington, D.C.) District of Columbia | 305,232 | 44.60% | 313,234 | 45.14% | +0.54% | +8,002 |
| Florida | 16,022,497 | 77.56% | 16,247,613 | 77.43% | -0.13% | +225,116 |
| (Georgia (U.S. state)) Georgia | 6,310,426 | 61.18% | 6,341,768 | 60.81% | -0.37% | +31,342 |
| Hawaii | 370,362 | 25.92% | 366,546 | 25.67% | -0.25% | -3,816 |
| Idaho | 1,567,868 | 93.32% | 1,599,814 | 93.18% | -0.2% | +31,946 |
| Illinois | 9,909,184 | 77.20% | 9,864,942 | 77.06% | -0.14% | -44,242 |
| Indiana | 5,679,252 | 85.61% | 5,690,929 | 85.36% | -0.25% | +11,677 |
| Iowa | 2,860,136 | 91.35% | 2,864,664 | 91.06% | -0.29% | +4,528 |
| Kansas | 2,519,340 | 86.64% | 2,519,176 | 86.47% | -0.17% | -164 |
| Kentucky | 3,901,878 | 87.96% | 3,908,964 | 87.76% | -0.20% | +7,086 |
| Louisiana | 2,958,471 | 63.13% | 2,951,003 | 63.00% | -0.13% | -7,468 |
| Maine | 1,261,247 | 94.81% | 1,264,744 | 94.67% | -0.14% | +3,497 |
| Maryland | 3,572,673 | 59.30% | 3,568,679 | 58.96% | -0.34% | -3,994 |
| Massachusetts | 5,575,622 | 81.71% | 5,576,725 | 81.29% | -0.42% | +1,103 |
| Michigan | 7,906,913 | 79.60% | 7,914,418 | 79.44% | -0.16% | +7,505 |
| Minnesota | 4,687,397 | 84.84% | 4,708,215 | 84.43% | -0.41% | +20,818 |
| Mississippi | 1,771,276 | 59.33% | 1,766,950 | 59.21% | -0.12% | -4,326 |
| Missouri | 5,069,869 | 83.23% | 5,080,444 | 83.10% | -0.13% | +10,575 |
| Montana | 926,475 | 89.20% | 935,792 | 89.08% | -0.12% | +9,317 |
| Nebraska | 1,693,622 | 88.78% | 1,700,881 | 88.58% | -0.20% | +7,259 |
| Nevada | 2,208,915 | 75.15% | 2,235,657 | 74.57% | -0.58% | +26,742 |
| New Hampshire | 1,251,836 | 93.77% | 1,256,807 | 93.59% | -0.18% | +4,971 |
| New Jersey | 6,499,057 | 72.38% | 6,489,409 | 72.06% | -0.32% | -9,648 |
| New Mexico | 1,716,662 | 82.31% | 1,715,623 | 82.16% | -0.15% | -1,039 |
| (New York (state)) New York | 13,856,651 | 69.85% | 13,807,127 | 69.56% | -0.29% | -49,524 |
| North Carolina | 7,212,423 | 71.01% | 7,276,995 | 70.83% | -0.18% | +64,572 |
| North Dakota | 663,424 | 87.81% | 661,217 | 87.53% | -0.28% | -2,207 |
| Ohio | 9,578,424 | 82.41% | 9,579,207 | 82.16% | -0.25% | +783 |
| Oklahoma | 2,923,751 | 74.56% | 2,921,390 | 74.32% | -0.24% | -2,361 |
| Oregon | 3,569,538 | 87.29% | 3,607,515 | 87.08% | -0.21% | +37,977 |
| Pennsylvania | 10,525,562 | 82.31% | 10,507,780 | 82.06% | -0.25% | -17,782 |
| Rhode Island | 892,287 | 84.37% | 890,883 | 84.07% | -0.30% | -1,404 |
| South Carolina | 3,393,346 | 68.2% | 3,440,141 | 68.47% | +0.27% | +46,795 |
| South Dakota | 733,199 | 85.10% | 738,554 | 84.92% | -0.18% | +5,355 |
| Tennessee | 5,231,987 | 78.68% | 5,276,748 | 78.57% | -0.11% | +44,761 |
| Texas | 22,166,782 | 79.44% | 22,404,118 | 79.15% | -0.29% | +237,336 |
| Utah | 2,774,606 | 91.14% | 2,820,387 | 90.93% | -0.21% | +45,781 |
| Vermont | 589,836 | 94.62% | 589,163 | 94.47% | -0.15% | -673 |
| Virginia | 5,891,174 | 70.01% | 5,904,472 | 69.71% | -0.30% | +13,298 |
| (Washington (state)) Washington | 5,820,007 | 79.93% | 5,887,060 | 79.49% | -0.44% | +67,053 |
| West Virginia | 1,712,647 | 93.66% | 1,699,266 | 93.58% | -0.08% | -13,381 |
| Wisconsin | 5,049,698 | 87.47% | 5,060,891 | 87.32% | -0.15% | +11,193 |
| Wyoming | 543,224 | 92.87% | 537,396 | 92.76% | -0.11% | -5,828 |
| United States | 248,619,303 | 76.87% | 249,619,493 | 76.64% | -0.23% | +1,000,190 |

===== Non-Hispanic population =====
Non-Hispanic white population by state
| State | Pop. 2016 | % 2016 | Pop. 2017 | % 2017 | percentage growth | numeric growth |
|---|---|---|---|---|---|---|
| Alabama | 3,198,381 | 65.80% | 3,196,852 | 65.58% | -0.22% | -1,529 |
| Alaska | 454,651 | 61.31% | 449,776 | 60.80% | -0.51% | -4,875 |
| Arizona | 3,819,881 | 55.29% | 3,849,130 | 54.86% | -0.43% | +29,249 |
| Arkansas | 2,175,521 | 72.80% | 2,177,809 | 72.49% | -0.31% | +2,288 |
| California | 14,797,971 | 37.66% | 14,696,754 | 37.17% | -0.49% | -101,217 |
| Colorado | 3,791,612 | 68.56% | 3,827,750 | 68.26% | -0.30% | +36,135 |
| Connecticut | 2,428,332 | 67.68% | 2,404,792 | 67.02% | -0.66% | -23,540 |
| Delaware | 597,728 | 62.74% | 599,260 | 62.30% | -0.44% | +1,532 |
| (Washington, D.C.) District of Columbia | 249,141 | 36.40% | 255,387 | 36.80% | +0.40% | +6,246 |
| Florida | 11,273,388 | 54.57% | 11,343,977 | 54.06% | -0.51% | +70,589 |
| (Georgia (U.S. state)) Georgia | 5,499,055 | 53.32% | 5,507,334 | 52.81% | -0.51% | +8,279 |
| Hawaii | 317,026 | 22.19% | 312,492 | 21.89% | -0.30% | -4,534 |
| Idaho | 1,382,934 | 82.32% | 1,408,294 | 82.02% | -0.30% | +25,360 |
| Illinois | 7,915,013 | 61.65% | 7,849,887 | 61.32% | -0.33% | -65,126 |
| Indiana | 5,280,029 | 79.59% | 5,280,420 | 79.20% | -0.39% | +391 |
| Iowa | 2,696,686 | 86.13% | 2,695,962 | 85.70% | -0.43% | -724 |
| Kansas | 2,215,920 | 76.21% | 2,209,748 | 75.86% | -0.35% | -6,172 |
| Kentucky | 3,767,092 | 84.92% | 3,768,891 | 84.61% | -0.31% | +1,799 |
| Louisiana | 2,760,416 | 58.91% | 2,747,730 | 58.66% | -0.25% | -12,686 |
| Maine | 1,243,741 | 93.50% | 1,246,478 | 93.30% | -0.20% | +2,737 |
| Maryland | 3,098,543 | 51.43% | 3,077,907 | 50.86% | -0.57% | -20,636 |
| Massachusetts | 4,972,010 | 72.86% | 4,953,695 | 72.21% | -0.65% | -18,315 |
| Michigan | 7,489,609 | 75.40% | 7,488,326 | 75.17% | -0.23% | -1,283 |
| Minnesota | 4,442,684 | 80.41% | 4,455,605 | 79.89% | -0.52% | +12,921 |
| Mississippi | 1,697,562 | 56.86% | 1,691,566 | 56.69% | -0.17% | -5,996 |
| Missouri | 4,855,156 | 79.71% | 4,859,227 | 79.48% | -0.23% | +4,071 |
| Montana | 897,790 | 86.44% | 905,811 | 86.23% | -0.21% | +8,021 |
| Nebraska | 1,515,494 | 79.44% | 1,516,962 | 79.00% | -0.44% | +1,468 |
| Nevada | 1,465,888 | 49.87% | 1,470,855 | 49.06% | -0.81% | +4,967 |
| New Hampshire | 1,212,377 | 90.81% | 1,215,447 | 90.52% | -0.29% | +3,070 |
| New Jersey | 5,002,866 | 55.72% | 4,962,470 | 55.10% | -0.62% | -40,396 |
| New Mexico | 789,869 | 38.31% | 783,064 | 37.50% | -0.81% | -6,805 |
| (New York (state)) New York | 11,047,456 | 55.69% | 10,972,959 | 55.28% | -0.41% | -74,497 |
| North Carolina | 6,447,852 | 63.48% | 6,486,100 | 63.13% | -0.35% | +38,248 |
| North Dakota | 641,945 | 84.96% | 639,029 | 84.59% | -0.37% | -2,916 |
| Ohio | 9,229,932 | 79.41% | 9,219,577 | 79.08% | -0.33% | -10,355 |
| Oklahoma | 2,592,571 | 66.12% | 2,581,568 | 65.67% | -0.45% | -11,003 |
| Oregon | 3,115,656 | 76.25% | 3,139,685 | 75.79% | -0.46% | +24,029 |
| Pennsylvania | 9,841,619 | 76.96% | 9,796,510 | 76.50% | -0.44% | -45,109 |
| Rhode Island | 773,405 | 73.13% | 768,229 | 72.50% | -0.63% | -5,176 |
| South Carolina | 3,165,176 | 63.82% | 3,203,045 | 63.75% | -0.07% | +37,869 |
| South Dakota | 710,509 | 82.47% | 714,881 | 82.20% | -0.27% | +4,372 |
| Tennessee | 4,931,609 | 74.17% | 4,963,780 | 73.91% | -0.26% | +32,171 |
| Texas | 11,862,697 | 42.51% | 11,886,381 | 42.00% | -0.51% | +23,684 |
| Utah | 2,400,885 | 78.86% | 2,434,785 | 78.49% | -0.37% | +33,900 |
| Vermont | 580,238 | 93.08% | 579,149 | 92.86% | -0.22% | -1,089 |
| Virginia | 5,247,231 | 62.36% | 5,241,262 | 61.88% | -0.48% | -5,969 |
| (Washington (state)) Washington | 5,049,817 | 69.36% | 5,091,370 | 68.75% | -0.61% | +41,553 |
| West Virginia | 1,688,472 | 92.33% | 1,674,557 | 92.22% | -0.11% | -13,915 |
| Wisconsin | 4,710,928 | 81.60% | 4,713,993 | 81.34% | -0.26% | +3,065 |
| Wyoming | 492,235 | 84.16% | 486,565 | 83.99% | -0.17% | -5,670 |
| United States | 197,834,599 | 61.17% | 197,803,083 | 60.73% | -0.44% | -31,516 |

== Politics ==
| Year | Candidate of the plurality | Political party | % of Non-Hispanic White vote | Result |
|---|---|---|---|---|
| 1980 | Ronald Reagan | Republican Party | 56% | Won |
| 1984 | Ronald Reagan | Republican | 66% | Won |
| 1988 | George H. W. Bush | Republican | 59% | Won |
| 1992 | George H. W. Bush | Republican | 40% | Lost |
| 1996 | Bob Dole | Republican | 46% | Lost |
| 2000 | George W. Bush | Republican | 55% | Won |
| 2004 | George W. Bush | Republican | 58% | Won |
| 2008 | John McCain | Republican | 55% | Lost |
| 2012 | Mitt Romney | Republican | 59% | Lost |
| 2016 | Donald Trump | Republican | 57% | Won |
| 2020 | Donald Trump | Republican | 58% | Lost |
| 2024 | Donald Trump | Republican | 57% | Won |

A majority of White Americans have voted for the Republican Party since the 1968 United States presidential election, with the 1964 United States presidential election being the last election when the Democratic Party won a majority of White voters.

In 2012, 88% of Romney voters were non-Hispanic white while 56% of Obama voters were non-Hispanic white. In the 2008 presidential election, John McCain won 55% of non-Hispanic white votes. In the 2010 House election, Republicans won 60% of the non-Hispanic white votes.

Some academics and commentators have argued that Donald Trump's presidential election victory in 2016 is an example of "White backlash".

== Culture ==
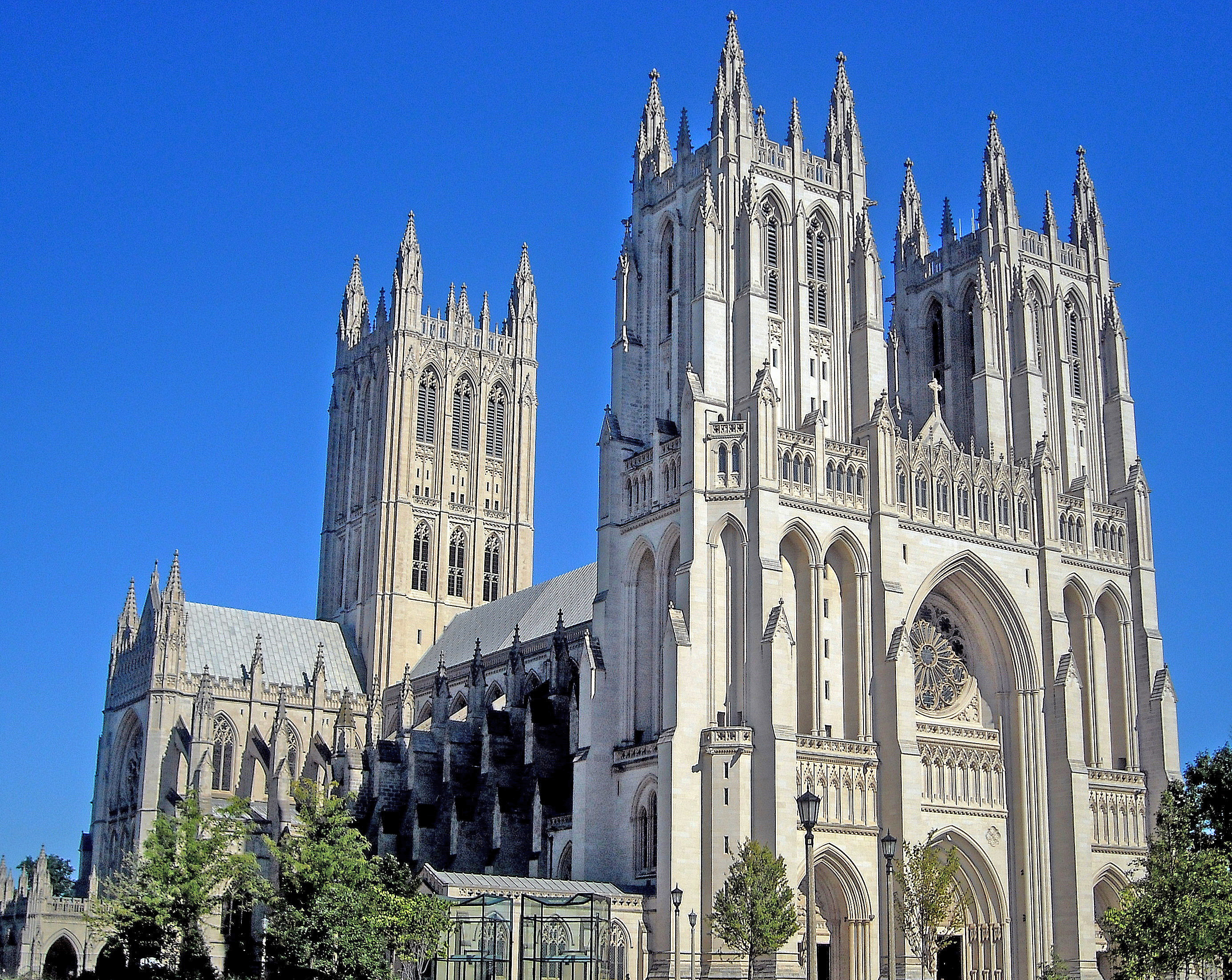
The Washington National Cathedral, the majority are Protestant Christian and a minority are Catholic Christian.

From their earliest presence in North America, White Americans have contributed literature, art, cinema, religion, agricultural skills, foods, science and technology, fashion and clothing styles, music, language, legal system, political system, and social and technological innovation to American culture. White American culture derived its earliest influences from English, German, Scottish, Welsh, and Irish settlers and is quantitatively the largest proportion of American culture. The overall American culture reflects White American culture. The culture has been developing since long before the United States formed a separate country. Much of White American culture shows influences from British culture. Colonial ties to Great Britain spread the English language, legal system and other cultural attributes.

=== Albion's Seed: Four British Folkways in America ===
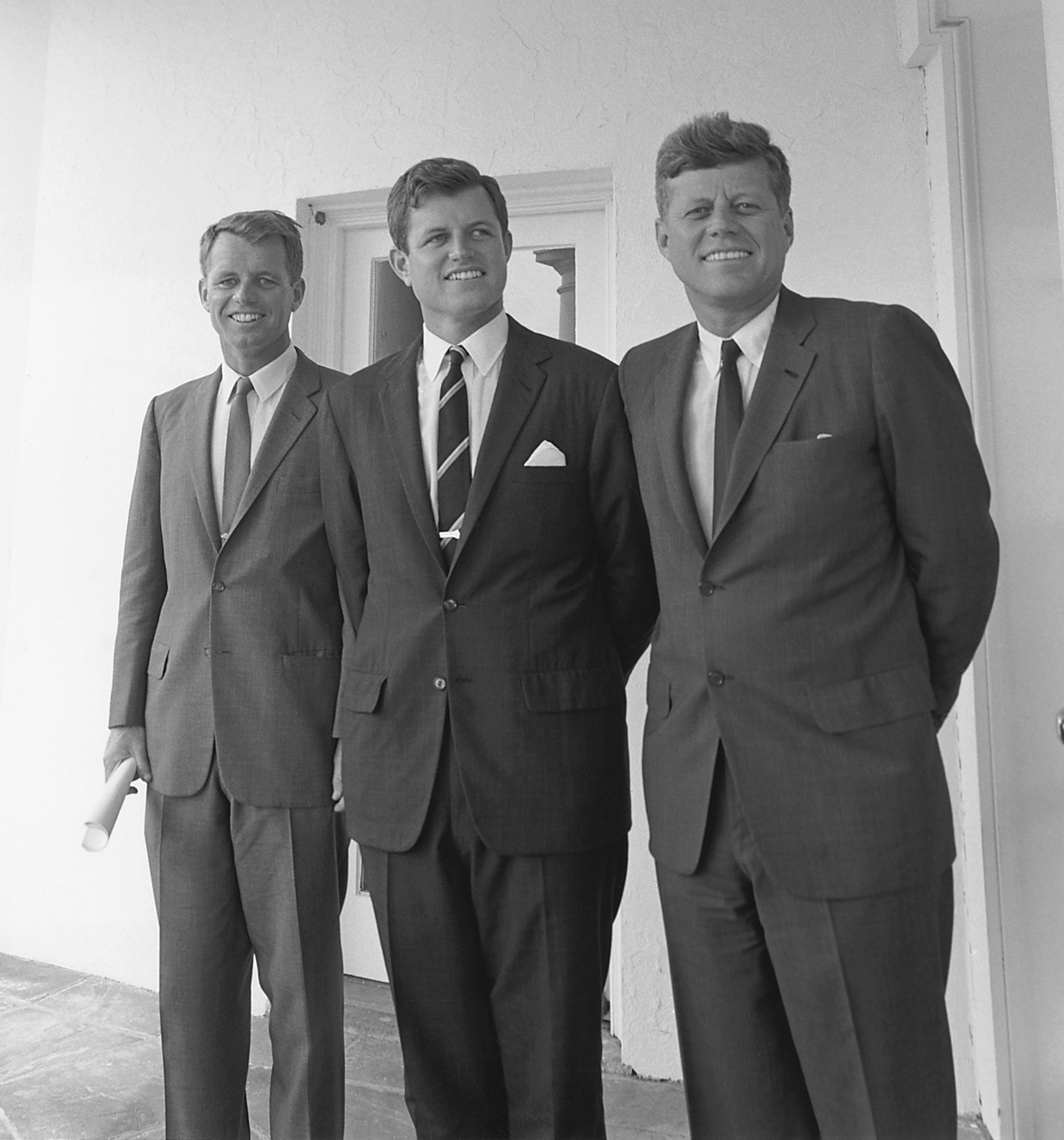
Three members of the Kennedy political dynasty, Robert, Ted and John Kennedy. All eight of their great-grandparents emigrated from Ireland.

In his 1989 book Albion's Seed: Four British Folkways in America, David Hackett Fischer explores the details of the folkways of four groups of settlers from the British Isles that moved to the American colonies during the 17th and 18th centuries from distinct regions of Britain and Ireland. His thesis is that the culture of each group persisted (albeit in modified form), providing the basis for the modern United States.

According to Fischer, the foundation of America's four regional cultures was formed from four mass migrations from four regions of the British Isles by four distinct ethno-cultural groups. New England's formative period occurred between 1629 and 1640 when Puritans, mostly from East Anglia, settled there, thus forming the basis for the New England regional culture. The next mass migration was of southern English Cavaliers and their working class British Isles servants to the Chesapeake Bay region between 1640 and 1675. This spawned the creation of the American Southern culture.

Then, between 1675 and 1725, thousands of Irish, Cornish, English and Welsh Quakers plus many Germans sympathetic to Quaker ideas, led by William Penn, settled the Delaware Valley. This resulted in the formation of the General American culture, although, according to Fischer, this is really a "regional culture", even if it does today encompass most of the US from the mid-Atlantic states to the Pacific Coast. Finally, a huge number of settlers from the borderlands between England and Scotland, sometimes by way of northern Ireland, migrated to Appalachia between 1717 and 1775. This resulted in the formation of the Upland South regional culture, which has since expanded to the west to West Texas and parts of the American Southwest.

In his book, Fischer brings up several points. He states that the US is not a country with one "general" culture and several "regional" cultures, as is commonly thought. Rather, there are only four regional cultures as described above, and understanding this helps one to more clearly understand American history as well as contemporary American life. Fischer asserts that it is not only important to understand where different groups came from, but when. All population groups have, at different times, their own unique set of beliefs, fears, hopes and prejudices. When different groups moved to America and brought certain beliefs and values with them, these ideas became, according to Fischer, more or less frozen in time, even if they eventually changed in their original place of origin.

== Admixture ==
=== Admixture in non-Hispanic whites ===
Population pyramid of Non-Hispanic Whites in 2020.

White Americans have a mean of 98.6% European, 0.19% sub-Saharan African, and 0.18% Native American ancestry according to a study specifically focusing on customers who took a 23andMe DNA test. However, non-European ancestry in White Americans is highly variable; for example, Black ancestry (2% or greater) is found in over five percent of European Americans in Louisiana and South Carolina, and Native American ancestry (2% or greater) is found in over three percent of European Americans in Louisiana and North Dakota. African ancestry is most common in the South and least common in the Midwest; Native American ancestry is more common in Western states than Eastern states.

This study's authors found that, among White Americans with below average Native American ancestry, 7.5% carried a Native American maternal haplogroup, indicating direct descent from a Native American woman. For all White Americans with more than 0.02% Native American ancestry, nearly 29% carried such a haplogroup. These authors also found evidence of a sex bias, because non-White ancestors tended to be female, while White ancestors tended to be male. This phenomenon was explained by the fact that, in early American history, white males were the "most aggressive" colonizers. In Science magazine, the study's lead author said that "early U.S. history may have been a time of a lot of mixture."

Older studies have also been performed. DNA analysis on White Americans by geneticist Mark D. Shriver showed an average of 0.7% sub-Saharan African admixture and 3.2% Native American admixture. The same author, in another study, claimed that about 30% of all White Americans, approximately 66 million people, have a median of 2.3% of Black African admixture. Shriver discovered his ancestry is 10 percent African, and Shriver's partner in DNA Print Genomics, J.T. Frudacas, contradicted him two years later stating "Five percent of European Americans exhibit some detectable level of African ancestry."

In a 2007 study, Gonçalves et al. reported sub-Saharan and Amerindian mtDNA lineages at a frequency of 3.1% (respectively 0.9% and 2.2%) in a sample of 1387 American Caucasians as compared to 62% in white Brazilians (respectively 29% and 33%), 98% for white Colombians (respectively 8% and 90%) and 96% for white Costa Ricans (respectively 7% and 89%). A 2003 study on Y-chromosomes and mtDNA found African admixture in European Americans to be "below the limits of detection".

=== Admixture in Hispanic whites ===
Population pyramid of Hispanic Whites in 2020.

In contrast to non-Hispanic or Latino whites, whose average European ancestry is 98.6%, genetic research has found much higher amounts of non-European ancestry in White Hispanics. A study from 2014 found that the average European admixture among self-identified White Hispanic and Latino Americans is 73%, while the average European admixture for Hispanic Americans overall (regardless of their self-identified race) was 65.1%. However, this study only obtained its genetic data from people who took a paid ancestry test from 23andMe, and as such may not be fully representative of the general Hispanic population in the US.

Another study from 2019 focusing on Native American ancestry in the general US population, which did not differentiate Hispanics by self-identified race, found an average of around 55% European ancestry among all Hispanic Americans, compared to over 98% for self identified non-Hispanic whites, and around 20% in African-Americans.

== See also ==
- Health status of White Americans
- White demographic decline#United States
- American ancestry – Self-identification of "American" descent
- Anglo
- Emigration from Europe
- European Americans
- Hyphenated American
- Middle Eastern Americans
- Non-Hispanic or Latino whites – White Americans who are not Hispanic
- Race and ethnicity in the United States
- Racism in the United States
- Stereotypes of white Americans
- White Anglo-Saxon Protestant
- White ethnic
- White Latino Americans
- White Puerto Ricans
- White Southerners
- White Americans in California
- White Americans in Maryland
  - History of White Americans in Baltimore
- White Americans in Texas
- White supremacy in the United States
- White nationalism in the United States
- White people in Hawaii
- White trash – American English pejorative for poor white people, especially in the American South
- Poor White – United States social caste and ethnic group
- Mountain white – White settlers of the rural Appalachian Mountains in the United States
