= Health of Filipino Americans =

The Filipino American identity comprises principles from both the Philippines and the United States. Although the meaning of identity differs from one individual to another, the fundamental factors are the same. History, genetics, socio-economic status, culture, and education are all indirect factors that influences the identity of an ethnic group; thus, they are also reflective of a group's health beliefs and practices.

The ethnic differences between the Philippines and the United States are influential on the health practices and behaviors of Filipino Americans; however, these differences can also be regarded as being on opposite ends of a spectrum. While it is apparent that the United States exhibits a greater Western approach to health care than Eastern medicine, the health care practices in the Philippines reflect both traditional medicine as well as Western medicine. Due to the historical ties between the United States and the Philippines and societal progression, the healthcare practices of the Philippines also have an allopathic influence.

In reference to the different healthcare approaches of the United States and the Philippines, it is evident that both healthcare strategies and indirect factors are reflected in the health lifestyle of Filipino Americans. Socio-cultural factors such as established medical systems, religion, and superstitious belief are influential indirect factors of Filipino American health.

== Measurement of health of the Filipino American population ==
Health indicators are key in analyzing the overall public health of the Filipino American population. Main health indicators of a particular population include mortality and morbidity. By analyzing these statistics, the effect of certain health practices of the Filipino American population can be determined. Other important health indicators include leading cause of death, life expectancy, neo-natal mortality rate, and the maternal mortality ratio. It is noted that unlike many other Asian Americans, a lot of Filipino Americans suffer from a founder effect due to the Philippine islands being isolated from much of the world until Spanish discovery. This is very similar to the founder effect issues of Ashkenazi Jews, French Canadians, Cajuns, Irish, and Finnish.

=== Hypertension ===
Based on reports of Filipino American communities throughout the United States, specifically in higher population areas of Filipinos, there is a history of a higher prevalence of hypertension exhibited among Filipino American men and women than in other ethnic communities within the United States second to African Americans. In addition, the prevalence of hypertension was greater within Filipino American communities than Filipinos living in the Philippines. There are behavior-related risk factors related with hypertension. These factors include reduced physical activity levels and excess dietary sodium intake from foods. In addition to hypertension, Filipino Americans have a genetic risk of cardiovascular disease and diabetes due to similar founder effect genetic bottlenecks in Philippine island populations.

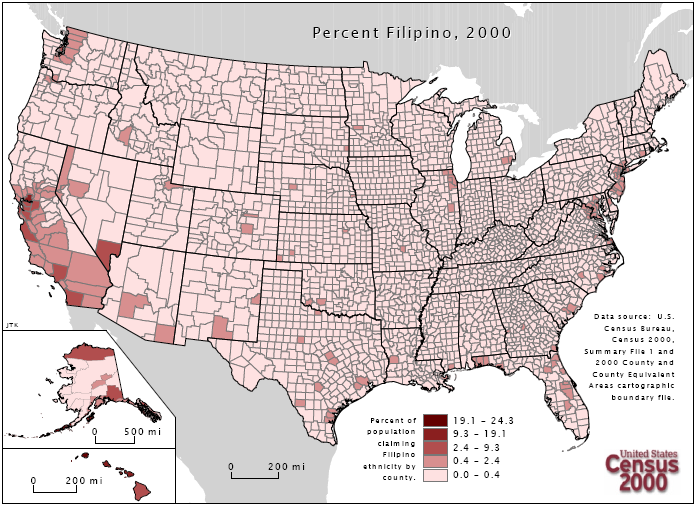
Distribution of Filipinos in the United States

=== Cancer ===
In general, cardiovascular disease, cancer, and strokes are the leading cause of death for Filipino Americans. For Filipino men, the greatest health concern is cardiovascular disease and diabetes, whereas breast cancer is the leading cause of death among female Filipino Americans. Filipino Americans have also high prevalence of the BRCA1 gene mutation, nearly on the same level of prevalence as Ashkenazi Jews, and is a predisposition to early breast and ovarian cancer. This is due to a founder effect among several populations in the Philippines. The prevalence of cancer is higher among Filipino Americans in comparison to other ethnic groups of the United States, which is reflective in their associated low cancer screening rates. Westernized diets and behaviors are considerably influential on the high cancer risk of the Filipino American community. Other factors such as acculturation, lack of targeted educational programs, and socio-economic status influence the morbidity and mortality rates of Filipino Americans.

=== Depression ===
It is common among immigrant groups to experience difficulties with acculturation upon arrival. and Filipino Americans share similar mental health effects to other Asian American groups. In this case, Filipino Americans struggle with cultural alienation, stress from separation, and societal discrimination. Filipinos may struggle with assimilation due to separation from family and financial struggles, which contributes to clinical depression. It is found that Filipino men commit suicide more than Filipino women.

=== Tuberculosis ===
Tuberculosis cases are highly prevalent among Filipino Americans. The Philippines is ranked the ninth on the list of top countries with high incidence and prevalence of tuberculosis. Poverty and health care disparities are major contributors of the tuberculosis epidemic within the Philippines. Filipino immigrants have the highest amount of tuberculosis diagnoses among all Asian immigrant groups. The difference between the tuberculosis incidence rate of Filipino Americans and United States born citizens is more than tenfold.

== Influence of socio-cultural factors ==
It is important to consider both the Filipino and American cultural influences on Filipino Americans to understand the root of Filipino American health practices and behaviors. Addressing culture in healthcare is complicated because of the possibility of feeding stereotypes.

Different cultural values held by an American physician may become a barrier in providing proper care to a Filipino American patient, especially for those who are recent immigrants. Filipino values of sensitivity and concern for an individual's limitations may clash with American values which tend to side on openness and frankness. Health providers whose values may not align with that of the Filipino American patient may not trust the physician and consider them as "ibang tao" (not one of us). This may create a disconnect with the patient who may respond at a superficial level.

Integration of the Filipino culture in the health care interventions of Filipino Americans can be useful in improving participation and health outcomes. Tailoring health screening recruitment strategies, educational materials that build on existing values, and employing Filipino staff who reflect the population have been seen to improve outcomes for Filipino American communities.

Although most Filipinos are familiar with prevention practices, such as health screenings, its importance is usually not well understood so it is not applied as common practice. Elderly Filipinos may choose rather to self-monitor and assess their own illness especially in its early stages. Encouraging prevention practices such as health screenings may be difficult as some adult family members may discourage participation as a means of trying to protect their loved one from external forces.

=== Family and community dynamics ===
Like many immigrant groups, Filipino elderly and recent immigrants may already feel like a burden to their families after having gone through the process of immigrating; thus they tend to hide their health concerns to prevent imposing more stress and a greater financial burden amongst their families. Filipino families are hierarchal in that family members of a younger age are taught to obey and follow their elders, including their older siblings. Thus when patients seek care, may look to a family member to make a decision for them regarding their health options.

On the other hand, family and community relationships can be useful as a means of promoting health: engaging Filipino American communities as a whole on certain health projects can help advance health related initiatives, such as preventative care. Research shows that, in providing a sense of community and a place for different generations of immigrants to meet and learn from each other, community centers provide effective spaces for addressing preventative health.

=== Language ===
Although most Filipinos are proficient in English, language continues to be a barrier in providing proper healthcare. Filipinos take pride in being able to speak English which is perceived as a sign of higher social status, thus they may refuse the need for an interpreter. However, communicating in English may still prove to be challenging in high-stress situations.

=== Dietary acculturation ===
Dietary acculturation is the change in eating patterns due to adopting new diets that occurs when members of the minority group adopt eating patterns of mainstream society. High degree of dietary acculturation is associated with poorer dietary habits. Immigration to the US is associated with increased consumption of fats, sweets, dairy products but decreased consumption of meats and vegetables.

As Filipino Americans acculturate in terms of their diets, they practice bicultural patterns that reflect both a preference for food that is American and traditionally Filipino. The Western dietary acculturation scale, which measures Western eating patterns that include a high intake of fat and sugar, was a significant predictor of the increase in body mass index (BMI) and weight in Filipino Americans. High salt intake is a feature of both the Filipino and Western diet; Filipino Americans are typically aware that their traditional cultural foods have high levels of sodium and fat, which is associated with an increased risk for hypertension.

=== Medical system ===
Medical beliefs and practices are constructed based on an individual's perspective of the world. Socio-cultural influences are considerable factors that determine an individual's belief about disease and treatment. Based on this understanding, ethnic groups (typically groups of Third World countries), follow a holistic approach to health care; thus, encompassing physical, psychological, and spiritual practices that are differentiated from Western medicine.

Folk medicine is not the only medical system used by Filipinos. In general, Filipino health practices are based on biological, spiritual, and personal understandings. In particular, Filipinos support two contrasting medical systems of western medicine and alternative medicine, otherwise referred to as holistic healing. It is a blended health belief system of both biological and supernatural causes to illnesses. Generally, Filipinos consider multiple factors that contribute a particular illness and rarely believe in a sole cause of disease. An individual may consider a natural over a non-natural cause for an illness depending on their socio-cultural influences.

=== Alternative prevention and healing practices ===
==== Religion ====
The Filipino American identity is significantly influenced by cultural aspects of traditional values and religion. During the colonization of the Philippines by Spain, Catholicism was incorporated into the culture of Filipinos. As of 2015, Catholicism is still a dominating religion within the Philippines that influences the identity of Philippine society. Based on the Spanish colonial Christian influences and the predominant Catholic upbringing of Filipinos, religious affiliations are greatly considered by Filipino Americans as a source of health relief. Religion is used for preventative and treatment measures. For example, the phrase, bahala na is a common expression used as to provide psychological comfort. This phrase is commonly translated as it's up to God. Another common saying utang na loog is in reference of being granted a blessing from an answered prayer by God, the Virgin Mary, or a patron saint. In addition to a religious background, the Filipino culture also considers spiritual elements as reasons for disease. Oftentimes, spiritual factors are also considered for treatments. Filipino Americans of a traditional, Catholic derived influence tend to seek guidance and affirmation from spiritual or religious references.

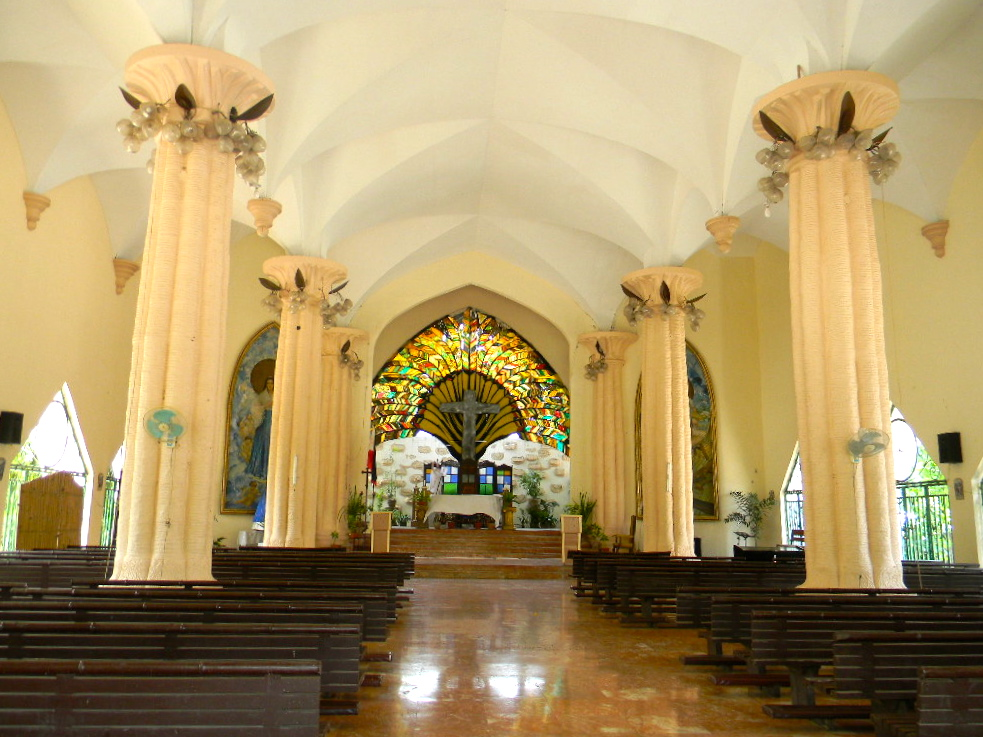
Filipino Catholic Church

Higher members of the Roman Catholic Church, such as ministers and priests, are considered under the category of faith healers. Whether it involves rituals for a specific individual or a large ceremonial mass, it is related to providing preventative measures and relief. A major component of faith healing by the Roman Catholic Church is the involvement of miracle cures for diseases. As indicated by Henderson and Primeaux, the confirmation of miracle cures are based on four criteria – reasonable, instantaneous, evidence of cure, and natural explanations must be ruled implausible.

Further examples of Philippine faith healing include reliance on religious ceremonies and seeking aid from patron saints. Specifically, Filipinos relate their well-being with prayer recitations, display of religious figures, and observation of religious occasions. These occasions involve the celebration of religious holidays, the attendance of Holy Hour, reconciliations, baptisms, confirmations, and weddings. In addition, religious entities are often prayed to. It is believed by Filipino Americans of Catholic upbringing that the signs and symptoms of a particular illness will either be alleviated or some type of support and stability will be provided. Filipinos heavily rely on their faith for health stability and support during the onset of an illness. The use of religion and spirituality as a reference for an individual's well-being can be regarded as an acceptance mechanism that affects which health precautions are taken.

It is arguable that religion is a major component of Filipino-American health behaviors. According to, it is not plausible to assume that familiarity is the sole factor that influences Filipino Americans to adopt a religious influence on health practices. However, there are studies find that Filipino Americans are more comfortable and willing to seek not only spiritual guidance from community institutions that are able to relate culturally. Those of Filipino descent have behaviors that reflect personalism in which Filipinos prefer to interact with others who they find most compatible with. Often, this familiarity and comfort is based on similar values and culture affiliations. Specifically, mental care services are avoided based on language barriers and other cultural differences. Most Filipino Americans tend to seek religious officials as their first choice of support rather than that of health care professionals. An explanation for the preference for health care services is due to the influence of historical Catholic ties of Filipino Americans.

==== Traditional healers ====
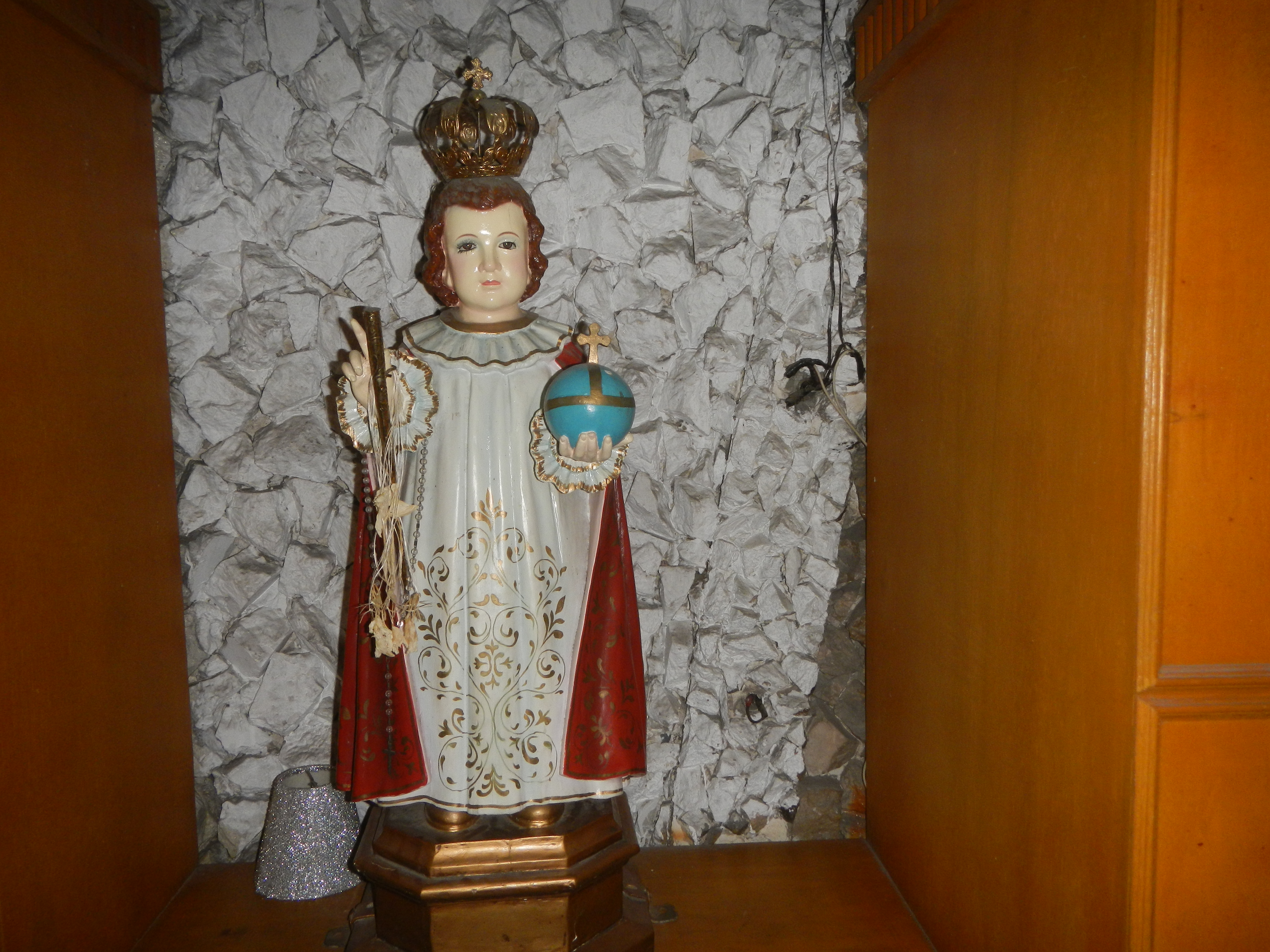
Santo Niño

Faith healers are able to enter a partially conscious state in which they are possessed by religious identities. During this trance, faith healers obtain different characteristics and mannerisms, such as healing abilities. Common holy figures that are highly worshiped in the Philippines, such as Santo Niño and the Virgin Mary, are channeled through faith healers. Consequently, devout believers experience a sense of guidance and aid.

Other than trance states, there are sects of traditional healers that encourage others to focus on proper nutrition for the care of the body. Faith healers often focus on dietary needs and recommend herbal remedies. In addition, some faith healers advise those who are ill to seek health clinics for further help. When patients are not recovering they are highly encouraged to take doctor-prescribed medications and, if needed, hospitalization.

==== Herbal remedies ====
Most traditional Asian American cultures follow health care practices that are reflected of Chinese medicine. Chinese medicine involves disciplines in acupuncture and nutrition, with herbology being a common regimen. Herbal treatments are relied on by Filipino Americans that have not been considered assimilated or rather acculturated to the American culture. Indigenous herbal treatments issued by faith healers are encouraged to provide a balance of energy and diet. Particular blends of herbs are specific to certain ailments. With the guidance of faith healers in Chinese medicine disciplines, the treatments are believed to help align the elements within the human body, which in turn will be reflected in one's immune defense and, moreover, cause a significant decrease in one's susceptibility to disease.

=== Help-seeking behaviors ===
There exists many social barriers towards accessibility of healthcare. Some of these include, but are not limited to, age, marital status, English proficiency, generation status, cultural beliefs and practices, etc. These barriers can greatly affect Filipino-American understanding of the U.S. healthcare system, perspectives towards mental health, and understanding in seeking professional health services. One such barrier that is often cited as being a major obstacle in Asian American health-seeking behavior is the cultural ideation of the "private self," where Asian Americans are taught to keep their emotions out of the public and reserved for closer friends or family. As a result, seeking out mental health services is made into an option of last resort, rather than as a first option. Due to cultural barriers and differences in the understanding of mental health, treatment of Filipino [mental] health may be adversely affected, as cultural differences can affect the reception and effectiveness of mental health services.

The internalized oppression that accompanies the colonial mentality that pervades the Filipino American identity also plays a significant role in the Filipino American perception of mental health services. Due to a complicated historical relationship between the Philippines and the United States, a certain level of caution remains when approaching Western ideas, including medicine. The Filipino American perspective on health-related issues may also differ from that of the Western framework on medicine, leading to large disparities between American and Filipino health professionals. One point of contention is regarding the loose definitions of what constitutes "mental and emotional" well-being contributes to the caution that Filipino Americans have in their help-seeking behaviors.

Filipino Americans are least likely to seek support from professional mental health providers. These variables include fear of shame as well as effects of oppression, indicated by racial discrimination and cultural mistrust. Filipino Americans turn to get support through more indigenous coping strategies, such as religion, spirituality, or family as sources for help.

=== Effects of the model minority myth ===
In various Asian American communities, the "model minority" myth pervades. The image of the "model minority" is idealized, with the population being generally regarded as well-off and successful, implying an assumption of mental toughness and fortitude. In the Asian American youth population, specifically, there is a lower level of social support and higher levels of insurance disparities. As a result, Filipino American college students have underutilized college counseling centers, an action that would otherwise contradict the ideal of the "model minority."

Additionally, due to the existence of the norm for Asian Americans to attend a four-year university, those individuals who attend community college may feel additional social pressures that negatively affect their mental health. These may spawn from feelings of inferiority and can also contribute to lower levels of mental health-seeking behaviors, as a result of feelings of shame.

=== Colonial mentality ===
Colonial mentality, a form of internalized oppression that considers anything American to be favorable to anything Filipino, plays an important role in the psychological well-being of Filipino Americans. Overt colonial mentality plays a negative role in Filipino Americans' psychological health by discriminating against less Americanized Filipino Americans while putting down Filipino features, characteristics, and values. Overt colonial mentality appears to contribute negatively to psychological health by discriminating against less Americanized Filipino Americans while putting down Filipino features, characteristics, and values. Covert colonial mentality appears to contribute to negatively to the "Americanized" Filipino American by inducing feelings of shame and inferiority over their own Filipino identity.

Colonial mentality and mental health help-seeking attitudes have established links with acculturation and enculturation. Colonial mentality increases willingness to acculturation or the extent to which a Filipino becomes more Americanized. Enculturation is a negative correlate to colonial mentality in that colonial mentality decreases as Filipino Americans become more enculturated. The more acculturated the individual is, the more likely the individual has a positive attitude toward seeking help while more enculturated individuals tend to have more negative attitudes toward help-seeking.

Acculturation is related to several types of psychological distress: lower academic achievement, depression, body dissatisfaction, eating disturbances, less social support, and weaker familial relationships. Enculturation has been shown to be a protective factor against depression.

=== Reasons for illnesses ===
==== Natural vs unnatural illnesses ====
The cause of illnesses are distinguished into categories of natural and unnatural illnesses. Natural illnesses are based on sicknesses derived that involve external conditions. Examples of natural illnesses include from exposure to extreme temperatures of hot or cold or transmission of microbes from contaminated sources. Unnatural illnesses are described as sicknesses being obtained due to the lack of commitment to one's faith. The lack of commitment whether it be by sin or a lack of attention to religious practices, the Lord would retract his protection over the individual; thus, making him susceptible to evil influences and ultimately illnesses. It is believed by multiple cultural groups. Evil influences include supernatural forces as well as vengeful spirits - both ancestral and non-ancestral spirits.

==== Filipino health superstitions ====
1. Pasma: Pasma is an illness believed to be caused by an exposure to hot and cold temperatures simultaneously. Symptoms are hot flashes and consistent perspiration of hands and feet. Preventative measures involves the wiping of sweat before it dries on the skin. Traditional healers can detect pasma by noticing pulse patterns. Faith healers regard pulses as crucial indicators of multiple illnesses. The belief of pasma is likely originated from Latin America.
2. The spontaneous fainting of an individual without an apparent natural explanation is believed that it is due to multiple spirits yearning to deliver message to the living. This sudden illness is derived from an Ilocano superstition.
3. Detrimental diseases can be obtained due to improper handling of clothes. According to indigenous Ilocano belief, when clothes that were hung out to dry were forgotten one must wait until the next morning before gathering. In addition, if a pregnant woman does not wear clean clothes the health of the child is at risk.
4. Death occurs when hair is combed at night.
5. Illness will occur if you see a black cat cross your path.
6. Anting-Anting: A crocodile or hog tooth is worn as a charm for protection against harm.
7. Effective medicine is obtained when roots are gathered on Good Friday.

== See also ==
- Health status of Asian Americans
- Medical genetics of Jews
- Founder effect
