= Health status of White Americans =

White Americans, as the largest racial group in the United States, have historically had better health outcomes than oppressed racial groups in the United States. However, in recent years, the scholarly discourse has switched from recognition of the immense positive health outcomes of white Americans towards understanding the negative outcomes unique to this racial group, such as alcoholism.

== Health advantages ==
2007, the 15 leading causes of death in the US were recorded with a specific attention toward racial/ethnic health disparities. For 10 of those 15 causes of death, black Americans had higher rates of death.

The following list describes the categories in which non-Hispanic whites have ranked comparatively better than blacks (in order of total deaths):

1. Heart disease
2. Cancer
3. Stroke
7. Diabetes
8. Respiratory infections
9. Kidney disease
10. Sepsis
13. Hypertension
15. Homicide

They also fare better for:

- Health insurance coverage
- Obesity
- Perinatal conditions including infant morality
- General life expectancy

== Life expectancy ==
Life expectancy can be used to gauge the overall health of a population and is defined as the average number of years a group of infants would live if they were to experience the age-specific death rates that are present in their birth year. White Americans have historically exhibited an advantage over large portions of the US population. From 1980 to 2014, white Americans had the longest life expectancy, black people had the shortest life expectancy in the US, and black men had higher racial differences in life expectancy than black women. These patterns can be identified throughout early childhood until advanced age when the differences become less severe. The differences seen in life expectancy are generally attributed to minority populations having earlier onsets of illness, greater severity of disease, and poorer survival rates.

In recent years, white Americans have collectively experienced a consistently declining life expectancy. In particular, this trend is prevalent among non-college educated whites and is largely related to the deaths of despair phenomenon. After 1998, other first-world countries' mortality rates began to fall by 2% a year, which matched the average rate of decline seen in the US from 1978 to 1998. However, the mortality rate of middle-aged white Americans increased by 0.5%.

=== Diseases of despair ===
In the US, there is a classification of behavior-related medical conditions known as diseases of despair, which comprises: drug or alcohol overdose, suicide, and alcoholic liver disease. The frequency of these illnesses is highest among middle-age working class white people. Scholars have raised the idea that diseases of despair are the result of worsening psychosocial problems that extend from the 1980s and are of concern to the US as a whole. Although these behaviors are thought to be seen with groups who experience lack of social and economic mobility, there are increasing risk factors involved with poor mental health. Despite the vastly different economic trends for white and black Americans, whites are more likely to perceive themselves as having lower social class and are less optimistic about their financial future. This trend among middle-class whites points to an increased need for research on the health status of whites due to continuing rise in premature death caused by these diseases. Further, this trend exemplifies the problematic nature of research using whites as a comparative standard to other ethnic and racial backgrounds in the US.

=== Opioid epidemic ===
From 2010 and into the 2020s, there has been an increase in opioid overdoses among white Americans, specifically in rural areas. Andrew Kolodny, director of the Opioid Policy Research Collaborative at Brandeis University, attributes the disparate opioid usage among white Americans to physicians' increased propensity towards prescribing narcotics to white patients. In more recent years, however, the opioid epidemic has come to disproportionately impact African Americans, despite the earlier narrative that the opioid epidemic was mainly affecting white Ameficans.

== Effects of racialization ==
Structural racism is a system composed of a unequal power dynamics that allows members of the dominating social group to obtain unearned societal privilege through ideology and behavior without intention or dislike of the non-dominant group. Due to the racialized environment that people experience in the US, scholars have studied whether living in areas where there are high levels of racialization will negatively impact the health of individuals living there. Pathways that link racialization to poor health outcomes include economic injustice and social deprivation, environmental and occupational health inequalities, psychosocial trauma, inadequate health care, state-sanctioned violence, alienation from property, and political exclusion. While it has been understood that racism and prejudice negatively affect the health of the individuals who are being discriminated against, there is reason to believe that simply living in an area with racial disparities and tension can be harmful regardless of the person's race or beliefs. US states that had higher levels of "collective disrespect" toward black people had higher age-adjusted mortality rates for both black and white people. A study in the American Journal of Public Health identified higher risks of mortality associated with being male, advanced age, lower socioeconomic status, race, and being divorced or widowed. However, when community-level prejudice was added into this model, higher levels of anti-black prejudice increased the odds of participant mortality by as much as 31%. The study found that the highest level of mortality risk was associated with individuals with lower attitudes of racial prejudice who lived in areas of higher community-level prejudice. Consequently, community-level racial prejudice is a stronger predictor of mortality than socioeconomic status or racial residential segregation.

In a study of Hurricane Katrina survivors, researchers measured the relationship between perception of racism against black Americans among both white and black Americans, and similarly found that perceptions of racism against black Americans were associated with negative mental health outcomes for whites. Measuring levels of racial prejudice and racial attitudes is complicated, however, given the different ways prejudice is presented and the implicit bias in an individual's self-evaluation.

Psychiatrist Jonathan Metzl's 2019 book Dying of Whiteness explores the effects of living in areas with high levels of racial resentment and prejudice. The book notes the hypocrisy of white people adopting political views that negatively affect the health outcomes of white Americans. For example, Metzl found that through an anti-government rhetoric, whites tended to reject the Affordable Care Act expansion, oppose adoption of stricter gun laws, and resist tax cuts intended to build infrastructure in areas concentrated with working-class white populations. His ethnographic research for the book suggests that the politics of racial resentment creates sentiments about government that would ultimately harm life expectancy in a variety of ways for white individuals. The book notes the trend in the lack of acknowledgement among white individuals of macro-level social determinants of health due to a focus on individual effort. This nostalgic idea of hard-work and self-sufficiency negates the impacts of larger health factors and further creates an environment that he believes is not conducive to positive health outcomes.

== Comparison to other white populations ==
Compared to other white populations, white Americans are at a higher risk of poor health outcomes.

A 2008 study found that the wealthiest white Americans had comparable health outcomes to whites from England who had the lowest income and education levels. Malat et al. developed a framework in 2016 that aims to understand the relationship between whiteness and health. In a study of health disparities across Canada and the US, the US consistently had far more pronounced racial health inequities. The extent of these inequities are heavily dependent on the society in which they are occur. These researchers describe the US as being characterized by racial and ethnic segregation, and policies that distribute health resources, housing, and education unequally.

Below is a list of conditions for which the US overall is consistently worse than the average among comparable high-income countries (Australia, Austria, Denmark, Finland, France, Germany, Italy, Japan, Norway, Portugal, Spain, Sweden, Switzerland, the Netherlands, and the United Kingdom):

- Adverse birth outcomes
- Injuries and homicides
- Adolescent pregnancy and STIs
- HIV and AIDS
- Obesity and diabetes
- Heart disease
- Chronic lung disease
- Disability

== See also ==
- Health of Native Americans in the United States
- Health of Filipino Americans
