= Pasma =

Filipino folk illness

Pasma (from Spanish pasmar) refers to a folk illness in Filipino culture that is said to be brought about by too much exposure to coldness and water. Water is believed to facilitate the unhealthy coldness that enters the body in the Filipino culture. There are distinct signs, symptoms, perceived causes and treatments which are recognized in the folk medicine of the Philippines, but these are not described in medical textbooks, discussed in medical schools, or generally recognized by contemporary medical science. However, these symptoms have been perceived and testified as verifiable by Filipinos who have experienced sickness after a long hard day of work and abruptly taking a cold shower.

University of the Philippines anthropologist Michael Tan states:

I've been lecturing in several medical schools for several years now and I keep urging health professionals to be more inquisitive about these illnesses because even if these are not recognized by mainstream medicine, the ailments are very real as far as people are concerned, causing suffering and may even be cited as the cause of death, as in the case of "bangungot."

Alongside numerous diseases recognized by Filipino folk medicine, pasma is attributed to an interaction of "init" (heat) and "lamig" (cold). Under certain conditions, the body's muscles (kalamnan) are said to be "hot" and should not be too quickly brought into contact with "cold", in this case usually meaning cold water or air conditioners.

== Symptoms and causes ==
The most common symptoms of pasma are hand tremors, sweaty palms, numbness and pains. "Pasma" is thus very different from the Spanish term espasmo, which means "spasm".

Aside from the cause of "init" and "lamig", which is a traditional concept sufficiently intact in the contemporary Philippine psyche to be accepted, alone as a cause for pasma, some association has been noted with diseases already recognized by contemporary medicine. For example, symptoms of pasma are comparable to those found in people with diabetes mellitus and thyroid dysfunction. It has also been suggested that the symptoms are often neurological in nature and may be associated to some kind of nervous dysfunction. There are several traditional practices and beliefs that people follow as ways to help prevent or avoid experiencing pasma. These include avoiding tiring, repetitive movements of the upper extremities, showering and bathing in the morning, and not washing hands after ironing. Folkloric treatments for Pasma include massages using ginger, coconut oil, alcohol, garlic, and camphor oil. Soaking in tepid salted water or rice water is believed to cure Pasma, as well as Pasmang-bituka, a daily salted decoction of solasi (Holy basil).

== See also ==
- Bangungot
- Usog
