= Health indicator =

Measure of quality of health, or magnitude of public health change caused by actions

Health indicators are quantifiable characteristics of a population which researchers use as supporting evidence for describing the health of a population. Typically, researchers will use a survey methodology to gather information about a population sample, use statistics in an attempt to generalize the information collected to the entire population, and then use the statistical analysis to make a statement about the health of the population. Health indicators are often used by governments to guide health care policy or to make goals for improving population health.

== Characteristics ==
A health indicator which will be used internationally to describe global health should have the following characteristics:

1. It should be defined in such a way that it can be measured uniformly internationally.
2. It must have statistical validity.
3. The indicator must be data which can feasibly be collected in a reasonable amount of time.
4. The analysis of the data must result in a recommendation on which people can make changes to improve health

== Health indicator examples ==
*This is not a comprehensive list of health indicators.

=== Health status ===
- Life expectancy at birth
  - Number of years a newborn is expected to live based on current mortality trends.
- Infant mortality rate
  - Number of infant deaths (children under 1 year) per 1,000 live births in a year.
- Neonatal mortality rate
  - Number of newborn deaths (children under 28 days) per 1,000 births in a year.
- Maternal mortality ratio
  - Number of women who die due to pregnancy or birth complications per 100,000 births in a year.
- Mortality from cardiovascular diseases
- Cancer incidence
- Diabetes incidence
- Depression incidence
- Disability adjusted life years (DALY)
  - A measurement of premature death or lower quality of life due to disability.
- Activities of daily living (ADL)
  - A measurement of ability to self-sustain based on ability to perform daily activities such as dressing, feeding, and grooming.

=== Risk factors ===
- Alcohol consumption
- Smoking in adults
- Physical exercise habits
- Condom use
- Obesity rate
- Asthma rate
- High blood pressure rate
- Air pollution levels
- Exclusive breastfeeding rate
  - Number of mothers who only feed their infants breast milk for the first 6 months of life per a unit of measurement.
- Child stunting rate
  - Number of children who have a low height for their age (more than two standard deviations below the international reference) due to poor nutrition per a unit of measurement.
- Child wasting rate
  - Number of children who have a low weight for their height (more than two standard deviations below the international reference) due to poor nutrition per a unit of measurement.

=== Health systems ===
- Healthcare coverage
  - Number of people with some type of health care coverage/insurance per unit of measurement.
- Hospital beds per capita
- Doctors per capita
- Nurses per capita
- Hospital readmission rates
- Health expenditure as percentage of GDP
  - Percentage of a nation’s gross domestic product (GDP) used toward healthcare.
- People with HIV aware of their status
- Breast cancer screening rate
- Birth registration rate
  - Number of people with a government- verified birth certificate per unit of measurement.
- Death registration rate
  - Number of people with a government- verified death certificate per unit of measurement.

== Applications ==
Health indicators are commonly used to make large-scale or community health-related decisions. By describing the current health of a population, the areas that need improvement become evident, and policy-makers and health professionals can work to fill these gaps. Once interventions are put in place to try to improve the health of a population, health indicators can then be used to evaluate the success of the intervention.

Additionally, health indicators can highlight health disparities in a population. Differences in health indicators among genders, races, ethnic groups, socioeconomic classes, and other groups can be used to guide policy and interventions that will bring health equity in the future.

Health indicators are used by many institutions, including international organizations such as the United Nations and World Health Organization (WHO). They are also used by smaller-scale community health organizations, hospitals, and other medical and public health organizations such as the Center for Disease Control (CDC), National Institute of Health (NIH), The African Comprehensive HIV/AIDS Partnerships (ACHAP), and Global Alliance for Africa.
