= 2030 United States census =

25th United States national census

Twenty-fifth census of the United States
- April 1, 2030
- Seal of the U.S. Census Bureau

General information
- Country: United States

The 2030 United States census, known as "Census 2030", will be the 25th United States national census. National Census Day, the reference day which is used for the census, will be on April 1, 2030.

== Background ==
As required by Article I, Section 2 of the United States Constitution, the US census has been conducted every 10 years since 1790. The 2020 census was the previous census completed. All persons in the US age 18 years and older are legally obligated to answer census questions, and to do so truthfully (Title 13 of the United States Code).

Personally identifiable information could be made available in 2102, if the 72-year rule is not changed before then.

== Phases ==
=== Early planning ===
Early planning started in October 2018, followed by a design selection phase which is currently under way. Public input was collected between August and November 2022 to inform the Census Bureau's decisions on the operational design of the 2030 census, including which languages should be used to collect census data.

=== Design changes ===
In January 2023, a notice in the Federal Register proposed separate checkboxes in the race or ethnicity question for "Hispanic or Latino" as well as "Middle Eastern or North African". On March 28, 2024, the Bureau announced the following modifications to questions on race and ethnicity:

- consolidate the race and ethnicity questions into one question, with Hispanic or Latino considered as a minimum category
- add Middle Eastern or North African as a new minimum category
- require the collection of additional details beyond the minimum required race and ethnicity in most situations

In February 2026, it was announced that there was a push to add questions about the participants' citizenship status and to exclude immigrants without legal status for the first time in history. They also announced consideration to exclude the ethnicity options "Hispanic or Latino" and "Middle Eastern or North African". In September 2026, the second Trump Administration proposed eliminating the race and ethnicity questions from the 2030 US Census altogether.
