= Health care in the Philippines =

Health care in the Philippines varies with private, public and barangay health centers (many in rural municipalities). Most of the national burden of health care is provided by private health providers, with the cost shouldered by the state or by patients. The Philippine healthcare system, a blend of public and private sectors, faces challenges in providing equitable and comprehensive care. Historically rooted in traditional medicine and shaped by colonial influences, the system now navigates a landscape where private providers shoulder much of the burden, with costs borne by the state or patients. Despite the UHC Act's intent to improve care for all, the system remains fragmented, with significant disparities in service quality and quantity between the wealthy and the poor. Factors contributing to this include low budgets, personnel shortages exacerbated by nurse migration, and historical neglect of underserved populations. Compared to developed nations, the Philippines allocates a comparatively small percentage of its GDP to healthcare. Addressing these challenges remains a priority for the nation.

== History ==
=== Pre-Spanish Era: pre-1565 ===
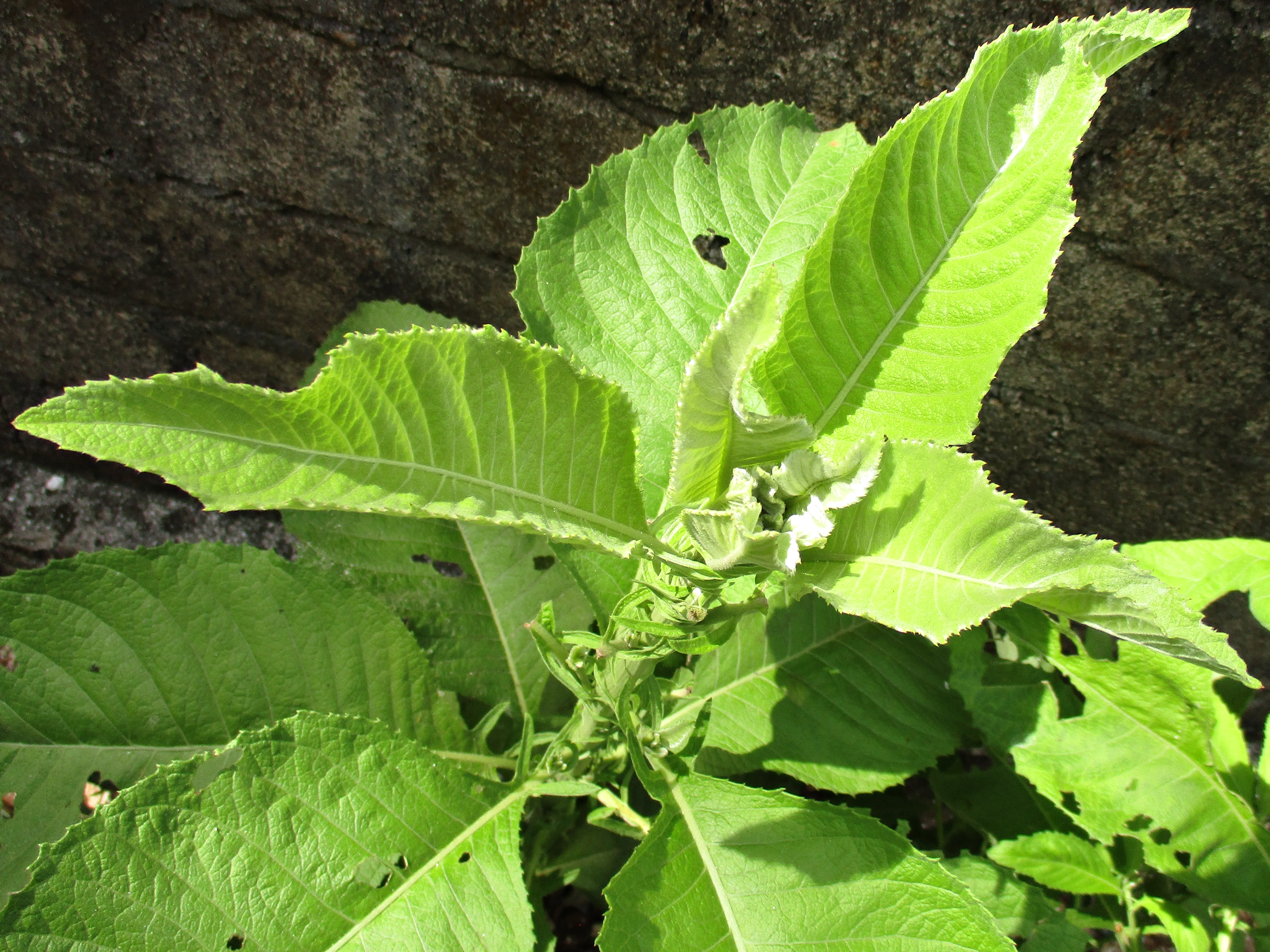
Sambong (Blumea balsamifera)

Pre-colonial Philippine healthcare, dating back to the 15th century, centered on traditional herbal remedies and a belief in the interconnectedness of nature. Filipinos utilized various plants for medicinal purposes: anonas leaves for indigestion, betel and areca nut leaves for injuries, and sambong for ailments like kidney stones and hypertension. Spanish accounts noted the natives' extensive medicinal knowledge, including effective poison antidotes such as igasud seeds, palanigan bark, and bagosabak bark. Despite this, the Spanish believed in imposing Western healthcare practices.

=== Spanish Era: 1565–1898 ===
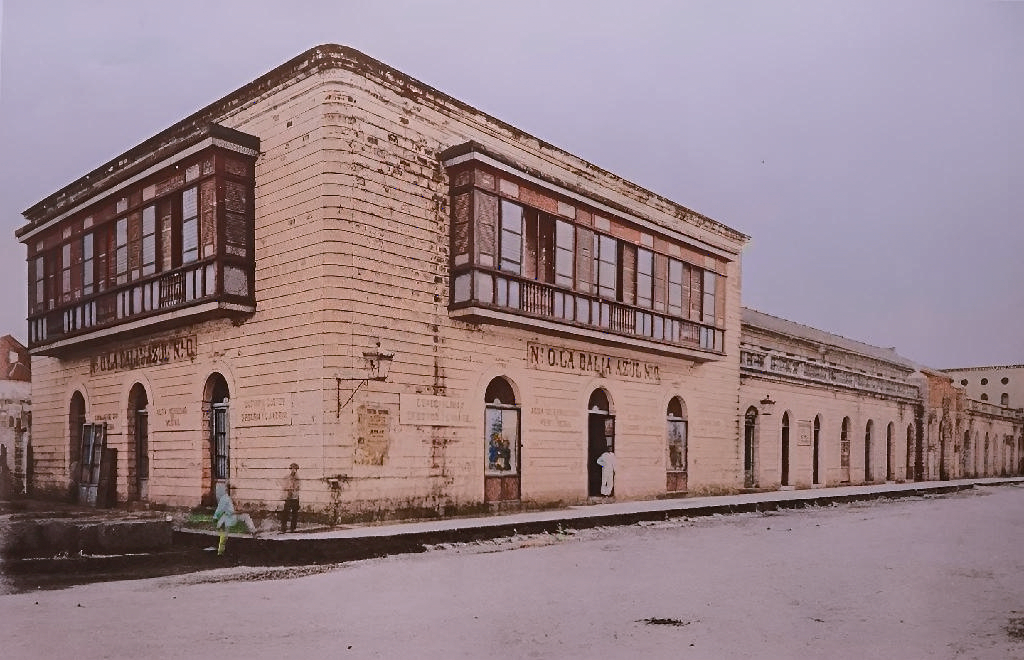
Hospital de San Juan de Dios in Manila.

To address foreign diseases in the Philippines, the Spanish established hospitals, often managed by friars. The Hospital Real, the first hospital in Philippines built in Cebu in 1565 and later relocated to Manila where it was destroyed by an earthquake in 1863, initially served only Spanish soldiers and sailors, facing financial and staffing challenges. Hospital de Naturales, founded by Fray Juan Clemente in 1578, provided free medical care to natives, receiving royal patronage and supplying other institutions. After a fire and an influx of Japanese lepers, it was renamed Hospital de San Lazaro, which endured demolitions due to invasions and military use. The modern San Lazaro Hospital is now located on Rizal Avenue in Manila, on land believed to have been donated by a leper.

In 1884, a Royal Order mandated free medical assistance for the poor, prompted by the 1882 Manila cholera epidemic. This led to regulations requiring municipal physicians to provide free services to impoverished families. Spanish military and civilian physicians were dispatched, with the latter forming a medical academic society in 1893. By 1876, public physicians were appointed across provinces, coinciding with the emergence of Filipino physicians, some from wealthy families and others from the educated "illustrado" class.

=== American Era: 1898–1918 ===
Following Spanish rule, the Filipino Revolutionary Government established a Bureau of Public Health, but the Americans soon took control, forming a Board of Health in 1898. Their initial focus was combatting smallpox through vaccination. Despite efforts, poor sanitation and disease outbreaks persisted, including bubonic plague and leprosy. The Board of Health for the Philippine Islands, later the Insular Board of Health, was established in 1901, with Americans taking primary responsibility for public health policies due to perceived Filipino physician incompetence. They implemented sanitary legislation and disease prevention strategies, including quarantines. The cholera epidemic revealed public resistance to American health measures, driven by superstition that many of the diseases cannot be cured by human intervention but by deep devotion to Jesus Christ and distrust of Americans. This led to extensive educational campaigns by the Bureau of Health to counter misinformation.

=== Filipinization of health: 1918–1941 ===
Under the Jones Law, self-governance increased, with the Philippine Health Service managed by the Department of Public Instruction. Dr. Victor Heiser oversaw the construction of the Philippine General Hospital. Filipinization of health services began with Dr. Vicente de Jesus's directorship in 1919. Governor-General Leonard Wood prioritized health education and prevention, notably through Act No. 3029, which mandated annual school health examinations, and the establishment of the School of Public Health and Hygiene. Governor-General Theodore Roosevelt Jr. consolidated medical agencies into the Bureau of Health and Public Welfare, focusing on public health education via "The Health Messenger" and other media. In 1939, Commonwealth Act 430 established the Department of Health and Public Welfare, coinciding with the Philippines' path to independence under the Tydings-McDuffie Act. By now, the Tydings-McDuffie Act had been ratified, and the Philippines was on its way to independence.

=== Philippine Republic (1946–present) ===
After gaining independence in 1946, the Philippines faced severe health challenges due to wartime destruction. The government allocated funds for rehabilitation, and health officials prioritized communicable diseases, emphasizing comprehensive solutions. Despite increased health budgets under President Quirino, facility shortages persisted. President Diosdado Macapagal's Republic Act 4073 in 1964 liberalized Hansen's disease treatment, promoting private care and integrating control into rural health centers. By 1987, the Philippine Constitution recognized healthcare access as a human right.

== Healthcare services ==
=== Public funding ===
The Philippines' public healthcare system is primarily financed through taxes and delivered by government facilities. The Department of Health oversees government hospitals, while provincial and municipal governments manage district, provincial, and primary care facilities.

Observers have cited government budget misprioritization, mishandling of funds, and corruption as culprits behind the country's bad healthcare.

=== Medical fee ===
The private sector is market-oriented, with healthcare paid for through user fees. The Philippine Health Insurance Corporation (PhilHealth) was established in 1995 to provide financial protection for Filipinos, and its membership has grown significantly in recent years.

=== Infrastructure ===
As of 2018, the Philippines has 1,224 hospitals, 2587 health centers, and 20,216 health stations. Most hospitals are small, with 64% being Level 1 non-departmental hospitals. The private sector's share of hospital beds has increased from 46% to 53%. As of 2026, the Philippines has a total of 105,000 hospital beds and a shortage of more than 400,000 hospital beds.

The distribution of healthcare resources is uneven. Luzon, particularly the National Capital Region, has a higher concentration of hospital beds compared to the Visayas and Mindanao. Public medical centers have a higher bed occupancy rate and longer patient stays than private hospitals.

=== Public healthcare delivery ===
The 3 levels of public hospitals, Malasakit Center and Barangay health volunteer play a vital role.

=== Universal healthcare ===
2019 Universal Health Care Act (UHC Act) was signed into law by President Rodrigo Duterte as the Republic Act No. 11223. UHC automatically enrolls all Filipino citizens in the National Health Insurance Program and expands the existing Philippine Health Insurance Corporation (PhilHealth) coverage to include free medical consultations and laboratory tests. The goal of the law is to expand the health benefits package of previous PhilHealth including access to services in preventive, palliative, and rehabilitative medicine. Development of the bill was guided by the World Health Organization – Philippines who assisted by mediating public hearings and providing insight from successful implementations of UHC in other countries. The law also seeks to undo certain medical practices that were originally established during colonial times, namely the reliance on private healthcare and a weak system of public healthcare.

The 2019 Universal Health Care Act (UHC Act) represents a significant effort to bridge the quality and accessibility gap, aiming to enroll all Filipinos in the National Health Insurance Program (PhilHealth). However, disparities persist, particularly between urban and rural areas, and funding constraints continue to impact service delivery. The Philippine healthcare system categorizes hospitals into three distinct levels, reflecting their capabilities and resources, with Level 1 representing basic care and Level 3 the most advanced. The essential criteria for each level are:

- Level 1 Hospitals in Philippines: These facilities are required to possess an operating theater, maternity wards, and a functional clinical laboratory. They must also maintain a qualified medical team, under the leadership of a licensed physician, and adhere to bed capacity guidelines set by the Department of Health (DOH).
- Level 2 Hospitals in Philippines: Building upon the foundational requirements of Level 1, these hospitals provide departmentalized specialty services, intensive care units (ICU), respiratory therapy, advanced tertiary clinical laboratory services, and enhanced imaging capabilities.
- Level 3 Hospitals in Philippines: As the most comprehensive, these institutions incorporate all the features of Level 1 and 2 hospitals, while also offering teaching and training programs for physicians in the primary medical specializations. They are mandated to have a blood bank, ambulatory surgery clinic (for outpatient procedures), a dialysis unit, and sophisticated Level 3 imaging and laboratory facilities. These hospitals are designed to manage complex medical cases, providing a wider range of patient care.

Beyond these levels, Philippine hospitals are further differentiated by their ownership structure (government/public vs private) and the breadth of medical services they offer (generic vs specialised vs emergency, etc.).

=== Medical education ===
Medical education in Philippines is principally offered and developed by accredited and government recognized medical schools in the country.

Medical schools in the Philippines are professional schools offering the Doctor of Medicine (M.D.) degree. The M.D. is a four-year and six months professional degree program which qualifies the degree holder to take the licensure exam for medical doctors in the Philippines.

Health professionals are one of the biggest exports of the Philippines and a significant source of tax revenue for the government which subsidises medical education.

== Health care workers ==
As of 2023, the Philippines has a demand for 189,548 physicians and a shortage of 114,000. The demand for nurses is at 300,708 nurses with a shortage of 127,000. Emigration of health care workers contributes to the physician and nursing shortage.

Health care workers in government hospitals are overworked and receive low wages, according to the Alliance of Health Workers, and contend with inadequate social support, medical equipment, and supplies, according to Filipino Nurses United. Health care workers in the public sector receive starting salaries of ₱32,097.

=== Barangay health worker ===
A barangay health worker (BHW), or a barangay health volunteer, is a health care provider in the Philippines. BHWs undergo a basic training program under an accredited government or non-government organization and render primary care services in the community. They provide services such as first aid, maternal, neonatal, and child health care, as well as community-based interventions, including immunization clinics in barangays.

=== Dentistry ===
Dentistry in the Philippines can be divided into five periods of dental practice. Using the timeline of Philippine history as a template, they are: the Pre-Spanish era (from the Prehistoric period to the Classical period), the Spanish era, the American era, the Japanese occupation era (during World War II) and the independent Philippine-Republics era.

=== Nursing ===
Nursing in the Philippines is provided by professionally trained nurses, who also provide a quarter of the world's overseas nurses. Every year, some 20,000 nurses work in other countries. Nurses in the Philippines are licensed by the Professional Regulatory Commission. The advance of nursing in the Philippines as a career was pioneered by a culture of care that is intrinsic in the Filipino people. This began before Spanish colonization.

=== Physical therapy ===
The history of physical therapy in the Philippines relates how physical therapy started in the Philippines and how it evolved as a profession through three significant phases in the history of the Philippines: from the American era leading to the Japanese occupation of the islands during World War II, and up to the modern-day time period of the independent Philippine Republics. It was introduced in the Philippines ahead of rehabilitation medicine.

== Issues ==
=== Disparity in healthcare quality for rich vs poor ===
The World Health Organization characterizes Philippine healthcare as "fragmented," revealing a stark disparity in service quality and quantity between the wealthy and the poor. Contributing factors include insufficient budgets, personnel shortages due to nurse migration, and systemic neglect of the impoverished. This fragmentation underscores the continuous struggle to meet international healthcare standards.

=== Rural and urban disparity and funding bias ===
Despite the Universal Health Care (UHC) system, persistent challenges plague Philippine healthcare. Rural areas suffer from limited resources, and funding decisions are often influenced by private interests, hindering equitable distribution. Accreditation difficulties for rural health stations limit patient coverage. Moreover, even with UHC, a significant portion of Filipinos lack regular medical check-ups, highlighting the need for a cohesive strategy to synchronize health system aspects and address core performance issues. Escalating costs for comprehensive benefits further strain the system. Statistics showed that 8 out of 10 Filipinos have had no medical check-up or physical examination in their life even with the addition of UHC. Progress toward effective and equitable UHC needs not only strong political commitment but also a coherent strategy to ensure different aspects of health systems are synchronized with each other and address core performance challenges. Deficits resulting from escalating costs by the system are a significant challenge in the face of increasing demands for comprehensive benefits such as hemodialysis, breast cancer treatments, and others.

=== Lack of public healthcare infrastructure ===
A significant portion of healthcare expenses remains the responsibility of patients, as evidenced by the Philippine Institute for Development Studies. The country's healthcare spending, at 4.7% of GDP in 2014, pales in comparison to developed nations like the US and Canada. The 2019 UHC Act aims to bridge this gap, but the lack of adequate public healthcare infrastructure continues to be a major impediment. Efforts are being performed to bridge the gap. On February 20, 2019, the Universal Health Care (UHC) Bill was signed into law, aiming to provide proper healthcare services for all.

== See also ==
- Health in the Philippines
  - Mental health care in the Philippines
  - Dentistry in the Philippines
  - List of hospitals in the Philippines
  - Barangay health volunteer
  - Malasakit Center
- General
  - History of medicine in the Philippines
  - Medical education in the Philippines
