= Philippines and the Asian Development Bank =

The Philippines is one of the first countries that joined the Asian Development Bank (ADB) in 1966. According to the ADB, the Philippines has heavily relied on the ADB for development assistance, borrowing a total of $19.3 billion in the last decade. The Philippines has been commended by the ADB for being a fast-growing economy despite increasing inflation and a plummeting global economy. The ADB also deemed the country one of its "special" partners; it is the location of their headquarters. The IMF considered it one of 24 emerging countries.

== ADB projects in the Philippines ==
Since its founding, the ADB has been heavily involved in the modernization and development initiatives in the Philippines.

=== Agriculture ===
In 1968 an ADB project aimed to improve the country's irrigation system, mostly in rural areas. It was believed to improve many aspects of rural economies by providing access to education and healthcare.

=== Transportation ===
After discovering that the Philippines' transportation system was in poor condition, the ADB proposed the EDSA Greenways Project, to improve commuter facilities for safer, more efficient and comfortable pedestrian travel. The ADB deemed all water, air, and land transportation in the Philippines outdated; most of the day, roads become impassable and congested due to the lack of other effective transportation infrastructures/methods. The ADB is also reviving and building railways to connect provinces and provide access to and from the cities.

=== Education ===
The ADB created a program called Facilitating Youth School-to-Work Transition Program. This program facilitates job training for out-of-school, at-risk, and less fortunate youth. In the long run, this project aims to maintain the economic growth in the country.

=== Governance reform ===
The ADB's current Local Governance Reform Program was created in order to provide quality service to local communities, and also promote the establishment of new businesses in different areas in the country.

=== Emergency assistance ===
In helping to restore order after the 2017 urban war between the Philippine Armed Forces and ISIL, the ADB provided the Philippines emergency assistance in the form of loans and grants. This monetary assistance covers the reconstruction and recovery of Marawi, its transportation system, health system, and the restoration of the province's livelihood and education.
