= Traditional Asian medicine =

Folk medicine of Asian origin

Traditional Asian medicine is a collective term for several types of traditional medicine practiced in Asia.

These include the medical traditions of:

- East Asia
  - China
    - Tibet
  - Japan (Kampo)
  - Korea
  - Mongolia
- Southeast Asia
  - Cambodia
  - Indonesia (Jamu)
  - Thailand
  - Vietnam
- South Asia
  - Ayurveda
  - Tamil Nadu (Siddha)
- West Asia
  - Middle East (Unani)
  - Iran

== See also ==
- History of medicine in the Philippines
- Pharmacognosy
