= Technology in veterinary medicine =

Many of the technologies used in human medicine are also used in the veterinary field, although often in slightly different ways. Veterinarians use a variety of technologies for diagnostic and therapeutic purposes to better understand and improve the health of their animal patients. Recent trends in veterinary technology have moved towards the integration of hand-held devices and consumer based technology to monitor pets and interact with veterinarians.

== General tools ==
Thermometer	The electronic thermometer is most commonly used in veterinary practice for both large and small animals. Typically temperatures are taken rectally
Stethoscope	In veterinary medicine the acoustic stethoscope has a variety of uses, including auscultating the heart and lungs and listening to gut sounds. Different ear pieces and lumens may be employed according to the function
Laryngoscope	Laryngoscope Laryngoscopes are typically used in veterinary practices during the process of intubation prior to surgery. Before laryngoscopes are used, the correct sized blades must be determined as they come in a variety of sizes.
Centrifuge	A centrifuge is commonly used in veterinary practices in order to prepare blood samples for analysis. Components of the blood are separated using high velocities and centrifugal force
Autoclave	A machine that uses high pressures and temperatures to sterilize surgical equipment. Prior to autoclaving surgical instruments are cleaned and may be sorted and grouped by surgical procedure
Glucometer	A tool used to approximate blood glucose levels, often in order to manage type 1 and type 2 diabetes mellitus

== Common diagnostic technologies ==
X-Ray	An example of an X-ray from a dog. A form of electromagnetic radiation used to examine internal structures such as bones, blood vessels and some organs. In veterinary medicine, restraint methods such as sand bags, tying, manual restraint, and medications are used to increase easy of restraint
Ultrasound	Ultrasonic vibrations diagnostically used to examine internal organs by creating a picture. Better at differentiating between fluids and tissue masses than X-rays.
ECG	Electrodes are used to monitor the rate and rhythm of a patient’s heart
BP Monitor	A device that uses an inflatable cuff to measure blood pressure
Biochemistry Analyzer	Blood samples provided to these devices are assessed on various parameters including levels of various substances and hormones. Can also be used during serum biochemistry tests which evaluate a number of different conditions including renal function and serum proteins.
Pulse Oximeter	A machine used to measure the level of oxygen in an animal’s bloodstream using a sensor that attaches to the device on one end and the animal on the other.
Refractometer	A handheld refractometer. A drop of the sample is placed on the sample screen and is distributed by the plastic cover. A handheld version of this tool is used to measure the amount of protein present in the blood and urine

== Emerging technologies ==
Emerging Trends	Trend Description	Examples of these Trends Emerging in Veterinary Medicine
Vets on Demand	Contact a vet at any time to have them pay you an at-home visit	VetPronto: call this company to have a vet come to your house for a vet visit
Telehealth	Contact a vet or vet technician to give advice remotely about health questions or to receive care and education Subcategories include teleconsulting, telecommunication, teleadvice, teletriage, e-Prescribing, and mHealth.	Treat: text a vet questions regarding your animal’s health and wellness
Telemedicine	The exchange of medical information using an electronic device. Used to monitor patients and communicate with owners. Allows for more convenient diagnosis, treatments, and scheduling.	Skype: allows a vet to see your pet and their behaviors Medici: text vets to get a diagnosis and possible treatments
Point-of-Care Testing	Diagnostic testing that occurs patient-side and gives quick results	Petnostics: offers a line of at-home urinalysis tests to test for UTIs, diabetes & bladder stones, read through a phone app
Sensors/Wearables	A device that senses the presence of an animal and communicates the information collected in a useful way	Whistle: a wearable tracker that attaches to the collar and tracks the animal’s movements via GPS which is monitorable via phone app
Precision Medicine	Medicine that is tailored to the individual animal, with decisions being made accordingly	Embark: a DNA test for dogs that explores individual breed and health traits

== See also ==
- Health technology
- Veterinary medicine
- Veterinary physician
- Veterinary technician
- Animal technology
