= Veterinary medicine in the United Kingdom =

British legal framework for the practice of animal medicine

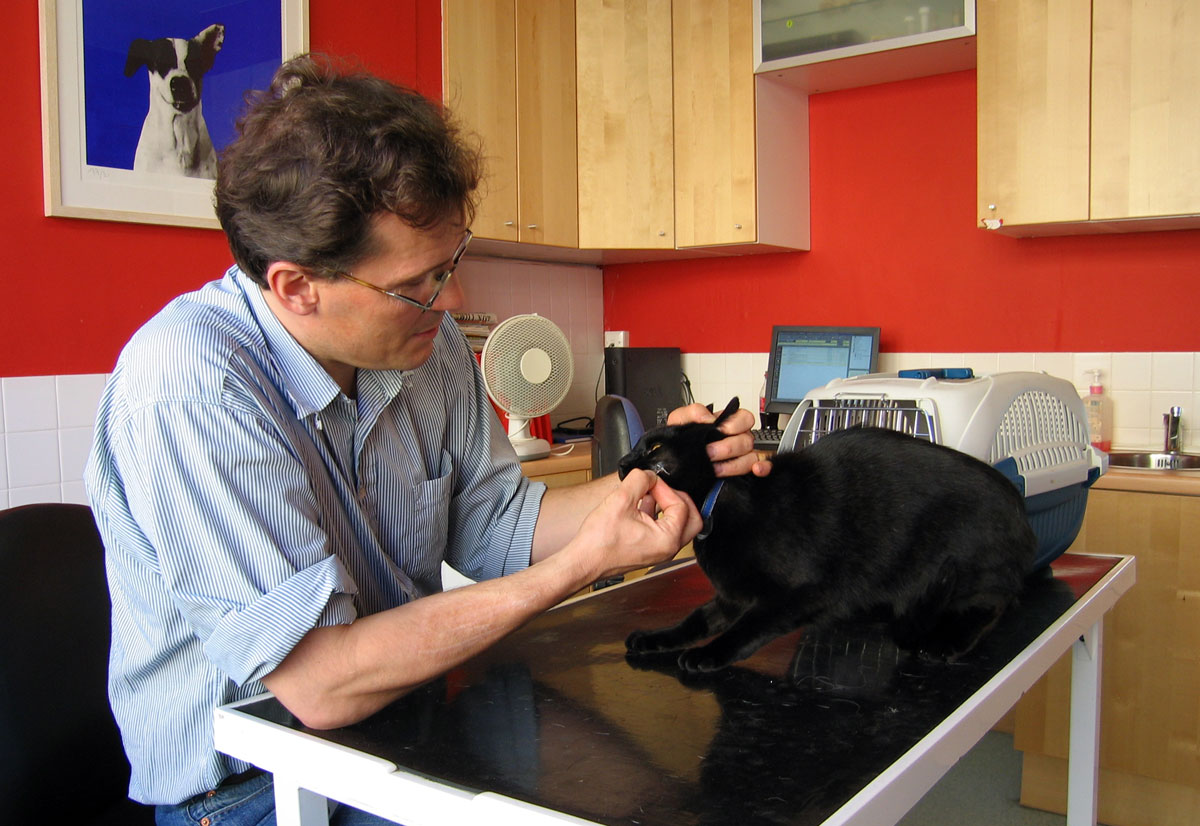
A veterinary surgeon removes stitches from a cat's face following minor surgery on an abscess.

Veterinary medicine in the United Kingdom is the performance of veterinary medicine by licensed professionals. It is strictly regulated by the statute law, notably the Veterinary Surgeons Act 1966. Veterinary medicine is led by veterinary physicians, termed "veterinary surgeons" (with a different meaning to how it is used in some other anglophone countries, where it denotes a surgical specialist), normally referred to as "vets".

Vets are often assisted by registered veterinary nurses, who are able to both assist the vet and to autonomously practise a range of skills of their own, including minor surgery under direction from a responsible vet.

Other professionals are also permitted to perform some animal treatment, through exemptions in the law, and these include manipulation techniques such as physiotherapy, chiropractic and osteopathy. Other alternative medicine therapies, such as homeopathy, acupuncture, phytotherapy and aromatherapy may only be performed by a licensed veterinary surgeon.

The practice of veterinary medicine in the United Kingdom is regulated by the Royal College of Veterinary Surgeons (RCVS), which licenses both veterinary surgeons and veterinary nurses.

== Veterinary surgeons ==
In order to practise veterinary medicine in the UK, a veterinary surgeon must hold a current registration with the RCVS. This requires a qualifying degree, usually in veterinary science or veterinary medicine. From March 2015, veterinary surgeons registered with the RCVS in the UK may optionally use the courtesy title Dr. This makes it the third clinical degree in the UK, after medicine and dentistry, to allow the use of the title Dr. The origins of veterinary surgeons parallel to human surgery are reflected in human medicine where qualified surgeons also drop their Dr designation and revert to their original title.

=== Education ===
Veterinary medicine degree courses are usually five years in length, holders of a science degree may take a four-year accelerated course and all intercalated degrees take six years. There are a limited number of places on veterinary courses each year, with only ten UK universities accredited/pending to offer degrees. Two other Veterinary Schools are being developed.

==== Degree courses ====
- Aberystwyth, in association with Royal Veterinary College – BVSc commenced 2021 (accreditation due 2026)
- Bristol
- Cambridge
- Edinburgh
- Glasgow
- Harper and Keele Veterinary School – BVetMS, commenced 2020 (accreditation due 2025)
- Liverpool
- Nottingham
- Royal Veterinary College in London
- University of Surrey

==== Degree courses under development ====
- Scotland's Rural College (SRUC) – BVSci, starts September 2023
- University of Central Lancashire – BVMS, starts September 2023

==== CPD ====
Continuing professional development (CPD) is a mandatory and key part of career development. The RCVS requires a minimum of 35 hours CPD each calendar year. The RCVS Professional Development Phase (PDP) that was launched for new graduates in 2007 provides a structured approach to guide the new graduate towards the professional competences they need to develop in either small animal, equine or production animal practice.

=== Specialism ===
Vets may choose to specialise in various areas of veterinary medicine, through certificate qualifications, modular certificates or diplomas, with each speciality taking around two years to complete. Certificates cover a wide range of areas, including small animal medicine, small animal surgery, large animal medicine, welfare ethics and law, public health, cardiology, orthopaedics and advanced veterinary practice (Cert AVP).

There is a large and potentially confusing array of post-nominal titles in the UK veterinary profession. Levels of credibility vary. In particular, Certificate level qualification does not qualify a veterinary surgeon as a specialist. With further training, extensive professional experience and by publishing articles in a particular subject area, it is possible to gain Royal College of Veterinary Surgeons (RCVS) Recognised Specialist Status. In 2012, the ruling council of the RCVS adopted a report from the Calman Committee into specialisation in the UK veterinary profession, accepting that only those veterinary surgeons recognised by the RCVS as specialists and placed on a register held by the RCVS could be truly held up as "Specialist".

Vets may undertake the training to become an Official Veterinarian (OV) which authorises them to carry out tasks on behalf of the Department for Environment, Food and Rural Affairs, such as testing cattle for tuberculosis or issuing of documentation for the export of animals and animal products.

=== Employment ===
Most veterinary surgeons work in private practice, either in a general practice, or specialising in one type of animal (small animal, equine, zoo animal etc.). Newly qualified veterinary surgeons usually work as assistants for some time before being offered the opportunity to become a partner or a principal. Becoming a partner involves increased responsibility, the need for more business and management skills and a financial input into the practice.

Some vets are also employed by animal welfare charities who offer treatment to the public, such as Royal Society for the Prevention of Cruelty to Animals (RSPCA), the People's Dispensary for Sick Animals (PDSA) and The Blue Cross.

There are also opportunities to work for government services, including APHA (the Animal and Plant Health Agency) who are responsible for the control and eradication of major notifiable diseases, animal welfare, promotion of international trade and certain public health functions related to residues in meat and investigation of food safety incidents, and scanning surveillance, or the Veterinary Medicines Directorate (VMD) who license veterinary medicines.

It is also possible to pursue a research and/or teaching career within universities or research bodies.

== Veterinary nurses ==
Veterinary Nurses are the primary paraveterinary workers in the United Kingdom and work alongside vets. Veterinary Nurses must be registered and follow a strict code of conduct. Veterinary Nurses have a scope of autonomous practice within which they can act for the animals they treat. Under schedule 3 of the Veterinary Surgeons Act they can perform many complex procedures include minor surgery, admission of intravenous fluid therapy and parenteral nutrition, performing diagnostic imaging and monitoring anaesthesia.

Preventative medicine is also an important part of the veterinary nurse's role, with nurse clinics and consultations becoming increasingly common. The cost of preventative and routine treatments can vary considerably between practices and regions. Nurse-led clinics may cover such areas as nutrition and weight management, management of the diabetic or senior patient, parasite control, vaccinations, puppy and kitten socialisation, dental care and wound care.

=== Registration ===
All veterinary nurses must be registered with the Royal College of Veterinary Surgeons (RCVS). Registered Veterinary Nurses have dispensations in law (the Veterinary Surgeons Act 1966, amended in 2002) to undertake certain procedures to include minor surgery and anaesthesia on animals under veterinary direction. Registered Veterinary Nurses (RVNs) are bound by a code of professional conduct and are obliged to maintain their professional knowledge and skills through ongoing CPD. Those VN's listed after 2002 are automatically registered.

=== Education ===
RVNs train for the Register through either a two to three year further education diploma programme or via a qualifying foundation or honours degree which can be three to four years. All student nurses must complete a minimum of 2100 hours of work experience in general veterinary practice during their training.

RCVS badges are engraved with the nurse's personal badge number, and as of 2012 are available with the additional engraving ‘registered’ for RVNs.

VN's can further their formal training and gain additional postnominal letters by completing one of many specialist certificates and/or by achieving the RCVS Diploma in Advanced Veterinary Nursing (DipAVN) by following a course of study in one or more of three pathways: Small animal nursing, Equine nursing, and Veterinary nursing education. The streamlined RCVS DipAVN replaced the DipAVN(Medical) and DipAVN(Surgical) formerly administered by the BVNA up until 2005. The DipAVN is offered through Myerscough College in Lancashire since 2007 and more recently through Harper Adams University, some modules are also available from the Royal Veterinary College in conjunction with the University of London.

=== Representation ===
UK Veterinary Nurses are represented by the British Veterinary Nursing Association (BVNA).

=== History ===
Prior to 1979, the term "nurse" was reserved for members of the General Nursing Council, but it was not until 1984 that the term "veterinary nurse" was permitted to be used.

== Veterinary assistants ==
Lay staff, without formal qualification or status may be called veterinary assistants (the BVNA approved term). These lay staff have usually undertaken some basic veterinary nurse education but are limited by law as to the procedures they may undertake on animals. They work alongside qualified vets and veterinary nurses to provide care and support to animal patients and their owners.

== See also ==
- Cattle Health Initiative
- National Office for Animal Health
- Royal College of Veterinary Surgeons
- Pet insurance
- Veterinary medicine in the United States
- History of veterinary medicine in the Philippines
