= History of veterinary medicine in the Philippines =

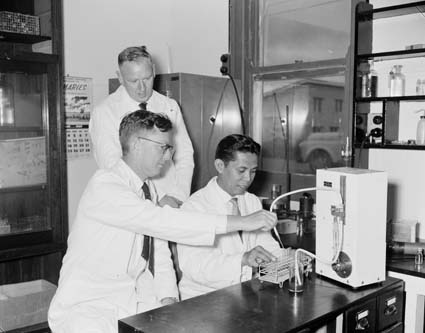
Filipino veterinary physician Dr. Alejandrino S. Quizon, Colombo Plan Fellow and a research veterinarian with the Laboratory Services Division of the Philippines Bureau of Animal Industries, was photographed in 1959 while he was nearing the end of a four-month Australian tour during which he had been studying cattle diseases. In the picture above, Dr. Quizon prepares to carry out a blood test while being assisted by two bacteriologists from the Queensland Animal Research Institute, namely Mr. G. C. Simmons, standing at rear, and Mr. C. G. Ludford, on the left.

The history of veterinary medicine in the Philippines discusses the history of veterinary medicine as a profession in the Philippines. Its history in the Philippines began in 1828, while the Philippines was still a colony of Spain, progressing further during the time when the Philippines became a territory of the United States, until the establishment of the Philippines as an independent Republic in the modern-day era.

== Spanish era (1521–1898) ==
Although there was a Spanish royal decree that was issued on May 31, 1828, assigning that there should be one veterinarian for the Philippine islands (a number later increased to two veterinarians in 1843) the highlight of the history of veterinary medicine in the Philippines was in 1888, when the need to investigate the occurrence of the rinderpest epizootic (cattle plague) in the Philippine islands emerged. The cattle plague that affected the cow and carabao (water buffalo) population between Manila and Bulacan were caused by sick animals that were imported from Indochina and Hong Kong. The Commission assigned to perform the investigation was appointed by Don Benigno Quiroga y Ballesteros, the Director General of the Administración Civil de Filipinas (Civil Administration of the Philippines) during that time. The commission was composed of an army veterinarian, a pharmacist, and a medical doctor. The army veterinarian and head of the commission was Don Gines Geis y Gotzens. The pharmacist was Don Anacleto del Rosario y Sales, who at the time was the Director of the Laboratorio Municipal de Manila (Municipal Laboratory of Manila). The physician was Don Francisco Masip, an official in-charge of public health. The 1888 cattle plague (also known as steppe murrain) prompted the need for the services of veterinarians in the Philippines, including those from the ranks (commissioned officers) of the Spanish Army. The effects of the plague lasted from 1888 through 1939, meaning it moved on from Spanish period up to the American period in the history of the Philippines. From 1901 to 1902 alone, more than 600,000 cattle and water buffaloes were killed by the disease.

== American era (1898–1946) ==
=== Veterinary functions ===
American occupation of the Philippines began in 1898. During the American period in Philippine history (1898–1946) the American government established the a veterinary department in 1899, a part of the Board of Health, the office that was in-charge of public health and safety. The government of the United States sent groups of American veterinary doctors to the Philippines to function as inspectors of cattle imported through Manila, as inspectors of both locally butchered and imported beef, as caretakers of the health of animals owned by the government (including the horses of American soldiers), and as sanitary inspectors of public and private stables. In 1899, 60 civilian American veterinarians were working hand-in-hand with the United States Army Veterinary Corps. In 1905, the veterinary department was placed under the management of the Bureau of Agriculture (known at present as the Bureau of Animal Industry).

=== Philippine Veterinary Medical Association ===
On September 7, 1907, the Philippine Veterinary Medical Association (PVMA) was established by a group composed of veterinarians from the US Army and veterinarians from the Insular Government. At the time, the acting Chief Veterinarian was Dr. C.M. Richards, and the chief of the Animal Husbandry Division was Dr. Frank C. Gearhart.

=== First veterinary school ===
In 1908, the College of Veterinary Science of the University of the Philippines was founded. On September 1, 1910, Dr. George E. Nesom, the first president of the Philippine Veterinary Medical Association (PVMA) and who was also the first Director of the Bureau of Agriculture was appointed as the chairman of the Committee on Forage and Committee on Beef, a committee that was a component of the Board of Officers of the Civil Government of the Philippines and the United States Army.

The UP College of Veterinary Science (later became known as the UP College of Veterinary Medicine) started to offer classes in 1910. Its first dean was Archibald Ward, an American veterinarian licensed to practice in the Philippines. Two other Americans after Ward became deans of the college. The college was first housed in Pandacan, Manila, which was later transferred to the Barlett Building built in Diliman, Quezon City (the Barlett Building was named after Murray Barlett, the first president of the University of the Philippines), before the college was moved to its current location in Los Baños, Laguna. The Veterinary Teaching Hospital (VTH) stayed in Diliman, Quezon City. From 1910 to 1960, the UP College of Veterinary Science was the only school of veterinary medicine in the Philippines. Between 1910 and 1960, the college produced 450 veterinarians. Among them was Dr. Teodulio Topacio Sr. Topacio, Sr. was one of the first four Filipinos to enroll in and graduated from the UP College of Veterinary Science.

=== Curriculum ===
The curriculum of the college for the Doctor of Veterinary Medicine (DVM) course started as a five-year education program. It became a four-year course in 1920. It became a six-year course in 1926 due to the combination of two degrees, namely the Bachelor of Science in Agriculture and the degree in Doctor of Veterinary Medicine. In 1960, the BS degree in Agriculture was removed but the course remained as a six-year program. The first two years of the 1960 program was pre-veterinary education involving studies of the liberal arts and the natural sciences, followed by a four-year intensive veterinary training studies.

=== Veterinary regulation board ===
As of February 11, 1913, the practice of veterinary medicine in the Philippines was being regulated by Public Act No. 2245, and resulted in the creation of the Veterinary Examining Board. The Veterinary Examining Board begun to function on November 4, 1913. The board was composed of appointees chosen by the Governor-General and was supervised administratively by the Director of Agriculture. The board was later managed by the Department of Agriculture and Commerce because of Public Act No. 4007, transferring the authority to appoint board members to its Department Secretary.

=== Pioneer veterinarians ===
By 1914, apart from the first graduates of the UP College of Veterinary Science which included Dr. Teodulio Topacio Sr., other Filipinos started to become active in the field of veterinary medicine in the Philippines. Some of them graduated from schools of medicine in the United States, such as Dr. Victor A. Buencamino (a graduate from the New York State College of Veterinary Medicine at Cornell University, 1911), Dr. Vicente G. Ferriols (a graduate from the Iowa State College of Agriculture and Mechanic Arts, 1912), Dr. Ventura T. Gatchalian, and Dr. Sixto N. Almeda Carlos (a graduate from The San Francisco Veterinary College, 1916). A Spaniard veterinarian residing in the Philippines, Mariano Juan Francisco Muñoz y Tomen, was also active in the Philippines in 1914. Some Filipino veterinarians stayed in the Philippines to practice their profession. Others migrated to the United States, Australia, and other countries that has a demand for their services.

=== Military veterinarians ===
In 1916, the veterinarian members of the Veterinary Corps of the US Army assigned to the Philippines were given military ranks (they previously did not have ranks in the US Army) and thus became commissioned military officers through the efforts of Dr. William Proctor Hill, the president of PVMA from 1910 to 1911. Dr. Hill, a graduate from the Ontario Veterinary College in Canada, was an advocate for the "regulation of the practice of veterinary medicine and surgery" in the Philippines.

=== Filipino veterinary officials ===
From 1907 to 1917, the PVMA were managed by American officials only. In 1918, two Filipinos (Dr. Victor A. Buencamino as vice-president and Dr. Sixto N. Almeda Carlos as treasure) became officers of the PVMA. In 1919, all officers of the PVMA were Filipinos: Dr. Victor A. Buencamino became the PVMA president while Dr. Vicente G. Ferriols became the vice-president; the two other Filipino PVMA officers elected were Dr. Angel K. Gomez (as secretary) and Dr. Santiago B. Montemayor (as treasurer).

== Independent Philippine-Republics era (1946-present) ==
=== Other veterinary schools ===
The Philippines became an independent nation on July 4, 1946. In the 1970s, there were already three veterinary schools in the Philippines. Apart from the first College of Veterinary Science that was established by the University of the Philippines in 1908, the other two were the veterinary colleges of the University of Eastern Philippines and of the Araneta University.

=== Regulation and ethics ===
During the years of the Fifth Philippine Republic (1986–present), the regulatory law called Public Act No. 2245 of 1913 was replaced by Philippine Republic Act No. 3892 on February 23, 1992. RA No. 3892 had also become known as the An Act to Regulate the Practice of Veterinary Medicine and Surgery in the Philippines. The Philippine Veterinary Medical Association that was founded in 1907 became an incorporation and became known as Philippine Veterinary Medical Association, Inc. On February 23, 1992, when the PVMA, Inc. ratified the Code of Ethics that should be followed by veterinary medicine professionals in the Philippines. The first members of the Philippine veterinary medicine Board of Ethics were Dr. Santiago Y. Rotea, Dr. Faustino Turla, and Dr. Anacleto B. Coronel, with Dr. Rotea functioning as chairman of the board.

=== Veterinary organizations ===
Several chapters of PVMA, Inc. had been established as the profession of veterinary medicine progressed during the period of modern-day Philippines. There had been a number of veterinary associations that become affiliates to PVMA, Inc. The first association to be affiliated to PVMA, Inc. was the Cebu Veterinary Medical Society, founded in November 1963 and was then headed by Dr. Nestor R. Alonzo as its president while seconded by Dr. Rosalio C. Mandin as vice-president.

From 1974 onward, there had been other independent veterinary organizations that affiliated themselves with PVMA, Inc. Among them were the City Veterinarians League (CVL, established in 1975), the Veterinary Practitioners Association of the Philippines (VPAP, established in 1972, formerly known as the Veterinary Private Practitioners Association when it was founded by private veterinary medicine practitioners), the Veterinary Women's League (VWL, established in 1973, which later became known as the Philippine Veterinary Women's Association, PVWA), the Philippine Animal Hospital Association (PAHA, established in 1978) and the Philippine Society of Veterinary Diagnosticians (PSVD, registered with PVMA, Inc. in 1981), the Veterinary Quarantine Officers of the Philippines (VQOP, established in 1986), and the Davao Veterinary Private Practitioners Association (DVPPA, established in 1984).

== See also ==
- Veterinary medicine in the United States

- History of veterinary medicine in Pennsylvania

- Veterinary medicine in the United Kingdom
- History of medicine in the Philippines
- History of dentistry in the Philippines

== Bibliography ==
- Manuel, Mauro, Mario Tongson, Teodulio Topacio Jr. and Grace de Ocampo (editors). A Century of Veterinary Medicine in the Philippines 1898-1998.
