= History of medicine in the Philippines =

The history of medicine in the Philippines discusses the folk medicinal practices and the medical applications used in Philippine society from the prehistoric times before the Spaniards were able to set a firm foothold on the islands of the Philippines for over 300 years, to the transition from Spanish rule to fifty-year American colonial embrace of the Philippines, and up to the establishment of the Philippine Republic of the present. Although according to Dr. José Policarpio Bantug in his book A Short History of Medicine in the Philippines During The Spanish Regime, 1565-1898, there were "no authentic monuments have come down to us that indicate with some certainty early medical practices" regarding the "beginnings of medicine in the Philippines". A historian from the United States named Edward Gaylord Borne described that the Philippines became "ahead of all the other European colonies" in providing healthcare to ill and invalid people during the start of the 17th century, a time period when the Philippines was a colony of Spain. From the 17th and 18th centuries, there had been a "state-of-the-art medical and pharmaceutical science" developed by Spanish friars based on Filipino curanderos (curandero being a Spanish term for a Filipino "folk therapist") that was "unique to the [Philippine] islands."

The Philippine shamans (known by several names in different languages i.e. katalonan, babaylans, etc.) were the first healers within the tribal communities of ancient Philippines. Later emerged folk doctors and the training and deployment of true medical practitioners as can be seen in the progression of Philippine history. At present, medical personnel trained based on Western medicine - such as Filipino nurses, physicians, physical therapists, pharmacists, surgeons among others - coexists with the still thriving group of traditional healers that do not have formal education in scientific medicine who often cater to people living in impoverished areas of the Philippines.

== Folk medicine ==
There are ten categories of non-medical traditional healers or folk doctors in the Philippines: the babaylan ("religious leader"), albularyo, the manghihilot or hilot (the traditional "massage therapists"), the magpapaanak (the traditional "midwife", also sometimes called a hilot), the mangluluop, the manghihila, the mangtatawas, the mediko, the faith healer, the local shaman healers (such as those that are from the Cordilleras). Most folk healers in Philippines believe that their "medicinal" and healing skills come from a supernatural being or given to them by God. Their practice and methods of curing ailments involves superstitions, recitation of prayers and religious rituals accompanied by the mediation of the Holy Spirit, herbology, hydrotherapy, massage therapy, and divination. Although often found active in rural communities, traditional Filipino healers can also be found in small urban and suburban neighborhoods. During Spanish times in the Philippines, the Spaniards refer to folk doctors or traditional as mediquillos ("herbal scientists"), herbolarios, and sometimes as "superstitious quacks". They were even called by the Spaniards simply as matanda (the "elder").

=== Babaylan ===
According to sociologist and anthropologist Marianita "Girlie" C. Villariba a babaylan is a woman mystic who is "a specialist in the fields of culture, religion, medicine and all kinds of theoretical knowledge about the phenomenon of nature." In ancient Filipino society, the babaylans are believed to be a woman who had been possessed by a spirit, or a woman who had dreams or had encountered life-altering experiences, or a woman who has inherited the role to become a "mystical woman" from an elder babaylan. Their functions include the role of community leaders, warriors, community defenders, priestesses, healers, sages and seers. Babaylans could be women, but there were many instances of gender fluidity amongst those who held the title, similar to the ways third gender, and two-spirit, functions in the role of many other pre-colonial societies.

=== Albularyo ===
The albularyo (the "herbalist", herbolario in Spanish) is the "general practitioner" and the "primary dispenser of healthcare" in the hierarchy of traditional folk doctors in the Philippines. Because of the mass amount of different dialects spoken in the country, they have a diverse set of names depending on the region (suranho, sirkano, baylan, hapsalan, tambala, mananambal, etc.). He or she is knowledgeable in the use of medicinal herbs. The skill of the albularyo is commonly handed down from one generation to another in a family-line, involving apprenticeship. Abularyos are mostly the elders of the Barangays. The common folk diagnosis is that patients become sick due to supernatural "illness-causers" such as a duwende (dwarf), a nuno, a lamang-lupa (a "creature from the earth or underground or under the soil"), a tikbalang, or a kapre. He or she usually includes forms of prayers, such as bulong ("whispering" prayers) or orasyon (oration or "prayer recitation"), while treating patients. Albularyos may also practice rituals to drive away evil spirits, such as the performance of the kanyaw (cutting and bleeding chickens, then draining their blood on particular perimeters of the house), or the slaughter of pigs to search for the right type of liver that would reveal the cause of an illness. Sacrificial offerings are also sometimes used during treatments. Some albularyos choose to treat patients only on certain days of the week, such as Tuesdays and Fridays, or on the feast days of the Sto. Niño and the Black Nazarene, with the belief that healing powers are greater during those days. The methods and practices used by albularyos vary per region.

=== Mananambal ===
In Cebu, located in the Visayas region of the Philippines, a traditional albularyo is called a Mananambal and their work of healing is called panambal. Like the general albularyo, mananambals obtain their status through ancestry, apprenticeship/observational practice, or through an epiphany and are generally performed by the elders of the community, regardless of gender. Their practice, or panambal, has a combination of elements from Christianity and sorcery which appear to be opposites since one involves faith healing while the other requires Black magic, Witchcraft, etc. The combinations are a reflection of the legacies left from the conversion to Catholicism of the islands from Spanish colonization, since the Indigenous of Cebu had direct contact with the Portuguese explorer Ferdinand Magellan, and on-going Indigenous practices before colonization. The panambals cover natural and supernatural illnesses using a wide range of methods. Two common methods used are herbal medicine and orasyon, healing prayers deriving from a bible equivalency called the librito.

Mananambals treat major and minor ailments. These ailments include but are not limited to: headache, fever, cold, toothache, dengue fever, wounds, Infection, cancer, intellectual impairment, and other illnesses thought to be caused by supernatural creatures. Aside from biological treatments, patients may also come to mananambals to form or break any form of relationships from marriage to friendships. Treatments are dependent on the type of sickness and on the mananambal themselves.

=== Hilot ===
The hilot may refer to either the manghihilot or the magpapaanak: The manghihilot ("massager", "folk massage therapist", "folk chiropractor") uses massaging techniques to treat sprains, fractures, and other similar conditions that affect the skeletal system and the musculatory system, including ligaments. The practice treats illnesses a variety of ways based on its own universal law and natural Law (physical manipulation, herbal remedies, and dietary/life style advice). Manghihilots are either chosen by maestros or master albularyos, or through apprenticeship. Gender is not a limiting factor since they can be any gender. When chosen, their trainings include a pilgrimage to a sacred mountain to perform the oracions, or words enabling the communication with the spirit world or the panawagan. Similar to the albularyo practice, the hilot is a fusion of spiritual and medicinal practices with physical manipulation and the focus of healing the whole body being the main distinctions between the two practices. Illnesses were referred to as pilay and were defined by imbalances in the body which are explained by their enkanto, or unseen entities, elements, and manifestations in the body. This practice shares similarities with India's Ayurveda and Traditional Chinese Medicine. The magpapaanak, the other "hilot", is the folk "midwife" who does prenatal visits and check-ups to pregnant mothers. Normally a woman, she delivers babies during childbirth and often performs the ritual called the suob (a form of "aroma therapy" performed while placed under a cloak).

=== Mangluluop ===
The mangluluop is a folk specialist who makes a diagnosis based on the resulting appearance of a burned concoction composed of freshwater shell or saltwater shell (kalanghuga), salt, a piece of palm leaves that were blessed by Catholic priests during Palm Sunday, and charcoal resulting from coconut shells, coconut midribs. The burning of these materials is done while placed inside a tin plate accompanied by prayers and invocations and the making of the sign of the cross three times over the body of the patient. Depending on the appearance and shape of the burned materials, mangluluop refers and sends the ill person to either the albularyo, the mediko, or the manghihilot for further treatment. After the ritual and after telling the patient to which folk doctor to go next, the freshwater or saltwater shell is powdered by the mangluluop and prayerfully applies the powder following the steps of how to make sign of the cross on the patient's forehead, palms, and plantar arches of the feet. The remainder of the concoction is then thrown under the stairs at the entrance of the home to prevent evil spirits from re-invading the house.

=== Manghihila ===
The manghihila (the "puller") uses the technique known as panghihila (the "pulling"), wherein the patient is rubbed with coconut oil accompanied by the use of a mirror, strips of cellophane paper that were used as wrappers of cigarette boxes, strips of banana frond, or wrappings of medicinal leaves. The type of "pull" felt during the massage therapy becomes the basis of what causes the ailment (i.e. the "smoothness" of the pull of the material used or the lingering or hovering or the strength of resistance of the applied material on a specific spot of the patient's body).

=== Mangtatawas ===
The mangtatawas (literally "user of tawas") determines the cause and nature of illnesses through the use of potassium alum, locally known in the Philippines as tawas as one of the primary ingredients. The other materials used in the diagnostic procedure are candles, eggs, mirrors, plain paper, and paper used for rolling cigarettes.

=== Mediko ===
The mediko is a folk doctor and a specialist that combines folk medicine and some techniques used in western medicine. He or she prescribes medications and at times uses acupuncture to treat ailments.

=== Faith healer ===
Filipino faith healers come from either spiritist groups, diviners (a group that practice divination) or from persons who were previously saved from illnesses or death and had encountered epiphanies or mystical experiences who became convinced that they were destined to help sick people after receiving healing powers bestowed upon them by the Holy Spirit or other supernatural beings. Some of them started as an albularyo, a mediko, or a hilot. Some faith healers are psychic healers (faith healers who heal patients remotely), whisperers of prayers (whispers prayers over the affected part of the body of the patient), prayer blowers (blows prayers on affected areas of the patient's body), anointers that rub saliva over the affected area of the patient, healers who hovers crucifixes and icons on the body of the patient, and psychic surgeons (folk surgeons who performs "surgery" on a patient without the use of surgical tools).

=== Cordilleras shaman ===
The shamans from the Philippine Cordilleras are folk healers that heal ailments based on the beliefs of people collectively known as the Igorots (includes tribes of the Bontok, Gaddang, Ibaloy, Ifugao, Ilongot, Isneg, Kalinga, Kankana-ey, Ikalahan, I'wak and Tinguian). Their culture believe in rituals that involve offering of prayers and sacrifial animals, belief in supreme deities or supreme beings, lesser ranked deities, intermediation by seers or human mediums, and pleasing and appeasing the anito (spirits of the dead, ancestral spirits, or spirits from nature) to prevent them from inducing diseases and misfortunes. They also cling to animism, ceremonies that are believed to cure physical and mental imbalances, those that counter witchcraft, and those that leads to bountiful harvests. Sacrifices, feasts and dances were performed as a form of thanksgiving and as entertainment for gods and goddesses. Other tribal healers dispenses magical amulets to use against illnesses and the pouring animal blood on the human body to avoid and escape death.

== Medicinal plants ==
Years before the arrival of the Spaniards in the Philippines, the use of medicinal plants was the common way of treating ailments. Early Catholic missionaries such as Fr. Francisco Ignacio Alcina, SJ and Fray José de Valencia, and Fr. Pablo Clain, SJ were able to compile and publish books regarding these medicinal plants in the Philippines. Alcina and de Valencia published theirs in 1669, while Clain published his collection in 1712. The first qualities of plant medicines in the Philippines was first recorded by Fr. Blas de la Madre de Dios, OFM through his books Flora de Filipinas (Plants of the Philippines) and Tratado de Medicina Domestica (Treatise on Domestic Medicine).

== Early medicinal practices ==
Cleaning cadavers were done by bathing and then rubbing the corpses with camphor oil. After cleansing, preservation of dead bodies were done through the introduction of buyo, a type of beetle and aloes via the mouth. Persons bitten by rabid dogs were treated by curanderos using the brain of a rabid dog. For 300 years, the efficacy of oil from monungal wood scrapings and pieces were used to fight cholera.

Early Filipino used hydrotherapy by bathing in natural hot springs or sulphuric body of waters. Filipinos of Spanish times, particularly those in Los Baños, Laguna, still bathe themselves even if sick. The placename Los Baños is Spanish for "the places for bathing".

To cure appendicitis, traditional Filipino healers during the Spanish period in the Philippines prescribed the intake of "water-treated fresh chicken gizzards" that would last for three consecutive Friday mornings.

== Medicine in Spanish Colonized Philippines (1600s to 1800s) ==
During the 17th and 18th centuries, the number of medical supplies pouring into the Philippines was dependent on the yearly Manila-Acapulco Galleon Trade, wherein medical supplies come mainly from Mexico (New Spain). Supplies had been routed from Europe to Mexico and then to the Philippines. In addition to this, the number of certified physicians, pharmacists, and surgeons trained in Europe were concentrated at the Cuerpo Sanidad Militar located in Manila. Because of this localization of medical personnel in Manila, religious Franciscan and Dominican missionaries acted as infirmarians, hospital founders, and the surveyors of herbal medicines at the localities where they were assigned.

=== Common diseases ===
Common disease during the Spanish period in the Philippines were diarrhea, dysentery, and leprosy. There were also the presence of cholera, influenza, smallpox, beri-beri, dysentery, bubonic plague, scurvy, rheumatism, asthma, syphilis, tetanus, toothache, and ulcers. Many Filipinos believed in pasma (a resulting condition similar to spasm which involves the occurrence of hand tremors, sweaty palms, numbness and pains after the body's exposure to "unhealthy cold" and water), the state of nausog ("distress" caused by an unfamiliar person), and "personalistic sorcery".

=== Pharmacies ===
It was in 1830 when the "true pharmacies" were established in the Manila, Philippines. In 1871, a faculty of pharmacy was formally established at the University of Santo Tomas, and was later followed by the opening of "well-appointed drug stores".

The decree of 1875 resulted in the establishment of public pharmacies, known as Botiquin Auxiliar to areas where there were shortages in medicine. Municipal physicians were assigned to these pharmacies. These were established on outskirts of Manila like Tondo and Santa Ana.

=== Hospitals ===
Both the Spanish government and Spanish missionaries established a number of hospitals in the Philippines. The first hospital was erected by the Spaniards in Cebu during 1565. That first hospital was later transferred to Manila for the purpose of treating sick and wounded military personnel. The establishment of other health and charity institutions soon followed. The missionaries who established the early hospitals in the Philippines were the Franciscans, the Brotherhood of the Misericordia, the Brotherhood of San Juan de Dios, and the Dominicans. There were also lay government people who became founders of hospitals during the time period. Among the early hospitals in the Philippines were the following:

==== Manila ====
Manila had the Hospital Real de Españoles (Royal Spanish Hospital, existed from 1577 to 1898), the Hospital de los Indios Naturales (Hospital of Native Indians, existed from 1578 to 1603), Hospital de Santa Ana (St. Anne Hospital, founded in 1603, still exists today), Hospital de la Misericordia (Mercy Hospital, existed from 1578 to 1656), the Hospital of San Juan de Dios (St. John of God Hospital, established in 1656, and still existing to the present), Hospital de San Lazaro (Hospital of St. Lazarus, a hospital for lepers established in 1603, still exists today), Hospital de San Pedro Martir (St. Peter the Martyr Hospital, 1587 to 1599), and the Hospital de San Gabriel (St. Gabriel Hospital, a hospital that is specialty for the Chinese community of Binondo, 1599 to 1774).

==== Cavite ====
In Cavite, the Hospital del Espiritu Santo (Holy Spirit Hospital) existed from 1591 to 1662. This hospital took care of sailors, marine personnel, shipbuilders, and carpenters among others.

==== Laguna ====
In Laguna, the Hospital de Nuestra Señora de las Aguas Santas de Mainit (Our Lady of the Holy Waters Hospital in Mainit, Mainit being the name of a place with hot springs in Laguna) existed from 1597 to 1727 and then was re-established from 1877 and still existing up to the present. The hospital was built by Franciscan missionaries on top of the location of hot springs in Los Baños, Laguna due to the therapeutic effects of the natural springs to the body of sick people, as they had observed from Filipinos of the time who bathe in hot springs despite being ill.

==== Naga ====
In Naga, the Hospital de Santiago (St. James's Hospital) existed from 1611 to 1691. Another hospital also named as the Hospital de San Lazaro (Hospital of St. Lazarus), which is different from the one catering to leper patients in Manila, existed from 1873 and is still functioning today.

=== Vaccination ===
During the first part of the nineteenth century, public health policies in Manila led to the launch of smallpox vaccination throughout the archipelago. The Central Board of Vaccination, also called the Junta Central de Vacuna, was established in 1806, as a result of the Royal Orders of 1803 and 1808. The vaccination in the provinces was handled by the Vacunador General, which would collect baptism records from parishes and manage vaccination.

After 1883, caraballa calves as well horse, goat, deer, and monkey were used for producing vaccine. By the end of the Spanish regime in 1898, there were 122 vaccinators in different Philippine provinces in addition to so-called vacunadorcillas (vaccinators, or vaccine givers) assigned to each town.

=== Asian medicines ===
Drugs and medicines from China and from some regions of Southeast Asia were part of the medical trade during the Spanish period in the Philippines. A 1637 report of Don Juan Grau y Monfalcon attested the procurement of "valuable drugs" from a Cambodian king in 1600. A 1590 report of Bishop Domingo de Salazar, OP, confirmed the existence of shops with doctors and apothecaries managed by the Chinese in the Parián of Spanish Manila.

=== Obstetrics ===
In Spanish Philippines, childbirth were managed by the traditional matrona (a type of comadrona or midwife), by the mediquillos, and by some parish priests. Childbearing manuals written during the period include Fr. Julian Bermejo's Instrucciones para las Parteras, a fin de evitar los abortos y que los niños que mueran sin el bautismo (Instructions for Midwives to Prevent Abortion and Death of Unbaptised Babies) and Fr. Gregorio Sanz's Embologia Sagrada (Sacred Embryology). Bermejo's Instrucciones was the "earliest attempt" to manage fatal childbirthing complications.

=== Surgery ===
The benefit of general surgical procedures was not available to common Filipinos during the Spanish era. Although Spanish surgeons were skillful in performing amputations and mutilations in the 1800s, their services were only available to by Spanish officials stationed in Manila. One such surgery was performed by Don Juan Ventura Sarra in 1675 on his patient Don Manuel de Leon to cure the latter's obesity and corpulence. The surgery involved removal of "lumps of lipids" from de Leon's abdominal cavities. Another recorded surgical treatment performed by Ventura Sarra was on a governor named Don Juan Vargas Hurtado in 1682, an operation that removed an abscess from Vargas Hurtado's hip.

=== Medical literature ===
During the Spanish period in the Philippines, Fr. Miguel Aganduru, a Recollect priest, published the Manual de Medicinas Caseras para Consuelo de los Pobres Indios (Medical Manual to Aid the Poor Indians). Aganduru wrote the medical manual to help ordinary Filipinos, with the assumption that such commoners could read the text of the book that was written in Spanish. Another type of such book that was intended to help ordinary Filipinos was of the Jesuit Fr. Paul Klein's 1708 Remedios faciles para diferentes infermedades por el P. Pablo Clain de la Compania de Jesus para el alivio, y Socorro de las PP. Ministros Evangelicos de las Doctrinas de los Naturales (Easy Remedies for Different Illnesses by Fr. Paul Klein, S.J. to Assist Ministers Evangelising the Natives).

Other works include Dominican Fr. Fernando de Santa Maria's Manuel de Medicinas Caseras para Consuelo de las Pobres Indios en las Provincias y Pueblos donde no hay Medicina, ni Botica (Domestic Medicines to Aid the Poor Indians in the Provinces and Towns with neither Physicians nor Pharmacies, a work that he started from 1730 and was completed in 1786), Dominican Fr. Juan de Vergara's Tratado sobre medicinas caseras, Fr. Ignacio Mercado's Libro de Medicinas (Book of Medicines), Fr. Juan Biso's Tratado de Arboles y Hierbas de Indias (Treatise on Forests and Herbs of the Indians), Fr. Antonio Llanos' La Medicina Domestica (Domestic Medicine), Fr. Rodrigo de San Miguel's Manual de Medicina Domestica (Manual on Domestic Medicine), and Fr. Manuel Vilches' Manuel del Mediquillo Visaya (Manuel of the Visayan Traditional Healers).

== Medicine in American Colonized Philippines (1900s–1940s) ==
By the early 1900s, the number of physicians increased in the Philippines. During the time that American troops entered Manila in 1898, they observed the unsanitary condition of the place. During the American occupation, sanitation problems and epidemics became concerns among American authorities. Victor Heiser, Director of the Bureau of Health from 1905 to 1913, noted the incompetency of medical personnel and lack of proper hospitals. Dean Conant Worcester, Secretary of the Department of the Interior in the Philippine Islands, also shared the same sentiments as Heiser. He comments that what the Philippines needed was a good sanition system, honest government, and education.

=== Medical education ===
One of the legacies of Americans in the Philippines was their priority on education especially on their educational campaigns on various diseases. In June 1908, the first Philippine Legislature passed the Act 1870 which established the University of the Philippines. In December 1910, the Philippine Medical School was incorporated to the university, which would be later known as University of the Philippines College of Medicine and Surgery (UPCMS). With the establishment of formal medical education for Filipinos, Heiser stated: "We do not need American, European, or other foreign physicians, but educated sanitarians."

=== Medical research ===
Many Filipino medical practitioners have made significant contributions during this period. In bacteriology, Onofre Garcia in the 1930s made researches on the serology of yaws and syphilis. Manuel S. Guerrero and Dr. Jose E. Montes reported and researched cases on Sodoku.

Eliodoro Mercado introduced a treatment for leprosy by injecting heterocyclic fatty acids of chaulmoogra oil. Proceso Gabriel was credited for the beriberi treatment of tikitiki. In 1911, Felix Hocson, with H. Aron, conducted studies on nitrogen and phosphorus metabolism on diets consisting of rice.

In parasitology, Candido Africa, with Eusebio Y. Garcia and Walfrido de Leon, discovered obscure flukes found in the human heart.

== Japanese occupation ==
By January 1942, shortages of food and medicine became evident as the Japanese forces began their invasion since December 1941. Diseases like malaria, beriberi, and dysentery became common. Rampant malnutrition and sanitation crisis persists. Access to public health and hospitals were very limited. Most of the health services in Manila were provided by the city's Health Service Branch under Dr. Mariano Icasiano.

=== Santo Tomas Internment Camp ===
On December 23, 1941, the Japanese Imperial Government issued the "Prisoner Confinement Order". The Japanese army forces captured 140,000 Allied prisoners of war in Hawaii, the Philippines, and Burma in 1942. It was estimated that the Santo Tomas Internment Camp in the Philippines have more than 4,000 Allied citizens captured. They were given no basic shelter and food. The camp was equipped with Japanese military medical officers and captive Western doctors.

As World War II continued, the Japanese military stopped giving captives medicine and cures for handling diseases. The camp was unsanitary making diseases like dengue fever and dysentery unpreventable. By May 1944, the Japanese military forced prisoners to reduce their rations. As part of the military's way of disciplining them, they also forced prisoners to worship Emperor Hirohito. Doctors were not allowed to record malnourishment cases. Dr. William W. McAnlis was one of the medical missionaries in the Philippines who got captured and interned in the Santo Tomas Camp. As one of the captive doctors, he handled emergency cases and needed medical services.

As conditions in the camp worsened, doctors requested for food and medicine increases. The Japanese military refused.

=== Human experiments ===
In 1942, a Japanese surgeon in the Philippines forced soldiers to abduct a healthy Filipino man and brought him to a field where students were observing. The surgeon anesthetized the man, performed unnecessary surgery (removing his appendix), and then, after the demonstration was over, fatally shot the victim.

Akira Makino, who used to be a medic for the 33rd coast guard squad, stated that, when he landed at Mindanao in Zamboanga in 1944, some Japanese surgical doctors would amputate and made vivisections on captived Moros. They would show it to young medics to demonstrate surgical operations. According to the Japanese veteran, he later became accustomed to it and stated to the Taipei Times: "We were told the Moros were such cruel people that they attacked enemies with spears and we actually rescued some people assaulted by them". He further stated that he remembered 50 hostages were killed.

== In art ==
Philippine National Artist and painter Carlos "Botong" V. Francisco recorded and depicted the history of medicine in the Philippines by creating four mural-like four-panel oil paintings collectively titled The Progress of Medicine in the Philippines, which traced the practice of medicine from the times of the babaylans ("medicine men and women") up to a period in the modern-day era. The first painting depicts pre-colonial medicine, the second portrays medicine during the Spanish colonial period, the third describes medicine during the American occupation era, and the fourth the modern era of the 1950s. Each of the "panel paintings" measured 2.92 meters by 2.76 meters. The paintings were commissioned in 1953 to Francisco by four medical doctors, namely Dr. Agerico Sison, Dr. Eduardo Quisumbing, Dr. Florentino Herrera, Jr., and Dr. Constantino Manahan. Restorations of the historical paintings were done in 1974, 1991 and from 2006 to 2007. They were displayed at the lobby of the Philippine General Hospital for 58 years until their permanent relocation to the Museum Foundation of the Philippines Hall at the National Museum of the Philippines on July 27, 2011, because the paintings are now valued and was officially declared on September 21, 2011, as national treasures of the Philippines. The Philippine General Hospital now have on display only the reproductions of the original paintings, which were photographed by Benigno Toda III, a Filipino art expert.

== See also ==
- Health in the Philippines
- Medical education in the Philippines
- Nursing in the Philippines
- History of dentistry in the Philippines
- History of veterinary medicine in the Philippines

== Bibliography ==
- Bantug, José Policarpio, PhD, MD, MSc, Associate Professor, Faculty of Medicine, University of Santo Tomas. A Short History of Medicine in the Philippines during the Spanish Regime 1565-1898.
- Dayrit, Conrado S., Perla Dizon Santos-Ocampa and Eduardo R. de la Cruz. History of Philippine Medicine, Anvil Publishing, Inc. (2002), 440 pages, ISBN 978-971-27-1221-0
- Flavier, Juan M. Doctor to the Barrios, New Day Publisher (1970), 208 pages
