= Animal technology =

Professional field

Animal technology refers to the practices of keeping, breeding and providing care for animals that are used for scientific purposes, such as captive in a laboratory. Animal technology is one of the recognized professional areas held by registered science technicians, and animal technologists, also called animal technicians, play a key role in supporting biomedical research by ensuring that animals are available for study. Principal areas of animal technology include animal husbandry and breeding, providing day-to-day care for laboratory animals, ensuring compliance with animal welfare practices and legal issues and performing essential scientific procedures. Technical qualifications for animal technologists and the regulations they must adhere to vary by country, but in many parts of the world animal technology is a highly structured profession that forms part of laboratory management. Animal technology is related to the field of animal management and technologists are often specialize in working with particular species of animals, either in the laboratory or in the field.

== See also ==
- Technology in veterinary medicine
- History of wildlife tracking technology
