= Veterinary medicine in the United States =

Medical treatment of animals in the United States

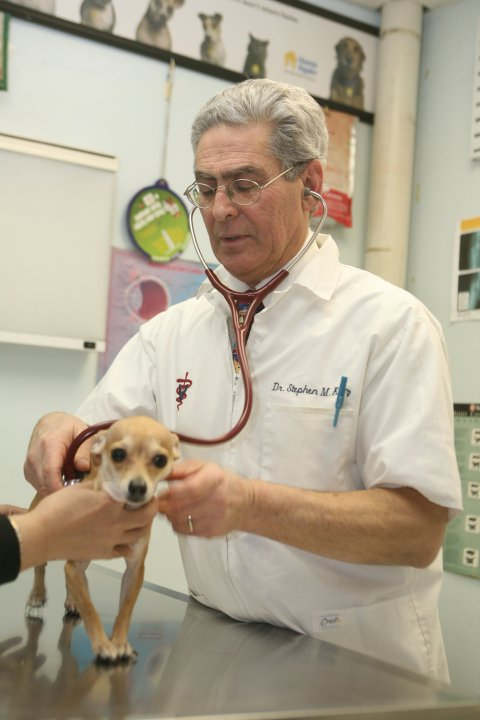
A vet examines a dog in New York.

Veterinary medicine in the United States is the performance of veterinary medicine in the United States, normally performed by licensed medical professionals, and subject to provisions of statute law which vary by state. Veterinary medicine is normally led by veterinary physicians, termed veterinarians or vets, but also by paraveterinary workers, such as veterinary technicians, and veterinary assistants. This can be augmented by other paraprofessionals with specific specialties, such as animal physiotherapy or dentistry, and species-relevant roles such as farriers.

Dependent on the jurisdiction, other professionals may be permitted to perform some animal treatment, through either specific exemptions in the law or through a lack of prohibitive legislation. This can include manipulation techniques such as physiotherapy, chiropractic and osteopathy, or animal-specific professions such as horse and cattle hoof trimmers, equine dentists, and technicians who specialize in cattle artificial insemination.

== Veterinarians ==
=== Veterinarian's Oath ===
The Veterinarian's Oath was adopted by the American Veterinary Medical Association's House of Delegates July 1969, and amended by the AVMA Executive Board, November 1999 and December 2010.

Being admitted to the profession of veterinary medicine, I solemnly swear to use my scientific knowledge and skills for the benefit of society through the protection of animal health and welfare, the prevention and relief of animal suffering, the conservation of animal resources, the promotion of public health, and the advancement of medical knowledge.

I will practice my profession conscientiously, with dignity, and in keeping with the principles of veterinary medical ethics. I accept as a lifelong obligation the continual improvement of my professional knowledge and competence.

=== Qualification ===
In order to practice, veterinarians must obtain a degree in veterinary medicine, followed by gaining a license to practice. Previously, veterinary degrees were available as a bachelor's degree, but now all courses result in the award of a doctorate and are therefore awarded a Doctor of Veterinary Medicine (DVM) at most veterinary schools in the United States, or a Veterinariae Medicinae Doctoris ("Veterinary Medical Doctor") (VMD) if the degree is earned at the University of Pennsylvania School of Veterinary Medicine.

There is a high level of competition for admission to veterinary schools. As of 2021, there were only 33 veterinary schools in the United States and five in Canada which met the accreditation standards set by the AVMA Council on Education. Entrance requirements vary among veterinary schools, and various pre-professional degree programs have been developed to assist undergraduates in meeting these requirements. Such "pre-vet" programs are thus similar in concept to "pre-med" programs.

Following qualification from the doctoral degree, the prospective veterinarian must receive a passing grade on the North America Veterinary Licensing Exam. This exam is completed over the course of eight hours, and consists of 360 multiple-choice questions. This exam covers all aspects of veterinary medicine, as well as visual material designed to test diagnostic skills.

=== Salary ===
The median salary for starting veterinarians in 2018 was $104,690 in the United States according to U.S. Money News, while the lowest paid graduates earned approximately $87,000 annually. Montana had the lowest state average, while Michigan, Illinois and Hawaii had the highest.

The average income for private practice associates in the United States was $191,000 in 2017. According to DVM360 most practice owners paid themselves based on production, including a 3–4% management fee plus a 4.5% "return on investment" fee dependent on the value of their business. The average owner of a veterinary practice earned approximately $382,000 per year base salary in 2017. These increased values exceed those of public practice including uniformed services and government. In comparison, the profession-wide average income in Australia was $167,000 in 2015.

=== Veterinary specialties ===
As opposed to human medicine, general practice veterinarians greatly outnumber veterinary specialists. Most veterinary specialists work at the veterinary schools, or at a referral center in large cities. As opposed to human medicine, where each organ system has its own medical and surgical specialties, veterinarians often combine both the surgical and medical aspect of an organ system into one field. The specialties in veterinary medicine often encompass several medical and surgical specialties that are found in human medicine.

Veterinary specialties are accredited in North America by the AVMA through the American Board of Veterinary Specialties. While some veterinarians may have areas of interest outside of recognized specialties, they are not legally specialists.

According to a veterinary survey top paying specialties include veterinary anesthesiology ($389,105 median salary in 2008), veterinary ophthalmology ($215,120 median salary in 2009), veterinary nutrition ($202,368 average salary in 2008), and veterinary general surgery ($183,902 average salary in 2008).

== Veterinary technicians ==
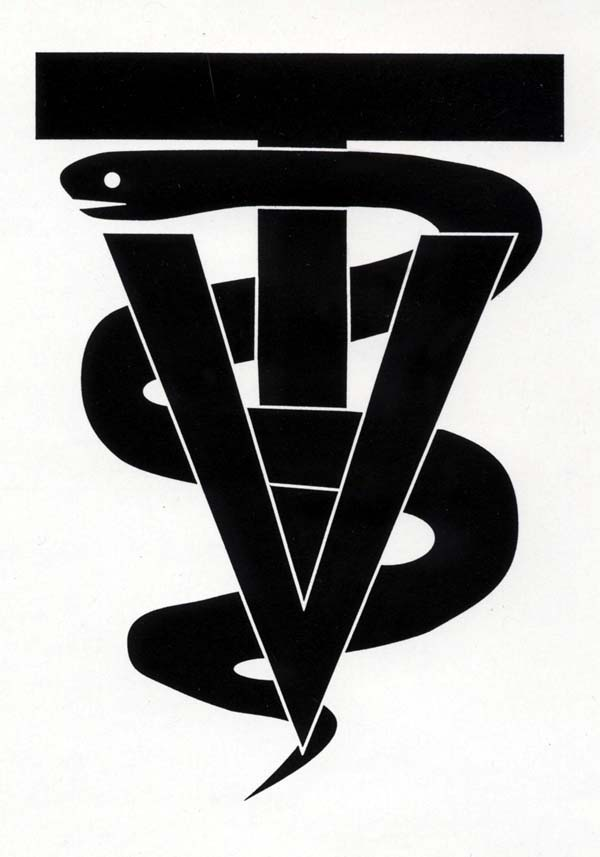
Veterinary technician logo

Veterinary technicians are the primary paraveterinary workers in the US in the role of a nurse (and in most other anglophone countries, the equivalent role is called a veterinary nurse), providing trained support. The requirements for technicians vary by state, but in most cases, technicians are graduates of two or four year college-level programs and are legally qualified to assist in many medical procedures.

Some states choose to license technicians, so that only people with appropriate qualifications are able to fulfill the role, but this is not the case in all jurisdictions.

=== History ===
Veterinary technology as an organized and credentialed career option is relatively young, only existing since the mid 20th century, although it began in 1908 when the Canine Nurses Institute was established in England, and as such is still struggling for recognition in many parts of the world. The first training program for technicians in the United States was established by the Air Force in 1951. The first civilian program was established ten years later in 1961 at the State University of New York (SUNY) Agricultural and Technical College at Delhi. In 1965 Walter Collins, a veterinarian, received federal funding to develop model curricula for training technicians. He produced several guides over the next seven years, and for this work he is considered the "father of veterinary technology" in the United States.

=== Role and duties ===
Technical skills include: venipuncture; collecting urine; performing skin scrapings; taking and processing radiographs; and performing routine lab procedures and tests in: hematology, blood chemistry, microbiology, urinalysis, and microscopy. They assist the veterinarian with physical examinations that help determine the nature of the illness or injury. Veterinary technicians also induce and maintain anesthesia, and administer medications, fluids and blood products as prescribed by the veterinarian. Tasks in patient care include: recording temperature, pulse and respiration, dressing wounds, applying splints and other protective devices, and dental procedures. They perform catheterizations – urinary, arterial, and venous; ear flushes; intravenous feedings and tube feedings. Equipment use includes operating various types of patient monitors and imaging devices to include electrocardiographic, radiographic and ultrasonographic equipment. Larger referral practices and teaching hospitals may also find veterinary technicians operating computed tomography equipment, magnetic resonance imagers, gamma cameras and other advanced medical devices. Veterinary technicians commonly assist in surgery by providing correct equipment and instruments and by assuring that monitoring and support equipment are in good working condition. They may also maintain treatment records and inventory of all pharmaceuticals, equipment and supplies, and help with other administrative tasks within a veterinary practice such as client education. Unlike their more specialized counterparts among medical paraprofessionals, the veterinary technician is usually the only paraprofessional found in a veterinary practice and is thus often called upon to be a jack-of-all-trades. However, veterinary technicians with more advanced knowledge and skill in a particular discipline can pursue specialization through the NAVTA Committee on Veterinary Technician Specialties.

=== Education and credentialing ===
To become a credentialed veterinary technician, one must complete a two- or three-year AVMA credentialed degree, most of which result in the awarding of an Associate of Applied Science in Veterinary Technology degree. Those completing a four-year AVMA accredited school gain a bachelor's degree and are considered veterinary technologists, though the distinction is rarely made, with the term "technician" being used generally.

The education a credentialed technician receives is in-depth and crucial for medical understanding and to give proper health care. The American Veterinary Medical Association (AVMA) is responsible for accrediting schools with either associate's degrees or bachelor's degrees, though in some states or provinces this is not necessary. The AVMA also accredits schools that offer distance education. As a requirement of AVMA accreditation, all distance learning programs require a significant amount of practical clinical experience before the student will be allowed to graduate.

=== Specialty certification ===
Beyond credentialing as a veterinary technician specialty certification is also available to technicians with advanced skills. To date there are specialty recognitions in: emergency & critical care, anesthesiology, dentistry, small animal internal medicine, large animal internal medicine, cardiology, oncology, neurology, zoological medicine, equine veterinary nursing, surgery, behavior, nutrition, clinical practice (canine/feline, exotic companion animal, and production animal sub-specialties), and clinical pathology. Veterinary Technician Specialists carry the additional post-nominal letters "VTS" with their particular specialties indicated in parentheses. As veterinary technology evolves, more specialty academy recognitions are anticipated.

== Veterinary assistants ==
Non-credentialed personnel who perform similar tasks to veterinary technicians are usually referred to as veterinary assistants, though the term technician is often applied generously. In many states, a veterinary assistant cannot legally perform as many procedures as a technician. Veterinary assistants often have no formal education related to veterinary medicine or veterinary technology; however, NAVTA recently approved the designation of Approved Veterinary Assistant (AVA) for those successfully completing approved educational programs. In larger facilities with tiered hierarchies, veterinary assistants typically assist other professionals in their duties.

== Veterinary malpractice ==
Most states in the US allow for malpractice lawsuit in case of death or injury to an animal from professional negligence. Usually the penalty is not greater than the value of the animal. For that reason, malpractice insurance for veterinarians usually is well under $500 a year, compared to an average of over $18,400 (in 2000) for a human doctor. Some states allow for punitive penalty, loss of companionship, and suffering into the award, likely increasing the cost of veterinary malpractice insurance and the cost of veterinary care. Most veterinarians carry much higher cost business insurance, worker's compensation, and facility insurance to protect their clients and workers from injuries inflicted by animals.

== See also ==
- History of veterinary medicine in the Philippines
- Veterinary medicine in the United Kingdom
