= Manuel S. Guerrero =

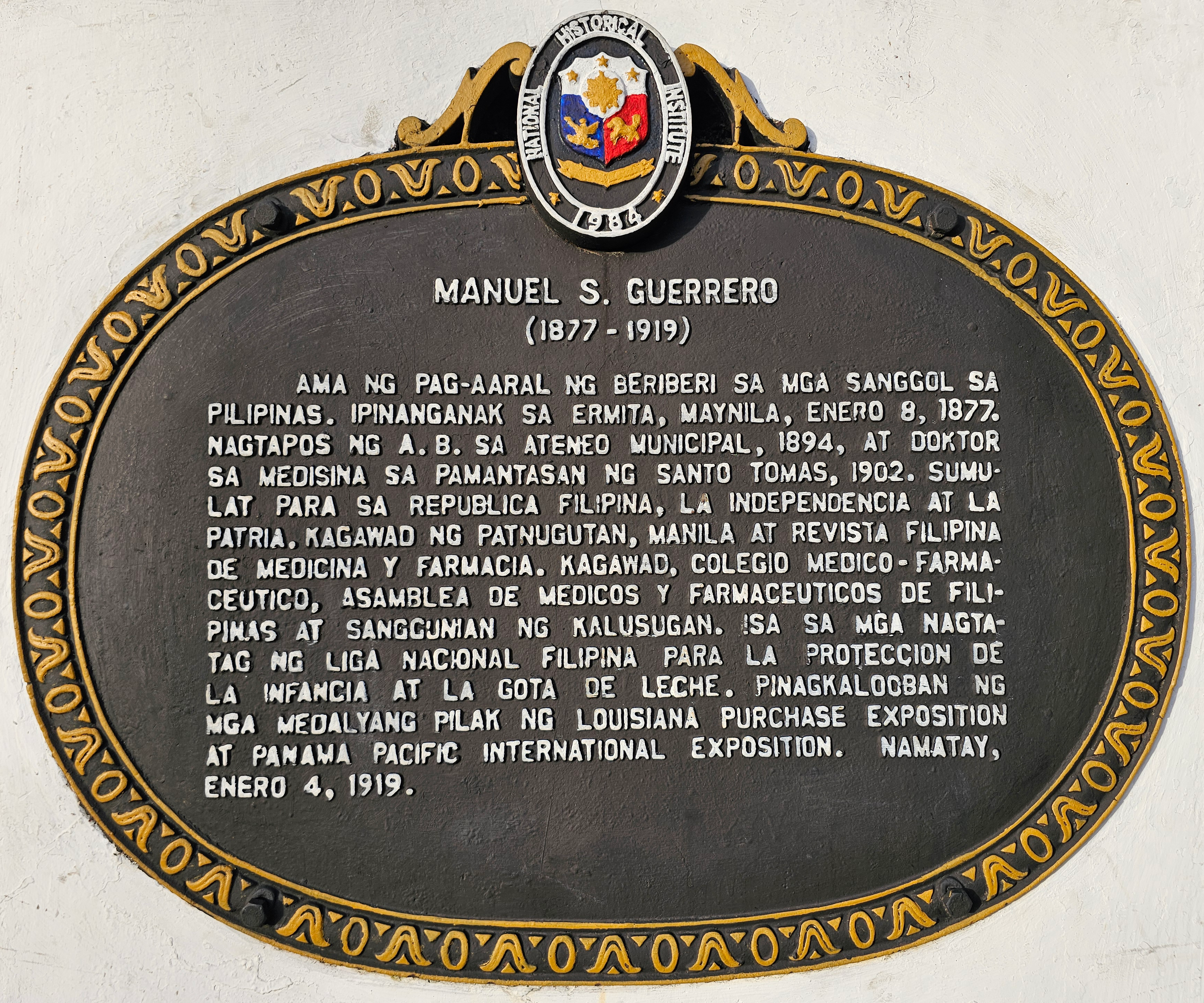
Historical marker installed in Ermita, Manila to commemorate Dr. Guerrero.

Manuel S. Guerrero (8 January 1877 – 4 January 1919) was a Filipino medical doctor who studied beriberi in infants in the Philippines.

Guerrero was born in Ermita, Manila then became part of the Captaincy General of the Philippines on 8 January 1877. He achieved a Bachelor of Arts degree at the Ateneo Municipal in the year 1894 and a Doctorate on Medicine at the University of Santo Tomas in 1902.

He was also a writer for the publications "La Republica Filipina, La Independencia, and La Patria". in addition he was a staff member of the Revista Filipina de Medicina y Farmacia. Guerrero was also a member of the Colegio Medico-Farmaceutico, Asamblea de Medicos y Farmaceuticos de Filipinas, and the Sanggunian ng Kalusagan. He was also one of the founders of t La Infancia and Gota de Leche.

Guerrero was also conferred with a silver medal at the Louisiana Purchase Exposition and the Panama Pacific Exhibition.
