= Dentistry in the Philippines =

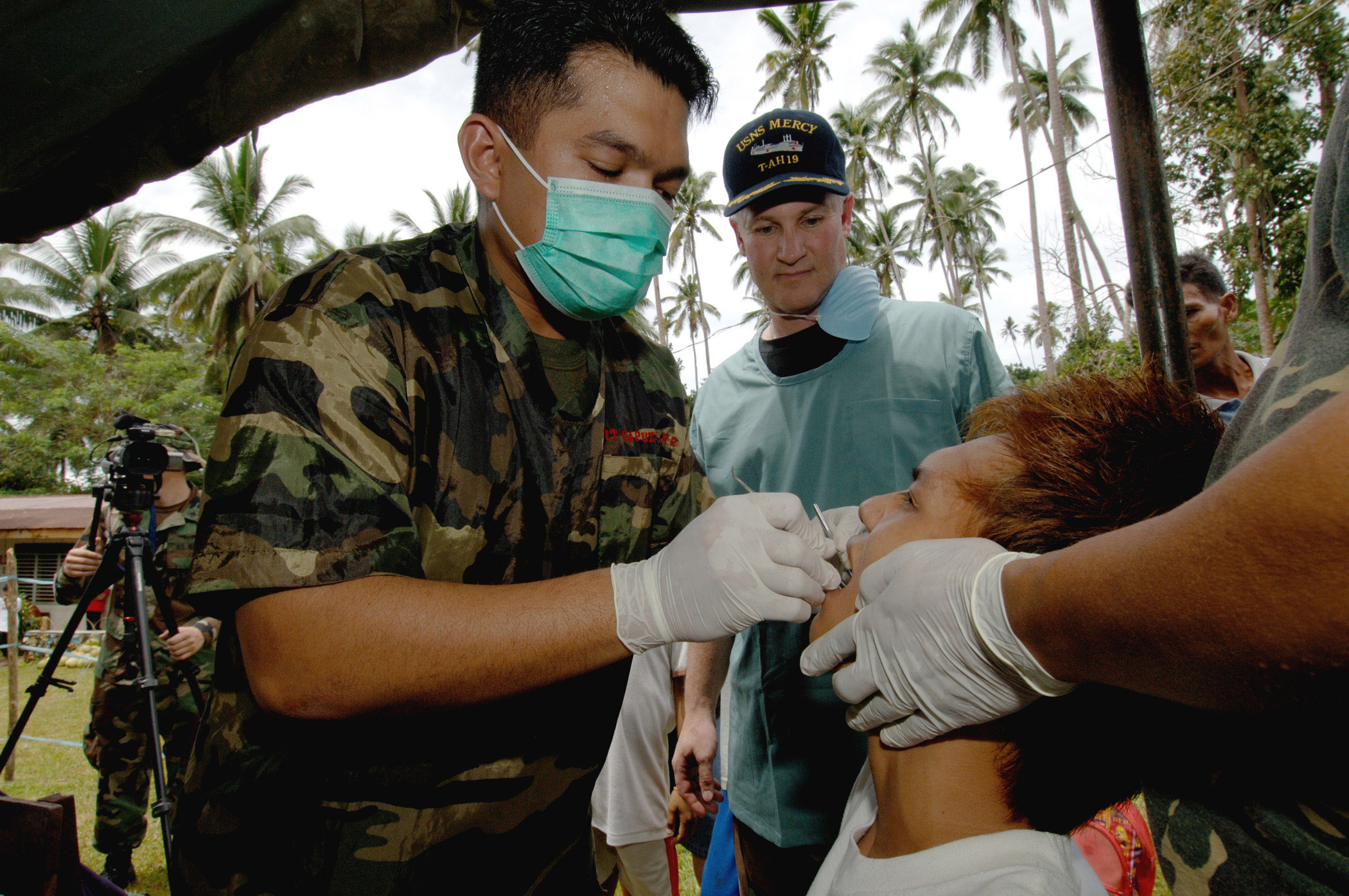
In Isabela, Basilan, at the Zamboanga Peninsula, Philippines, on May 29, 2006: A tooth extraction technique being employed by Filipino military male dentist to a patient was being observed by US Col. and USNS Mercy Dental Officer Jeffery Swartz of Smithtown, New Jersey, US.

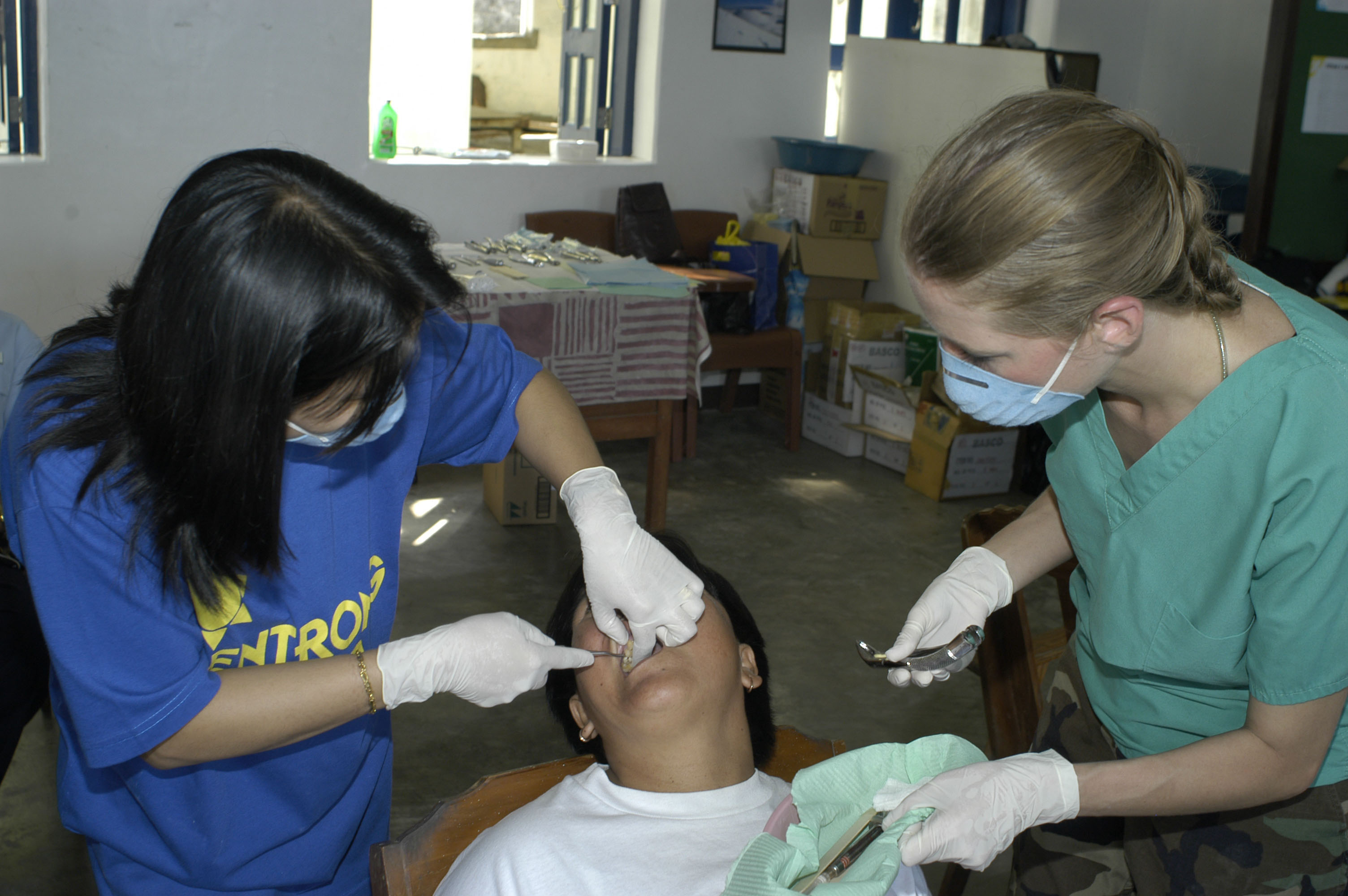
Filipino woman dentist Irma Villeta (left) and US Naval Reserve Dental Technician 1st Class Aimee Arnold (right) providing dental treatment to a patient during the medical assistance phase of Exercise Balikatan 2004 in Ivana, Batanes, Philippines, on March 3, 2004.

Dentistry in the Philippines is regulated by the Professional Regulation Commission of the Government of the Philippines. The practice of the profession is protected by Republic Act No. 9484 or "The Philippine Dental Act of 2007" was approved on June 2, 2007.

Dental practice in Philippine history can be divided into five periods which are: the Pre-Spanish era (from the Prehistoric period to the Classical period), the Spanish era, the American era, the Japanese occupation era (during World War II) and the independent Philippine-Republics era.

On 2024, the Department of Tourism provided guidelines to promote dental tourism in the country, which is a form of medical tourism.

== Pre-Spanish era (before 900 to 1521) ==
=== Barber-dentists ===
The practice of extracting teeth has been practiced in the Philippines before the islands became a colony of Spain. Among the early Filipino to act as "dental practitioners" and "curers of toothaches" were barbers. Their crude and "queer methods" of pulling out teeth from patients involved the use of fingers and nail pliers.

== Spanish era (1521 to 1898) ==
=== Tooth-pullers ===
During the Spanish regime in the Philippines, dentistry was not recognized as a profession. There were no royal decrees and laws from the Spanish government to govern and guide the practice of dentists. A professional regulating body was also non-existent to oversee the field of dental practice during that time period. At the time, dentists were known as sacamuelas (plural of sacamuela meaning "tooth-puller"). Any person of the time period who were skillful in pulling teeth could become a sacamuela.

=== First true dentists ===
The first dentist in Spanish Philippines to open a dental clinic to practice true dentistry was José "Capitan Cheng-cheng" Arevalo. Arevalo was the first Filipino dentist. Arevalo was assisted by his wife who was skilled in "gold craftsmanship". Arevalo's clinic was in Quiapo, Manila. Arevalo later became a partner of Monsiuer M. Fertri, a dentist from France, who opened another dental clinic in Quiapo, Manila, in 1858, after residing in Hong Kong. Fertri needed Arevalo's expertise as a prosthetist.

The development of dentistry as a profession started when the University of Santo Tomas offered a special course with a basic curriculum to train cirujano ministrantes (plural of cirujano ministrante, literally meaning "one who administers surgery"). Their name was later changed to cirujano dentistas (plural of cirujano dentista meaning "dentist-surgeon" or "dental surgeon").

== American era (1898 to 1946) ==
=== American-era Board of Dental Examiners ===
During the American administration of the Philippines, examinations and licensing of dentists were introduced in the islands. Major General Elwell Otis, the Military Governor of the Philippines at the time, instructed the US Provost Marshal General to assess the skills of the dentists who already practicing their craft in the islands. On August 2, 1899, the US Provost Marshal General established the Board of Dental Examiners. Examinations were held and licenses to practice were issued.

In 1903, Act No. 593 known as "The Act of Regulating the Practice of Dentistry in the Philippine Islands" was passed to regulate the practice of dentistry in the Philippines. Through this Act, the Board of Dental Examiners was reorganized on January 10, 1903. The members of the Board of Dental Examiners were appointed by the Commissioner of Public Health after obtaining approval from the Board of Health of the Philippine Islands. The members were two Americans (Dr. Robert Oliver and Dr. Wallace G. Skidmore) and one Filipino (Dr. Antonio Vergel de Dios), with Oliver as the chairman while Skidmore as the secretary treasurer.

=== Schools of dentistry ===
Some Filipinos who practiced dentistry in the Philippines at the time were graduates of schools of dentistry in the United States. Among them were Dr. Gregorio R. Mateo, Dr. Francisco Ponce, Dr. Placido Flores and Dr. Joaquin A. Lada.

The Sociedad dental de Filipinas, an organization of dentists in the Philippines founded in February 1908, initiated the establishment of dental schools in the Philippines and vied for the improvement of the profession in the islands. It was located in the corner of Escolta and Soda Streets. The first school of dentistry in the Philippines -The year 1913 marked the beginning of the De Ocampo Memorial College. It was then named Philippine Dental College- the first Dental College recognized by the Philippine government and authorized to confer the degree of Doctor of Dental Surgery (DDS) on March 25, 1916, and Doctor of Dental Medicine (DDM) on December 19, 1932. the Colegio Dental del Liceo de Manila - was founded in 1913 offering and granting degrees of Doctor of Dental Surgery (DDS) and Doctor of Dental Medicine (DDM). The Colegio Dental del Liceo de Manila was later renamed in 1914 as the Philippine Dental College. Afterwards, other universities and colleges also opened their own schools of dentistry. Among them were the University of the Philippines in 1915, the National University in 1922, the Centro Escolar University in 1925, and the Manila College of Dentistry in 1929. The teachers in these schools were US Army dental officers. Among them were Col. George G. Graham who taught periodontology, Major Harry Smalley who taught a course in prosthesis, and Major Thomas Page who taught operative dentistry.

=== Regulatory amendments ===
On February 5, 1915, the regulations concerning the holding of dental examinations and dental practice were amended by the Philippine Legislature through Act No. 2462. After the enactment of Act No. 2462, the appointment of the members of the Board of Dental Examiners were relegated to the Director of Health and is to be approved by the Secretary of the Interior. Act No. 2462 was further amended through Act No. 2602. The amendments in Act No. 2602 were related to the qualification, appointment, and removal of the members of the Board of Dental Examiners and the qualifications of candidates for dental board licensure examinations. Further changes were made through Act No. 3680 and 3681, in relation to reciprocity and removal of age requirement respectively for taking the dental licensure tests.

In 1932, the Board of Dental Examiners was placed under the administration of the Department of Public Instruction upon the enactment of Public Act No. 4007 (the Reorganization Law of 1932).

== Japanese-occupation era (1942 to 1945) ==
During World War II, the Philippines was occupied by the soldiers of the Japanese Empire from 1942 to 1945. Only a few number of dentists in the Philippines practiced their profession during the war and the occupation, often using resourcefulness due to insufficient availability of dental supplies. Ten years before the war, there was a steady supply of dental materials and equipment from the United States. Curricula for schools, including those that are for dental schools, were modified by the Japanese occupiers according to their military propaganda. After the war, dentists in the Philippines who survived the occupation returned to practicing their profession.

== Independent Philippine-Republics era (1946 to present) ==
=== Independent Philippine-Republics era Board of Dental Examiners ===
In 1948, the Board of Dental Examiners became an independent regulatory body due to Philippine Republic Act No. 546. The first members of that independent board appointed by the Secretary of Health was composed of Dr. Gervasio Erana, Dr. Germanico Carreon, and Diosdado Carpio, with Erana as the chairman of the board. The board was later given the "authority to issue, suspend or revoke certificates of registration and the power to administer oaths and oversee dental education requirements" after the enactment of The Philippine Dental Act of 1965 (Republic Act No. 4419).

=== New dental schools ===
Four new schools of dentistry were established in 1948. In Luzon, the Philippine College of Dental Medicine was founded, later to be renamed as the College of Dentistry of the University of the East. In the same year, three dental schools were established in the Visayas region. Among them were the Iloilo City Colleges and at the University of San Agustin.

=== Population of dentists ===
At one point in time, the World Health Organization (WHO) reported that there were about 43,220 dentists in the Philippines, meaning that there was one dentist responsible for the oral health of 22,300 students.

== Other notable Filipino dentists ==
There were Filipino dentists who excelled in the field of dentistry during the Philippine-Republics era: among them were Dr. Victorino G. Villa and Dr. Luz C. Macapanpan. Villa became the Dean of the College of Dentistry of the University of the Philippines. Villa wrote an article about detino-enamel and other research papers that were published in the United States. On the other hand, Macapanpan focused her research regarding dental histology. Nieva Basa Eraña-Velázquez was the first Filipino woman dentist. The founder of prosthodontics in the Philippines, Dr. Rufino Achacoso is well-known for his work in advancing the field of prosthodontics. Serving multiple Philippine presidents, he is remembered for his engaging lectures and love of music.

== Military dentists ==
Philippine Republic Act No. 481 created the Dental Corps of the Armed Forces of the Philippines, making it a technical service separate from the military's Medical Service. This law was sponsored by congressman and dental physician Ricardo Ladrido.

== Dental associations ==
After the founding of the Sociedad dental de Filipinas in 1908, another organization known as the National Dental Association was established in 1924. After World War II and the Japanese military occupation of the Philippines, on August 12, 1945, these two organizations joined to form the Philippine Dental Association (PDA). The PDA was inaugurated on September 7, 1945. In some sources, the founding year of the Philippine Dental Association is attributed to the year 1908, the year when the Sociedad dental de Filipinas was established.

== Dental publications ==
Among the official dentistry organs published in the Philippines during the American era was the Odontologia Filipina of the Colegio Dental del Liceo de Manila (Philippine Dental College). Its editor was Gregrorio Agramon. In 1924, The National Dental Review was published by the National Dental Association under the editorship of Dr. Eladio Aldecoa. After the union of the Sociedad dental de Filipinas and the National Dental Association after World War II to form the Philippine Dental Association, the Philippine Dental Association published its first issue of its official publication known as Journal of the Philippine Dental Association in January 1948.

== Marker from the National Historical Commission of the Philippines ==
Historical marker

In recognition of its place in Philippine history and society, a historical marker was installed by the National Historical Commission of the Philippines for the dentistry profession. The marker entitled Dental Profession in the Philippines was installed in 1961 at the Philippine Dental Association building, Ayala Avenue, Makati City.

English Text
IN 1850 PROFESSIONAL DENTISTRY BEGAN IN THE PHILIPPINES WHEN M. FERTRI, A FRENCH DENTIST FROM HONGKONG, ESTABLISHED A CLINIC IN MANILA AT CORNER BARBOSA AND R. HIDALGO, QUIAPO. FIRST FILIPINO TO PRACTICE DENTISTRY WAS JOSE AREVALO, BETTER KNOWN AS CAPITAN CHENGCHENG, 1852; HIS DAUGHTER CATALINA AREVALO MEJIA WAS FIRST FILIPINO WOMAN DENTIST. FIRST DENTAL ASSOCIATION, SOCIEDAD DENTAL DE FILIPINAS, ORGANIZED AT CORNER ESCOLTA AND SODA, MANILA, BY SEVERAL DENTISTS HEADED BY DR. G. R. MATEO AND INAUGURATED FEBRUARY 1908; FIRST RECOGNIZED DENTAL COLLEGE, COLECTIO DENTAL DEL LICEO DE MANILA, June 12, 1912, LATER RENAMED PHILIPPINE DENTAL COLLEGE; FIRST DENTAL PUBLICATION, JOURNAL OF THE PHILIPPINE DENTAL ASSOCIATION PUBLISHED JANUARY 1948.

COMPLIMENTS OF DR. G. ERAÑA

== See also ==
- Dental degree
- Dental education throughout the world
- History of dentistry
- Equine dentistry
- History of medicine in the Philippines
- History of veterinary medicine in the Philippines
- Human tooth
- Outline of dentistry and oral health
- Women in dentistry

== Bibliography ==
- Robles, Gonzalo S. A History of Dentistry in the Philippines, Professionals Publishing Company, 1968, 427 pages
- The Journal of the Philippine Dental Association: a treasury of dental history, Ceballos LM, J Philipp Dent Assoc. March 21, 1968, PubMed for MEDLINE
