= Physical therapy in the Philippines =

The history of physical therapy in the Philippines relates how physical therapy started in the Philippines and how it evolved as a profession through three significant phases in the history of the Philippines: from the American era leading to the Japanese occupation of the islands during World War II, and up to the modern-day time period of the independent Philippine Republics. It was introduced in the Philippines ahead of rehabilitation medicine.

== American era (1898–1946) ==
=== University of Santo Tomas ===
Physical therapy training in the Philippines, in its early form, started when the Department of Medicine of the Faculty of Medicine and Surgery of the University of Santo Tomas established the Section of Electrotherapeutics during school year of 1908–1909, under the directorship of Dr. Bonito Valdes. The assistant director was Eulalio Martines and the professor of Therapeutics and Electrotherapy was Dr. Ignacio Valdes. In 1916, the curriculum used by the Faculty of Medicine and Surgery at the University of Santo Tomas to teach physiotherapy was alongside teaching radiography.

=== Sternberg General Hospital ===
In August 1938, there was one US Army physical therapist assigned at the Sternberg General Hospital in Manila.

=== Philippine General Hospital ===
In 1949, the Philippine General Hospital (PGH) established its own Physiotherapy Section under the management of the Department of Radiology.

== Independent Philippine-Republics era (1946–present) ==
=== Schools of physical therapy ===
==== Undergraduate level ====
After the relocation of the Philippine Orthopedic Center (POC, the center was first known as the Mandaluyong General Hospital in 1945 and later successively as Mandaluyong Emergency Hospital, National Orthopedic Hospital in 1948, National Orthopedic Hospital-Rehabilitation Medical Center (NOH-RMC) in 1982, before becoming the Philippine Orthopedic Center in 1989) in 1963 from Mandaluyong, Rizal to Quezon City, courses on physical therapy and occupational therapy courses were pioneered and introduced by Benjamin V. Tamesis, the then chief physician of the hospital. The two courses were later absorbed by the College of Medicine of the University of the Philippines, later transformed first as the School of Allied Medical Professions (formally known as University of the Philippines - School of Allied Medical Professions, and abbreviated as UP SAMP) and then as the College of Allied Medical Professions. At one time, the UP SAMP was the only university in the Philippines offering a bachelor's degree in Physical Therapy (BSPT).

In June 1974, a course in Bachelor of Science in Physical Therapy was offered by the Institute of Physical Therapy and the College of Rehabilitation Sciences of the University of Santo Tomas. During the time, the first two years of the four-year course was managed by the College of Science. The next two years was administered by the Faculty of Medicine and Surgery. There were 14 students who later graduated in 1977. The four-year course became a five-year course starting the school year of 1988–1989. The Institute became an autonomous entity within UST on December 15, 1993, converting the title of its head into a dean. The five-year academic program was designed to train aspiring allied medical professionals, such as physical therapist clinicians who would like to work in hospitals, out-patient physical therapy clinics, athletic and sports training facilities, skilled nursing facilities, hospices, corporate and industrial settings. In 1976, Virgen Milagrosa Institute located north of Manila, began offering the course in physical therapy which later converted to Bachelor of Science degree in Physical Therapy. In 1993, the San Juan de Dios Hospital and College began to offer a Bachelor of Science in Physical Therapy course with Dr. Bee Giok Tan-Sales as the founder and dean.

As of 2011, among the notable schools of physical therapy in the Philippines were the Angeles University Foundation, Emilio Aguinaldo College, Universidad De Manila (former City College of Manila), University of Philippines-Manila Campus, the University of Santo Tomas, the Pamantasan ng Lungsod ng Maynila ("University of the City of Manila"), the University of the East Ramon Magsaysay Memorial Medical Center, Virgen Milagrosa University Foundation, the Cebu Doctors University, the De La Salle University- Health Sciences Institute, the Far Eastern University-Nicanor Reyes Medical Foundation, the Mariano Marcos State University-Batac Campus, the Velez College, the Saint Jude College-Manila Campus, and the Iloilo Doctors' College.

=== Advanced studies level ===
==== Master's degree ====
At present, there are four institutions in the Philippines where graduate physical therapists can take a Master of Science in Physical Therapy degree. They are the Our Lady of Fatima University, Pamantasan ng Lungsod ng Maynila, University of the Philippines, and University of Santo Tomas. There are currently no schools in the Philippines that offer a Doctorate degree in Physical Therapy.

=== Regulation ===
==== Board of Examiners ====
On June 21, 1969, the Board of Examiners for Physical Therapists and Occupational Therapists in the Philippines (sometimes called as the Board of Physical and Occupational Therapy) was approved through Republic Act No. 5680, also known as the Philippine Physical and Occupational Therapy Law. The law was authored by Congressman Jose Aldeguer of Iloilo when it was still a bill. The Board of Examiners was composed of one chairperson, two physical therapist members, and two occupational therapist members. On November 2, 1972, the rules and regulations of Republic Act No. 5680 (Implementing Rules and Regulations of the Physical and Occupational Therapy Law) that the Board of Examiners has promulgated was approved.

==== Licensure examinations ====
The first licensure examination was held on July 23, 1973, for 26 physical therapists and 18 occupational therapists. In 1994 the licensure examinations became partially computerized. Fully computerized licensure examinations were conducted in 1995.

=== Rehabilitation medicine ===
In 1971, the Philippine General Hospital founded its own Department of Rehabilitation Medicine. Rehabilitation medicine is a part of physiatry (also known as physical medicine and rehabilitation or PM&R), a branch of medicine that aims to enhance and restore functional ability and quality of life to those with physical impairments or disabilities. It is related to physical therapy.

=== Residency program for physiatrists ===
In 1974, a residency program was started by the Philippine General Hospital for aspiring physiatrists. Physiatrists are medical personnel who are also known by the name rehabilitation medicine specialists. They are focused in restoring optimal function to people who had sustained injuries to the muscles, the bones, the tissues, and the nervous system (such as stroke patients).

=== Associations ===
The(PPTA) is the main organization of physical therapists in the Philippines. It was founded by the first Bachelor of Science degree in Physical Therapy graduates of the University of the Philippines - School of Allied Medical Professions on December 8, 1964. The founding president of PPTA is Jose Inoturan. Apart from being accredited by the Professional Regulation Commission (PRC) of the Philippines, it is also a member of the international organization known as the World Confederation for Physical Therapy (WCPT).
