= Mental health in the Philippines =

Mental health in the Philippines is the survey of the status of psychological, psychiatric, and emotional healthcare in the country.

Beliefs about mental illness in the Philippines have evolved from precolonial views of supernatural causes (requiring intervention from a babaylan or folk healer) to the introduction of institutional care with the Spanish colonization.

== History ==
=== Precolonial ===
The precolonial peoples of the Philippines believed that mental aberrations had supernatural causes. These were usually attributed to malevolent spirits or angered deities, who were seen as potential bringers of punishment and disease. They were also capable of possessing humans, especially if they felt slighted by the person's actions. Appeasing or repelling them was therefore considered as the solution to any deviant behavioral conditions.

Often, addressing issues like psychosis or delusions required the intervention of a local medium or folk healer, known in many regions as babaylan. They made offerings to the spirit or deity, using animal entrails to determine if their interventions succeeded. When the medium was possessed, they were given instructions on how the afflicted should repair their relationship with the supernatural world. In doing so, the deviant behavior was expected to go away. Apart from folk healers, good-luck talismans or amulets (anting-anting) were used to protect against mental aberrations.

=== Spanish colonization ===
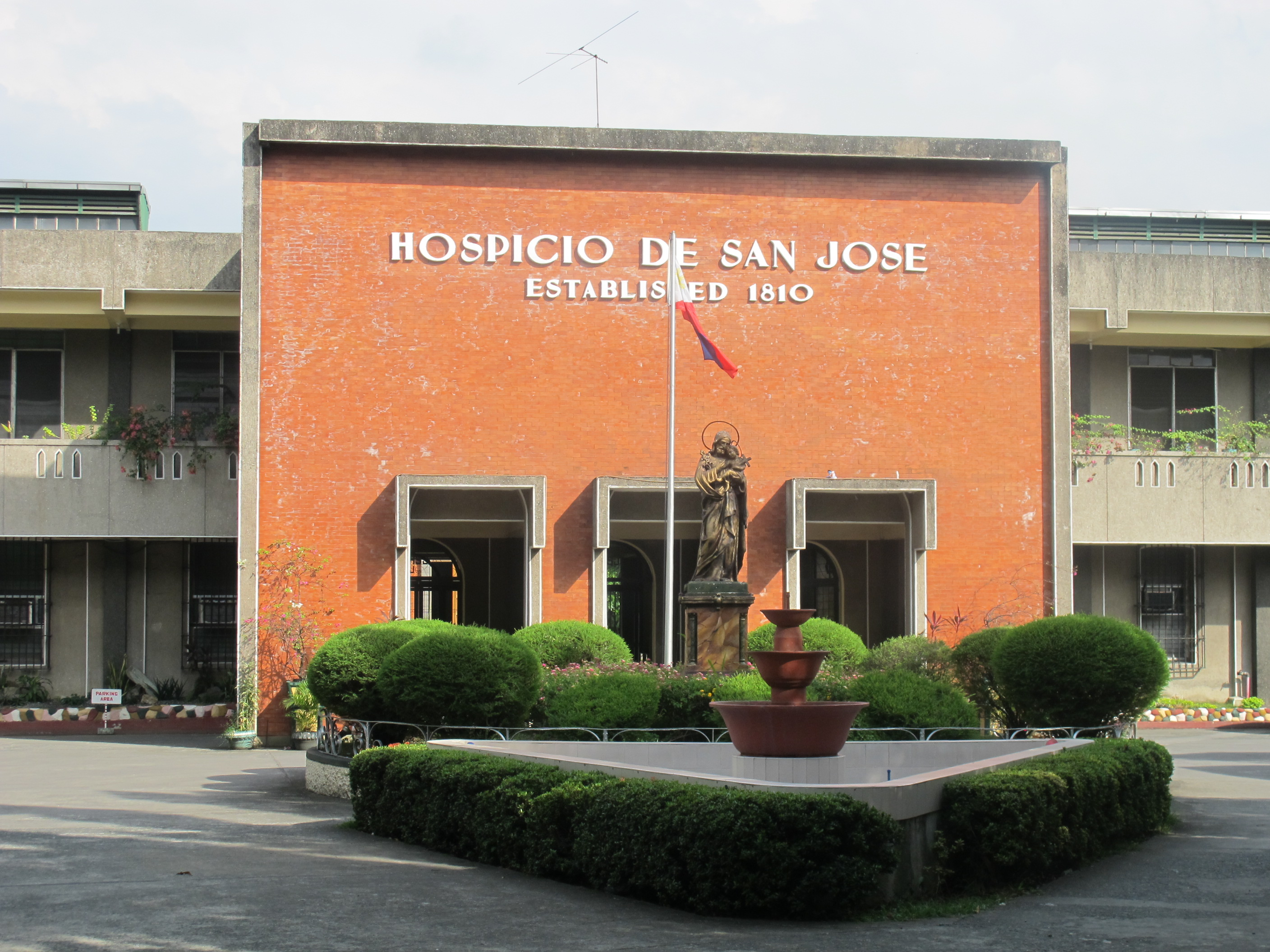
Hospicio de San Jose, the first establishment in the Philippines to provide institutional care for mental health patients

The Spanish Empire began colonizing the Philippines in 1565, introducing Roman Catholicism and Western medicine. In the capital Manila in 1782, a religious order established Hospicio de San Jose, which provided the islands' first system of institutional care for mental illnesses and disabilities. Apart from Manileños, Hospicio de San Jose admitted patients from as far north as Ilocos region and as far south as Iloilo City. Most of those admitted were indios (transl. indigenous). The hospice also accommodated other marginalized groups, such as orphans and the elderly.

During the Spanish colonial period, those who had mental health conditions were called dementes (transl. "mentally disturbed"). Admitted patients were categorized into five types; the most common one, dementes, had no criminal records. Those who did were either demente presos, admitted due to aggressive behavior while incarcerated, or procesados, who were recently sentenced by a local judge for serious crimes like infanticide. Fugados were dementes who escaped confinement from the Hospicio and caught by authorities, whereas curados were considered sane enough to reintegrate into society.

Reflecting indigenous beliefs, Catholics thought that demonic possessions were the root of mental disorders. The concept of locura o furor (transl. "madness") was pervasive in early modern Spain, and individuals struck with the so-called disease were taken to a church for exorcism. Despite the strong influence of Roman Catholicism, folk healers were still consulted to expel the demon.

=== Contemporary period ===
On March 2, 2004, Republic Act No. 9258 or the Guidance and Counseling Act of 2004 was approved.

On March 16, 2009, Republic Act No. 10029 or the Philippine Psychology Act of 2009 was approved.

On June 20, 2018, Republic Act No. 11036 or the Mental Health Act was approved.

On December 6, 2024, Republic Act No. 12080 or the Basic Education Mental Health and Well-Being Promotions Act was approved.

On June 30, 2026, the Civil Service Commission (CSC) issued a qualification standard (QS) for Schools Division Counselor, School Counselor, and School Counselor Association.

== Existing conditions ==
=== Processes in the healthcare system ===
There are three tiers in the health care system: primary, secondary, and tertiary. The primary health care tier serves as a patient's first point of contact with a health professional who can provide outpatient medical care. If the general practitioner cannot address the problem of the patient, then the patient is referred to a specialist. Mental health care specialists, which belong to secondary health care, include psychologists and psychiatrists. In the Philippines, most psychiatrists are in private practice, although some work in government institutions such as the National Center for Mental Health. Psychiatrists provide the patient with services such as assessment, counselling, and/or prescription drugs if needed. In the tertiary health care, patient would be referred to institutions if the mental illness needs specialized care that is beyond the capabilities of the specialist.

Some health care systems put psychologists and psychiatrists under the category of primary care providers. In this case, short hospital visits and consultation-liaison services to other medical departments would fall under secondary health care. More severe mental health diagnoses would require more rehabilitation, which is within the scope of tertiary health care.

=== Institutions ===
Mental health facilities and institutions are maintained in the Philippines by both private and public groups but access to them remains uneven throughout the country. Most facilities are located in the National Capital Region (NCR) and other major cities in the country, thus favoring individuals who live near these more urban areas.

==== National Center for Mental Health ====
The National Center for Mental Health (NCMH), originally named Insular Psychopathic Hospital, was established in 1925 under the Public Works Act 3258. At the time, the City Sanitarium and San Lazaro Hospital were the only primary institutions that catered for the needs of the mentally ill, however, due to the large volume of patients pouring in, there was a need to build another institution that could provide for the needs of patients with mental illness. The 64-hectare site is located in Mandaluyong.

The institution officially opened on December 17, 1928, accepting 379 patients who were all crowding in San Lazaro Hospital. In 1930, the bed capacity was increased to 800, although the total number of patients was over 836. Two pavilions were added to increase the bed capacity to 1,600. By 1935, the City Sanitarium closed, and leaving NCMH with 1,646 patients to serve.

Aside from being a hospital, NCMH is authorized by the Department of Health (DOH) as a Special Research Training Center. According to the NCMH website, the hospital is "mandated to render a comprehensive (preventive, promotive, curative and rehabilitative) range of quality mental health services nationwide". Aside from this, NCMH also offers a 4-year psychiatric residency training program for doctors and a 2-year psychiatric nursing program for nurses specializing in psychiatric care. There are also affiliation programs that cater to students from the fields of psychology, pharmacy, and nursing, among others.

NCMH currently occupies 46.7 hectares of land, with 35 pavilions/cottages, and 52 wards, as well as facilities such as medical infirmary, library, chapel, conference rooms, tennis court, basketball court, multi-purpose hall and dormitories. As of 2011, the numbers of staff are as follows: 88 doctors, 890 nursing staff, 116 medical ancillary personnel, and 446 administrative support staff. The hospital also received from the government a budget allocation worth PHP 523, 982, 000, which costs an average of Php 118.61 per patient per day.

Currently, NCMH has a bed capacity of 4,600 and serves an average of 3,000 in-patients on a daily basis, in addition to 56, 000 outpatients per year. Most patients come from Metro Manila and nearby regions III and IV. They also serve patients from other regions, often forensic cases referred by the courts. Subsidy for treatments is given to 87% of the inpatients which belong to classes C and D. The institution received its ISO 9001:2008 certification on December 2, 2015.

==== Philippine Mental Health Association, Inc. ====
The Philippine Mental Health Association, or PMHA, is "a private, non-stock, non-profit organization dedicated to the promotion of mental health and prevention of mental disorders." Its headquarters is located in Quezon City with nine chapters all over the Philippines: PMHA Bacolod-Negros Occidental, Baguio-Benguet, Cabanatuan-Nueva Ecija, Cagayan de Oro-Misamis Oriental, Cebu, Dagupan-Pangasinan, Davao, Dumaguete-Negros Oriental, and Lipa-Batangas.

It was established on January 15, 1950, with Dr. Manuel Arguelles as president due to the call for assessment of mental health problems induced by World War II. At present, their programs range from Education and Information Services (EIS), Clinical and Diagnostic Services (CDS), and Intervention Services (IS).

The PMHA provides guidance and educational programs for the youth through partnering with various private and public schools and colleges in the country. They also organize seminars and workshops for youth mental health through their EIS arm.

The Association officially expanded its services to the adult population in 1960. They now provide psychiatric, psychological, and counseling services to all sectors of society under CDS. They also launched Rehabilitation Care Services in 1962 to assist in the recovery and reintegration of patients into the community.

The Association's IS arm has two centers: the Center for Children and Youth (CCY) and the Adult Work Center (AWC). The CCY provides various kinds of therapy sessions and counseling along with special education for those with learning disorders and intellectual disability. The AWC provides life skills training and family programs to assist mental health patients in their recovery and therapy.

==== Other Institutions ====
In the National Capital Region (NCR), most major hospitals (both public and private) have a psychiatric department which caters to the need of people with mental illness. Hospitals include The Medical City, Philippine General Hospital (PGH), Manila Doctors Hospital, and University of the East Ramon Magsaysay Memorial Medical Center, Inc. (UERMMMC), to name a few.

Webbline provides a list of mental health care facilities that can be found in the provinces and in NCR.

=== Suicide prevention hotlines ===
A crisis and suicide prevention hotline called Hopeline was launched in 2016, to assist people who may need psychological or psychiatric services. The Department of Health funded the project until 2019, when it transferred its resources to establishing the NCMH's crisis hotline.

== Government initiatives ==
=== National legislation ===
The Philippines' first law addressing mental health was passed in 2018. It was given the name Mental Health Act, officially known as Republic Act 11036. Its primary goals include upholding the rights of people with mental conditions, prohibiting discrimination against them, and improving the accessibility of comprehensive health services. The law is based on international human rights standards, specifically the United Nations' Principles for the Protection of Persons with Mental Illness.

The law mandates the DOH, Commission on Human Rights, Department of Justice, and various hospitals in support of those with mental health problems. Mental health services are proposed to be accessible from large-scale hospitals, down to the barangay level. Health and medical courses will include mandatory courses in mental health, so as to fully equip healthcare professionals.

The Mental Health Act has received criticism for the implementation and effectiveness of its services. Critics, including researchers, have commented on the programs' being outdated, underfunded, and understaffed. They also have written about the need for more health equity, especially for geographically isolated Filipinos and vulnerable demographics like older persons, children, and displaced people. Mental health resources accounted for only around 5% of government spending on healthcare in 2023.

The PPA launched a petition at MHActNow.org in 2015, and garnered upwards of 10,000 supporters. However, their goal of 200,000 was not reached. There have also been social media discourses using the hashtag #MHActNow wherein netizens raise awareness about why they deem a local Mental Health Law to be important.

Philippine legislators in the Congress and Senate have also filed House Bill No. 5347 and Senate Bill No. 2910. Senate initiatives to the Mental Health act include Senate Bill 2910, filed by Senator Pia Cayetano in 2015 and Loren Legarda in 2014. In Congress, Representatives Leni Gerona-Robredo, Romero Quimbo, Ibarra Gutierrez, Walden Bello, Karlo Alexei Nograles, Kaka Bag-ao and Emmi de Jesus all introduced House Bill 5347, in line with Philippine Mental Health Act, in 2015. The original draft underwent 22 versions, upon consultation with stakeholders, patients and family groups.

=== National Mental Health Program ===
The Philippines has a National Mental Health Program or Mental Health Policy (Administrative Order #8 s.2001) signed by then-secretary of the DOH, Manuel Dayrit.

This policy aims to promote a better quality of mental health care in the country, to reduce the burden of mental illness, and to protect the rights of people affected by mental illnesses.

Programs of the DOH under the Mental Health Policy include the improvement of the promoting of knowledge of mental health, national and local provision of services and facilities regarding the treatment of mental health, support for the research and training on mental health, and other initiatives. The National Program Management Committee and the Program Development and Management teams were organized in order to oversee and manage the development of the program and to create the protocols regarding the specific policies that were implemented.

Other stakeholders or partners for this program include the Philippine Psychiatric Association (PPA), the National Center for Mental Health (NCMH), the Philippine Mental Health Association, and Christoffel Blindenmission (CBM), an international organization that advocates for disabled people in poor countries.

The Philippine government spends around 5% of the health budget on mental health, mostly going to the maintenance of mental hospitals. Medicine for mental illnesses are provided in government-run mental health institutions. Social insurance covers mental health concerns, but only for acute inpatient care.

According to a report done by the World Health Organization in 2007, access to mental health institutions in the Philippines favors those near the National Capital Region. The majority of the psychiatrists in the country also work in private practice rather than in government facilities. There has not been any increase in the number of beds available for patients in mental health institutions during 2002–2007.

Regarding research on mental health, there have been several studies done, although not all were published in indexed journals. The available facilities for mental health have also increased throughout the Philippines and policies have been implemented to improve the quality of life of mental hospital inpatients.

=== Person with Disability card ===
A template for a Person with Disability (PWD) card

Under the Republic Acts 9442 and 10754, Filipinos with psychosocial or mental disorders can register as a Person with Disability (PWD). The law states that they can avail themselves of financial and educational benefits that improve quality of life, allowing them to fully participate in society. These include discounts, such as on medicine; essential groceries; services in restaurants, hotels, and private hospitals; tickets to films and concerts; and travel fares. Other benefits include express lanes in all establishments, and educational assistance like scholarships and subsidies.

To register as a PWD, applicants generally submit a properly completed application form, multiple ID pictures, and a certificate of mental disability from a licensed physician. The application is reviewed by their local government unit's (LGU) Persons with Disability Affairs Office (PDAO). Once verified, the applicant will be encoded to the DOH's Philippine Registry for Persons with Disabilities. The Department of Social Welfare and Development (DSWD) issues ID cards for PWDs, who may claim their cards at the local PDAO.

The national registry is constantly incomplete and not updated in real time. Currently, PWD ID systems are decentralized, varying by the LGU. The issue has led to the spreading of fraudulent cards, which prompted several restaurants across the Philippines in 2024 to announce they will have to verify ID cards before giving discounts. Lawmakers clarified that this was unnecessary and violated PWD rights, saying that incomplete verification was not a valid reason to withhold benefits. In response, the DSWD announced plans to implement a more unified system by the end of 2025.

== Seeking mental health care ==
Most studies on the help-seeking patterns of Filipinos draw conclusions about Filipinos as a whole. There is a lack of more targeted research addressing those who do have mental illnesses, like depression.

Mental health stigma is a major contributor to avoiding psychiatrists, psychologists, or counselors; it is an issue reinforced by the country's traditional values. Filipino culture is highly collectivist and family-oriented – values like pakikipagkapwa and pakikisama reflect the importance of expressing solidarity with one's in-group. However, the exact ways that traditional values and cultural stigma negatively affect Filipinos' help-seeking patterns require further studying.

According to available research, pakikipagkapwa might cause apprehension towards seeking professionals because sharing sensitive secrets or emotions is often done only with people deemed trustworthy. A fear of dishonoring one's family or society (hiya, transl. shame) might also exacerbate distrust, as mental health professionals are often considered to belong to the person's outgroup. As such, relatives or close friends are generally preferred over (or alongside) them for seeking advice or consolation. In the absence of strong social networks, some Filipinos may opt to rely only on themselves. Some research suggests that it may develop their sense of self-resilience and independence. Due to the country's collectivist culture, they may feel encouraged to change their behavioral or mental states to better meet societal expectations.

Current data suggests that many Filipinos seek professional care only after conditions become too debilitating. At first, they may try to preserve their sense of normalcy; some even reject that there are issues to address. What usually prompts them to finally seek help are significant changes in behavior, sleeping patterns, or performance at work.

== Mental health stigma ==
In general, people with mental illness are discriminated against more in developing countries in Asia compared to Western countries. Unlike somatic symptoms, psychological symptoms are seen as socially disadvantageous, affecting their work and marriage.

Those with mental disorders are seen as dangerous and aggressive. Disturbed behaviors manifested by people with severe mental illness are more easily recognized; however, the public cannot easily distinguish them from more common and milder disorders. This results in a generalized view of mentally ill people as violent. In addition to the public, family members of the mentally ill can be a source of stigma.

It seems that there is a lack of information regarding mental illnesses in developing countries. In some Asian cultures, there is a pervasive belief that supernatural forces are behind mental illness, and as such, religious and magical approaches are utilized to treat people. Additionally, in many Asian cultures, the culture is a collectivist culture and the discussion of mental health illnesses is not socially accepted. In more extreme situations, the discussion of mental health struggles is viewed as particularly disrespectful. This assumption of mental health illnesses in the Philippines leads to the intense mental health stigma to continue.

Several programs and initiatives are pursued in order to strengthen mental health support and to lessen the stigma against mental illnesses and mentally ill people in the Philippines. This includes studies conducted by both private and government entities, laws on mental health, government health programs, and mental health institutions.Mental illness, psychological disorders and emotional dysfunctions are significantly widespread throughout the Philippines, due to the large poverty population and the numerous out-of-school or out-of-work youths. These "psychotic vagrants", as some would call them, are gravely misunderstood. They are commonly called "taong grasa or "abnoy". The phrase "taong grasa" is referred to as a slang term, and is the English equivalent to "grease monkey" and/or is used when referencing a "dirty person". The phrase "abnoy" translates to "abnormal" in English, and it also used as a slang term to mean "weirdo". These phrases is used to demean another person, and are typically used when an individual has a mental illness. This type of interaction shows a generally simplistic attitude towards issues concerning mental health within the communities in the Philippines.

=== Mental health in other laws ===
Certain laws contain provisions for the protection of the rights of the mentally ill. The Magna Carta for Disabled Persons (Republic Act No. 7277) considers those with a mental illness to be disabled. This law protects their interests regarding employment, education, and health. This law states that the government will establish centers for special education in all regions of the Philippines for those visually impaired, hearing impaired and intellectually disabled. It also hold state universities to be responsible for a Special Education (SPED) course if need be.

According to the Family Code of The Philippines (Executive Order No. 209), in the event where the adoption of an adopted minor with mental disability is rescinded, the state will provide a guardian over him/her.

The Comprehensive Dangerous Drug Act (Republic Act No. 9165) was passed in 2002 in order to control problems with drug abuse. Drug abuse was seen both as a direct and indirect cause of mental illness among people in the economically productive age group. The law guarantees a minimum of 12 years in prison, as well as fines ranging from Php 100,000 to Php 10,000,000 against offenders. The act protects mentally incapacitated individuals along with minors who are victimized by drug pushers (either by selling them drugs or involving them in illicit activities). A person found guilty of the above shall be given the maximum penalty.

== Intersection with other national issues ==
=== Special Needs Education ===
Special education (SPED) in the Philippines, also referred to as special needs education (SNED) under Republic Act No. 11650, is an instructional program or service designed for learners with disabilities (LWDs). Its implementation is overseen by the Department of Education (DepEd), Department of Health (DOH), Department of Social Welfare and Development (DSWD), and other government agencies.

=== War on drugs ===
The Philippine war on drugs (WoD) started in 2016, when Rodrigo Duterte became president. During his administration, he ordered the killing of thousands of Filipinos suspected of trading illegal drugs. Many who were killed, including children, never used or dealt drugs before; they were also disadvantaged socioeconomically.

Witnesses of WoD-related killings – especially grieving relatives – were correlated with severe mental distress. These were indicators of possible post-traumatic stress disorder, alongside other mental health conditions. Children and adolescents were observed to develop maladaptive behaviors, such as emotional instability, after witnessing the death of a relative. They were also likely to face bullying and other forms of ostracism.

Psychological stressors of the victims' relatives were often worsened by poverty and health inequities, which meant that finding mental health care was nearly impossible. Access to help from local human rights organizations was also limited, because families who attempted to do so were discouraged or threatened by authorities. Duterte himself reinforced a stigma against members of such organizations by stating he would "kill [and] decapitate" them alongside drug addicts.

Researchers have advocated for the Philippine government's drug laws to incorporate harm reduction strategies and follow a more human rights–based approach. Several scholars recommend better access to mental health services, reforms to drug-testing procedures, and a focus on rehabilitation instead of punitive justice and criminalization. Other advocacies include education about the psychology of drug abuse, establishment of peer support groups, and nationwide implementation of opioid agonist therapy. Future policy-making efforts shall be informed by quantitative data on the long-term mental health consequences of those affected by the drug war's extrajudicial killings, of which there is an extreme lack.

=== Natural and environmental disasters ===
Environmental psychology in the Philippines, an extremely typhoon-prone country, is an emerging field. Recent studies, like a 2021 online global survey in The Lancet Planetary Health, have begun exploring climate anxiety among Filipino youth in particular. Current understanding of their psychology is that their mental well-being has been correlated with significant levels of climate anxiety, guilt, hopelessness, and grief. The survey, which studied the climate-related mental health of adolescents and young adults in ten countries, found that the Philippines had the greatest number of respondents with high or extremely high climate anxiety. A 2023 article by psychology professor John Aruta in the International Journal of Psychology highlights the need for further research in how climate change affects the mental health of Filipinos of other social backgrounds. These include Filipinos who have low socioeconomic status, live in isolated regions, and reside in areas more vulnerable to droughts or typhoons.

Disasters and tragedies tax the human mind and spirit and can cause severe mental and emotional breakdowns. Losing loved ones and sources of livelihood, such as farmlands and businesses can have mental and emotional effects on survivors. These types of tragedies are common all over the world, and are particularly common in the Philippines due to the high levels of poverty.

Volunteers have provided psychological first aid, beginning with early intervention which is implemented in the immediate aftermath of disaster. It is designed to reduce the initial distress and foster an adaptive mechanism for survivors in all age groups. Effective interventions can: restore function and enhance recovery; create a safe and secure environment; reduce uncertainty, fear, and anxiety; and mobilize family and social supports.

To address the psychosocial concerns of the typhoon victims during Ondoy, a task force on Mental Health Psycho-Social Support (MHPSS) was formed headed by the Health Emergencies Management Staff of the DOH as chair and lead agency based on Memorandum 15 series of 2008 issued by the National Disaster Coordinating Council (NDCC), and the DSWD as co-chair.

The members of the Task Force came from national government agencies (NGAs), academe, non-government organizations and faith-based private sectors, with mental health and psycho-social support programs. Some of the members of the MHPSS Task Force visited the children in evacuation centers in Marikina, Philippine Sports Arena (formerly ULTRA) and Bagong Silangan. The children listened to Bible stories told by the volunteers, learned songs and played games. Likewise, the volunteers encouraged the children to play with toys and draw pictures of their experiences. According to Secretary Esperanza I. Cabral, the MHPSS Task Force conducted psychosocial training and orientation, psychosocial and psycho/spiritual processing, and critical incident stress debriefing to some 8,770 adult-victims of typhoon 'Ondoy' who were in evacuation centers, as well as play therapy sessions with 3,075 children-victims and 704 service providers and disaster relief workers.

The World Health Organization (WHO) based in the Philippines has been training local health workers in psychological first aid community-based mental health care for addressing mental health needs. One of the latest cases includes the rehabilitation after the typhoon Yolanda. Health problems still emerged months after the disaster situations. At the presence of a safe place, there would be the experiences of headache and insomnia. There is usually an increase of people reporting with mental health problems 3–6 months after a disaster. The reasons cited for this increase included the trauma caused by the typhoon and also the washed out medications from those who already had mental health problems, whose none maintenance caused relapse.

=== Migrant workers ===
As of 2008, Philippine women account for around 50 percent of the migrant workers. In 2009, about forty percent of the Filipinas who migrated were household service workers. Filipina domestic workers are most especially vulnerable to abusive working conditions because of their work's live-in nature.

In a study published in 2011, interviewing 500 domestic workers who worked abroad about 55% experienced stress during their time abroad, with more than half also vulnerable to psycho-emotional symptoms during their stay abroad. Accordingly, the number of psycho-emotional symptoms decreased while in the Philippines compared to when they were abroad. It was the same trend among the psychological manifestations of stress. Only three percent sought the help of a mental health professional, with the majority opting to talk to a pastor instead about their psycho-social symptoms.

Labor migration in the Philippines is based on a passive nature, with many seeking to work abroad to escape family division or economic failure. As a result, many perceive one's success as whether they are able to make a new life for themselves abroad. However, the lives they make for themselves abroad aren't always easy. Many face barriers and challenges such as language differences abroad and separation from loved ones. Migrant work also doesn't always ensure a rise in one's social standing. Women who work abroad face social decline in their careers, racial barriers, and gender limitations. Furthermore, Filipina migrant workers are often denied certain privileges granted to other citizens and workers, often facing exclusion and abuse. For example, in Singapore, Filipinas are not protected by the Employer Act and are thus vulnerable to abuse by their employers, such as working longer hours and having to follow harsh regulations.

These struggles are made even more evident in the lives of domestic workers and caregivers. Filipina migrant workers who take on jobs as caregivers face the challenges of developing emotional bonds with the children they care for. While such bond may fulfill recognition that these women seek in their jobs, they often suffer from deep emotional loss at job termination and detachment from their own families. The move of Filipina migrant workers also poses a challenge to their familial relations, especially between husband and wife. These women often face anxiety out of fear that husbands are unable to perform their new role as both the father and mother at home. Husbands taking on the domestic role are often seen as a threat to their masculinity and often indulge in extramarital affairs or simply do not take on the duties of their new role.

=== COVID-19 pandemic ===
Studies on the COVID-19 pandemic's effect on Filipinos' mental health tended to focus on anxiety, stress, and depression. Their impact was often measured to be moderate-to-severe. Research on Filipinos during quarantine suggested that single people, children and adolescents, and people without children experienced these psychological outcomes more severely. Overall, their quality of life was negatively affected due to mental health stressors that arose due to the pandemic. This was assessed based on their financial status, sense of safety at home, and trust in government institutions.

The studies discussed the pandemic's moderate-to-severe effects on frontline health workers, educators, students, and children. Public health nurses and other frontliners reported an increase in occupational burnout, due to fears of being infected and persistent exposure to patients in distress. Learners developed feelings of boredom and sadness after sudden shifts to work-from-home setups, and several experienced anxiety due to concerns about food, money, and access to the Internet. Children were less represented in available literature, although they were shown to be at higher risk of domestic violence and child labor due partly to increasing unemployment.

Coping strategies and interventions during the pandemic in the Philippines were often collectivist. Many found support in online groups – some were religious, holding online masses and community prayers. Individual strategies also included task-focused coping and stress management; strategies at the organizational level involved mental health awareness programs and flexible work arrangements. The Philippine government promoted the NCMH and Hopeline hotlines as a virtual means of seeking help, but insufficient access to the Internet and cellular devices limited the strategy's effectiveness.

The pandemic's impact intersected with other national issues. Natural disasters like floods and earthquakes forced many to leave their homes, which worsened already-existing psychological stressors. Migrant workers were banned from going overseas, which further disadvantaged those who received low salaries. Those who could work abroad faced racial discrimination, among other inequities.

== Studies on Filipino mental health ==
Studies and data regarding mental health in the Philippines are collected and transmitted from mental health facilities to the government. Among the focus of mental health care professionals from both national and international agencies at present include the integration of provisions for mental health care of displaced civilian population due to calamities and wars.

=== Displaced populations ===
It is not uncommon in different nations, especially in a developing country to have minority groups. Minority groups as how sociologist Louis Wirth defines it is, "a group of people who, because of their physical or cultural characteristics, are singled out from the others in the society in which they live for differential and unequal treatment, and who therefore regard themselves as objects of collective discrimination". Those that are displaced populations can be considered as part of minority group since they are singled out in the society. Amerasians and Mindanao refugees are examples. If "normal" individuals from minority groups are already deprived of some privileges and even rights of a Filipino citizen and even human rights at large, how much more those that are mentally ill or psychologically incapacitated how are coming from minority groups.

Moreover, pop culture, in this day and age, has the power to define what is normal and what is not as far as trends are concerned, leaving the minority groups or those that are in displaced populations with no chance of being defined as normal or well or "ok" compared to the rest. With that stigma, the mental health of these people is affected. Hence, it is also aimed that better mental services be provided to them.

==== Amerasians ====
Amerasians are children abandoned as babies and children of American military personnel from militarily occupied nation-states. As of 2012–2013, about 200,000-250,000 of military Amerasians are currently residing in the country. Amerasians in the present are a recognizable marginal group. In 2011, the DSWD Secretary Corazon Soliman admitted that the nation's top federal welfare agency was no longer providing special assistance or attention to the Amerasians. In addition, many traditional NGO's (The Philippine Children's Fund of America, the Pearls S. Buck Foundation, Preda, Inc.) has reduced or phased out Amerasian aid programs or have moved on to servicing current humanitarian needs. Insofar, a study was given to more than 50,000 military Amerasian children from Central Luzon for interventions given the traits of depression, elevated anxiety, joblessness, social isolation, substance and alcohol abuse, and housing insecurity.

==== Mindanao Refugees ====
A study was conducted to conduct a model of mental health care that integrates mental health into primary care for displaced civilians in Mindanao. The forty-six year episodes of violence between the government and anti-government groups to civilian displacement in that community. The results showed that simple mental health approaches such as psychological first aid and brief psychotherapy can be integrated into primary health care. Brief psychotherapy sessions provided at primary level to patients with common mental disorders can potentially improve patients' symptoms of distress, within a few sessions based from the retrospective analysis of patient data.

=== Filipino children ===
Based on the WHO collaborative study on strategies for mental health care, 238 children from Sampaloc, Manila were screened in the clinic. A total of 68 children were tested positive with a mental illness, where 68 children (14%) possessed a psychiatric syndrome and 5 children (two percent) were intellectually impaired. 36 of the children (15%) possessed both a psychiatric syndrome and intellectual disability. Between 12 and 29% of children are diagnosed with mental health problems while entering primary health care.

== See also ==
- Mental health of Filipino Americans
