= Mental health of Asian Americans =

Issues and problems for Asian American mental health

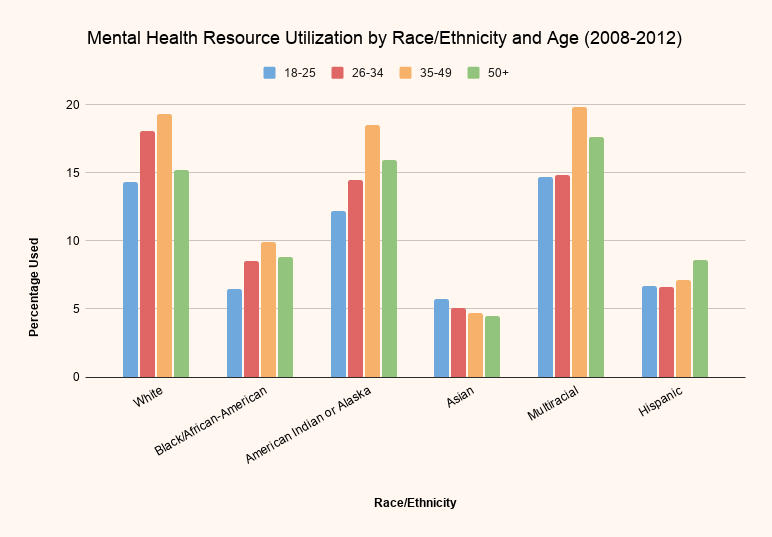
This image conveys the underutilization of mental health resources by Asian Americans from 2008 through 2012

Concern about the mental health of Asian Americans has been raised as the Asian population in the United States is rising. According to the US Department of Health and Human Services Office of Minority Health, the leading cause of death among Asian Americans aged 15–24 is suicide. Asian Americans tend to underutilize resources, especially those that are not deemed culturally competent. Studies suggest that Asian American patients tend to ignore the emotional symptoms of mental illness and only report physical ones to doctors, resulting in misdiagnosis.

== Mental disorders ==
=== Anxiety ===
Matthew R. Lee, Sumie Okazaki and Hyung Chol Yoo, conducted a study based on self-reports that determined that Asian American university students experience an overall higher level of anxiety compared with their European American counterparts. Sources that collected data through a non-self-report method showed that although many Asian American students claimed that they felt this heightened anxiety most in the context of social situations, this increased anxiety was not noticeable by those around them. This elevated social anxiety could be explained by the fact that Asian Americans usually find themselves in spaces where they are in the minority, whereas European Americans are more likely to relate to those around them culturally. Additionally, they may have felt a greater pressure to keep their anxiety hidden for this same reason, as being in the minority would have placed a great deal of pressure on their social interactions.

=== Depression ===
Immigration to a new country and the pressure to assimilate can result in higher rates of depression. This is prevalent in the Asian American community. Depression among Asian American college students is especially high. Due to the academic pressure as well as the isolation felt by many who are away from home for the first time, depression can potentially lead to suicide under these circumstances. One contributing factor includes toxic masculinity culture, which discourages men from expressing their emotions. As the Asian culture already encourages its community to deal with issues privately, the resulting pressure to suppress emotions can create deep depression for Asian American men.

=== Suicide ===
Asian Americans, in comparison with White Americans, have much higher suicide rates. This is especially evident on college campuses, where Asian American students make up a disproportionate number of annual suicides. Theories to explain high rates of suicide among Asian Americans vary from cultural suppression of mental health to high academic pressures. In Indian communities, suicide is sometimes viewed as an act that is self-serving due to the negative impacts that suicide has on family members. This cultural stereotype is reinforced by the word used for suicide in the Hindi language, "khud kushi", which is often mispronounced as "khud khushi", the Hindi word for "self-happiness". These types of cultural stigmas can lead to fewer people reaching out for much-needed help, therefore causing heightened suicide rates. Elevated rates of suicide are especially found in Asian American females. Asian American females are at the greatest risk of committing suicide compared with all other race and gender demographics. Despite high suicide rates amongst Asian Americans, this population is still perceived as 'low-risk' due to the lack of adequate information about how mental illness manifests itself among members of this population. High rates of suicide ideation is also found among Asian Americans, especially in college students.

=== Post-traumatic stress disorder ===
Research studies have determined that Southeast Asian refugees experience a higher level of Post-traumatic stress disorder (PTSD) compared with all other demographics. This could potentially be derived from trauma that refugees underwent both before and after immigration to the United States.

== Cultural considerations and stereotypes ==
=== Stigma ===
Mental health struggles tend to be stigmatized in Asian American communities. They are viewed as 'taboo' and are therefore ignored. This stigma surrounding mental health makes it difficult for Asian Americans to take advantage of resources, even when they are available. This key factor contributes to the high rates of mental health disorders seen throughout Asian American communities. Asian Americans tend to focus more on physical discomforts and do not necessarily view mental health struggles as something outside of a person's control. This belief contributes to stigma and discourages people from seeking support. The daily family life of many Asian Americans tends to contribute to his stigma, as children are encouraged to control their emotions and therefore learn to avoid sharing them with others. This can stigmatize mental health and make Asian Americans feel ashamed for experiencing symptoms of mental disorders.

=== Consequences of stigma ===
Stigmatizing mental health discourages the use of resources, even when they are available. Within the Asian American community, there is a great stigma against reaching out for help with mental health. Despite higher levels of unmet mental health needs than their White counterparts, Asian Americans hesitate to reach out for help with mental health due to "a deeply felt stigma against mental illness". This is a deep rooted issue amongst the Asian American community due to culture that encourages suppressing emotions. "Asian Americans have the lowest rates of service utilization and help-seeking behaviors (Stanley, 538)." Additional research studies have found that both in-patient and out-patient hospital resources have extremely low rates of utilization by Asian Americans compared with all other ethnicities. This low utilization is the case despite Asian Americans having higher than or comparable rates of mental illness to white Americans. "Asian Americans have a 17.30 percent overall lifetime rate of any psychiatric disorder and a 9.19 percent 12-month rate, yet Asian Americans are three times less likely to seek mental health services than Whites." Stigma and shame deter Asian Americans from utilizing mental health resources available to them. In order to adequately care for Asian Americans in the mental health field, cultural considerations must be taken into account my providers. When Asian Americans do seek out help, their tendency to focus on physical symptoms instead of emotions sometimes results in misdiagnosis.

=== Cultural influences ===
Many Asian countries have different beliefs about mental health, medicine, and treatment than their Western counterparts. For example, traditional Japanese beliefs state that "mental illness [is] caused by evil spirits", and that the traditional course of action is to avoid seeking professional help or use traditional sources of care. Though this one example is not fully representative of the traditional views of every Asian country, values such as these can be passed down through generations during daily family functioning.

This, in combination with the shared collectivist mindset, contributes to the pressure to suppress one's emotions. In studies of the individualist and collectivist levels of different countries, China in particular was found to be "both less individualistic and more collectivistic" than other countries. This can cause Asian Americans to feel as though they need to blend in with the rest of the population to maintain a positive façade, even when struggling with mental health issues themselves.

=== Transgender identity ===
The mental health of people whose identities appear to deviate from the 'norm' seem to be worse off compared with people who fit societally-accepted binaries. This especially true of those in the Asian American community. This finding is apparent through a study exploring the experience of transgender Asian Americans with mental health. A possibility that may contribute to these declining mental health rates is that traditional Asian culture leans more conservative and may not fully accept a person transitioning genders. This decline in mental health could also be a result of a lack of acceptance from society as a whole. The queer space tends to be dominated by a more monocultural, white population. Therefore, transgender Asian Americans are unlikely to find acceptance within their own cultural community or within the queer space.

== Impact of the model minority myth ==
=== Academic pressures ===
In Asian communities, education is highly prioritized as a pathway for success. However, high academic pressures from immigrant parents has been shown to have negative mental health impacts on their children. Asian American youth has higher rates of suicide ideation and lower self-esteem compared with their white counterparts. Some of these aspects of mental health can be attributed to academic pressures, but they can manifest due to being surrounded by a white majority culture that may be more difficult to relate to for Asian American students. Academic pressure also tends to manifest itself in situations in which the success of a child's education determines the financial wellbeing of an entire family. This situation can occur in circumstances of immigrant families facing poverty. This pressure contributes to the high rates of mental illness in Asian American youth. The model minority myth was also furthered by the cultural intertwining nature of expectations for academic success placed upon Asian American students. This contributes to the pressure and drive for continued perfection that many Asian American students report experiencing, causing further isolation from their peers which inevitably leads to a further decline in mental health.

=== Socioeconomic status ===
Additionally, Asian Americans being such a large and widespread racial group, the model minority myth does not take into account nuances in the different cultures and economic success of different ethnicities that fall under the Asian umbrella. This can cause people to overlook the struggles faced by many Asian Americans when it comes to mental health. Misconceptions about the success of Asian Americans as a racial group leads to many struggles being discounted. Studies convey that although Asian Americans are stereotyped as being academically and socioeconomically successful, they are actually experiencing higher rates of distress in comparison with all other racial groups.

=== Isolation ===
The model minority myth isolates Asian Americans because it alienates and ignores their struggles, causing further mental health implications. This can contribute to the high rates of anxiety and depression that we are seeing amongst this racial group. To some people, low rates of resource utilization seems to indicate a lower necessity. However, this line of thinking was found to be false and simply fed into the model minority myth.

== Impact of racism ==
=== Pressure of assimilation ===
The pressure to assimilate for Asian Americans causes undue stress. As people immigrate to the United States they are faced with having to fit into a culture that is very different from their own. Facing this pressure to 'fit in' yet also hold onto your cultural past is a large contributor to poor mental health amongst Asian Americans. The model minority myth also creates a misconception amongst the public that Asian Americans were able to perfectly assimilate into society. This can sometimes discount the struggles that Asian Americans face on a daily basis. This myth also contributes to the pressure already placed on Asian American students by cultural factors, causing a further decline in mental health.

=== Alienation ===
Racism can lead to a person feeling ostracized and invalidates. This sense of isolation can cause implications for a person's mental health as they begin to feel as though no one is facing the same struggles as they are. Through a study conducted on a Christian college campus, the impact of invalidation by one's peers on Asian American students' mental health is revealed. When students were unable to find a sense of belonging, they questioned their own identity and some even attempted to hide parts of themselves in order to fit into their community. This however had negative repercussions on their mental health, as students felt that they were trading a part of their identity for conditional acceptance. Furthermore, following the COVID-19 pandemic and rise of anti-Asian racism, Asian/Asian American people may be more vulnerable to psychological stressors.

=== Racism in healthcare ===
A lack of culturally competent resources can result in misdiagnosis when Asian Americans do seek out mental health support. These instances of misdiagnosis combined with negative experiences with medical professionals discourages Asian Americans from seeking out mental health support in the future. Distrust of the medical system in America contributes to the reasons why Asian Americans first turn to their own cultural practices and healing methods to cure symptoms brought about by mental disorders prior to seeking professional assistance. This contributes to the seemingly low rates of mental health service utilization amongst Asian Americans.

== Mental well-being resources ==
=== "Let's Talk Conference" ===
The "Let's Talk Conference" was a one-day long event created by Harvard College students and alumni that brought together parents of Asian American high schoolers and Asian American students to educate them on the importance of utilizing mental health resources. Bringing together people under this demographic who could relate to one another's experiences was very effecting in countering stigma and driving home the importance of mental health care. This experience allowed Asian Americans to connect with mental health experts that also understood their culture. This type of a conference can be seen as a model for mental health resources that should be created and implemented for Asian Americans.

=== Mental health support hotline ===
The SAMHSA is both a free and confidential service that allows people to call in at any time that they need. This service is also free of charge, and therefore a person does not need insurance to use it.

=== Informal support ===
Asian Americans can also turn to friends and family to seek support during times of struggle with mental illness. This support circle can help connect those struggling with more formal resources if necessary. Friends and family who are understanding and offer their time can be a great support for those who are struggling. Asian Americans tend to turn to these types of support first before seeking professional assistance. Self-help and online resources are also available for utilization to improve mental health. Studies have shown that Asian Americans tend to favor these types of informal resources when seeking out mental health support over more formal resources. This conveys the critical role that families and friends play in supporting one another through mental health struggles.

== Methods to counter stigma ==
=== Cultural competency ===
Studies have conveyed that a key method to reduce rates of mental health disorders among Asian Americans is to make ensure access to mental health care that aligns with cultural values. Therapists and mental health specialists who undergo training to be more understanding of cultural considerations in relation to their patients are able to more effectively treat their Asian American patients. A study published in the Journal of Racial and Ethnic Health Disparities determined that in-access to Asian healthcare providers is another barriers to the utilization of mental health resources. Asian Americans are less likely to seek out mental health supports if healthcare providers that are available to them do not share their cultural background. In order to address mental health support seeking patterns amongst Asian Americans, supports must should be available that are reflective of Asian American identities.

Another aspect of cultural competency amongst healthcare providers is the integral nature that the family plays in Asian tradition. Studies have shown that if therapists and mental health specialists involve the entire family when caring for an Asian American patient, supports will yield more successful outcomes when it comes to healing from their mental health struggles. Mental health care in Western medicine tends to be more individualistic, focusing only on the patient themselves. However, because of the family oriented nature of Asian culture, culturally competent care should involve the whole family when catering to Asian Americans. This has been proven to have positive effects on the mental health of Asian Americans.

A final sector that healthcare providers should be aware of when addressing Asian American patients, is that they have been shown to report physical symptoms of mental health disorders instead of emotional ones. This makes it harder for healthcare providers to arrive at the correct diagnosis. This pattern of focusing on physical symptoms is due to a variety of cultural reasons that make people feel that physical complaints are more acceptable to seek help for than emotional ones. Recognizing this pattern that studies have found in the medical industry would help lead to a more culturally competent healthcare industry for Asian Americans, as would lead to more correct diagnosis.

== See also ==
- Health status of Asian Americans
- Race and health in the United States
- Mental health of Filipino Americans
- Health care in the United States
- Immigrant paradox: Mental health outcomes
