= Mental health of Filipino Americans =

The mental health of Filipino Americans is emotional and cognitive status of Americans of Filipino descent. Filipino-Americans utilize mental health services less than some Asian-American groups.

== Mental illness ==
=== Suicide ===
In a 2007 study by the Centers for Disease Control and Prevention, young Filipino women were more likely to have suicide ideation than most minorities. Paradoxically, however, there are lower rates of committing suicide among Filipinos than Caucasians or other Asian groups. Lower rates of suicide in Filipino-Americans are attributed to the influence of Catholicism in Filipino culture and the availability of social support from extended family.

=== Depression ===
Depending on other identity markers such as sexuality and age, certain Filipino-American groups are estimated to have more or less depression rates than their Chinese-Americans counterparts. In cases where Filipino-Americans report higher rates of depressive symptoms than other Asians, this could be because Chinese-Americans and other East Asian groups who experience depression are less likely to medically report their illness due to cultural stigma; further, these groups are more likely to seek non-Western treatment outside of hospitals, which further skews the statistics on their mental health reports.

According to the findings of a study by Napholz and Wenbin, Filipina-American working women who have an equal commitment to work and relationships report having less depression, higher self-esteem, higher life satisfaction, and lesser levels of role conflict than women who are committed to either work or relationships.

In a study in Cebu, Philippines, it found that the multigenerational living arrangements of Midlife Filipina women in relation to their family, affects their mental health. For example, living in a larger household reported a higher score of depressive symptoms in mid-life Filipina women, due to stress brought on by caregiving duties and loss of privacy and control. Co-residency of adult females with their older parents, affect their mental health based on the power dynamics and their role in the family. For example, the mental and physical health of a younger adult female in the family may suffer if she is at the bottom of the hierarchy, compared to that of an older adult female in the family who may have more power and respect. Having life transitions, such as losing a spouse, resulted in increasing depressive symptoms; and intergenerational co-residency, for example, transitioning from having grandchildren to no longer living with grandchildren, resulted in decreasing depressive symptoms.

Asian American and Pacific Islander immigrants are less likely, than any other minority group, to seek mental health care and treatment because of stigma attributed to shaming the family, self-reliance, and being reserved.

Support groups and religious networks are agencies that Filipina immigrants use to alleviate the stress of adapting in another country. Providing psychoeducation and having culturally competent mental health providers are what would be helpful in the context of mental health treatment, as well as more studies and research on Filipina's role commitment and interventions, are necessary.

== Causes ==
=== Colonialism ===
The after-effects of colonialism (American colonization of the Philippines from 1898 to 1946) still influence some Filipino-American immigrants. One large effect of American colonialism on Filipino-Americans' mental health is colonial mentality. Studies show that Asian Americans have more serious disorders and have more prolonged stays at mental institutions than Caucasians. Out of all Asian American groups, Filipino Americans have the highest rate of stays at mental institutions.

=== Immigration ===
Immigration is associated with mental illness in Filipinos. Filipino immigrants take part in fewer mental health services than other Americans. Filipino Americans were once immigrants. Filipinos are one of the largest groups of Asian-American immigrants. About 1.66 million Filipinos are immigrants. Some Filipino immigrants do not apply for programs such as Medicaid because they are worried that it would reduce their chances of becoming citizens. Filipino immigrants can also face racial discrimination, which is associated with depression and increased substance use.

Asian American immigrants are diagnosed with depression for various factors, such as not understanding English or inability to take health exams. The Filipino American Community Epidemiological Study (FACES) examined situations that may cause mental illness in Filipino immigrants. Employment worries increase stress, which can cause mental illness. Males who do not know English well enough are more prone to mental illness than English speakers. Female immigrants were more likely to have long-term disorders. Males are more susceptible to disorders that lead them to depend on alcohol and drugs.

=== Hiya ===
Hiya, a Tagalog word defined as "a sense of shame, loss of face, or embarrassment," plays a role in Filipino-Americans' use of mental health services. Hiya plays a negative role in Filipinos' ability to seek help from mental health professionals. The fear of bringing shame to oneself and the family can prevent Filipinos from seeking professional mental health aid. Hiya can also cause Filipinos to seek anonymous, online mental health help instead of in-person professional help.

== Models of Filipino-American identity and experience ==
Several models have been constructed to characterize the Filipino-American experience. These theories include the Identity Development Model, colonial mentality and the Model Minority Myth.

=== Identity development model ===
Filipino Americans experience racial and ethnic identity development in a different way, than other Asian American groups. The Philippines was colonized by Spain for over 300 years, and came to partially identify itself with Spain. However, Filipino Americans also identify with Asian and/or Pacific Islanders, leaving Filipino Americans with the possibility of multiple (or compound) racial and ethnic identities. The identity development model contains six stages that Filipino Americans may experience as they develop their identity. These stages include: ethnic awareness, assimilation to American culture, awareness of socio-political differences, Panethnic Asian American consciousness, ethnocentric realization and introspection or acceptance.

Ethnic awareness develops when an individual becomes aware of the culture associated with their ethnicity. This includes language, social activities, food, music and traditions. Typically this stage arrives during childhood. During the assimilation stage, the individual notices the differences between her ethnic culture and other cultures and assimilates with one or more such cultures. Typically this is some flavor of American culture. American values and traits are typically presented as preferable or even superior. For example, skin-whitening and bleaching products are promoted as a way to become more attractive.

During the "Awareness of Social/Political Differences" stage, Filipino Americans become actively aware of traits that separate them from other cultures, often sensitized by racial and cultural injustices. Differences can be interpreted positively (e.g., by coming to appreciate Filipino culture) or negatively (via experiencing racism).

The "Panethnic Asian-American Consciousness" stage occurs when individuals begin to associate with individuals of other Asian American groups and learn that such groups have much in common with them.

The "Ethnocentric Identity and Introspection" stage is the rejection of a broader Asian American identity and in favor or a specific Filipino identity.

The final Introspection stage is the acceptance of their other identities (e.g., as an Asian) without rejecting their Filipino heritage.

=== Colonial mentality ===
Colonial mentality is a form of internalized oppression in which an individual feels inferior because his heritage includes the experience of colonization. This mentality makes individuals feel the need to associate more towards American and/or Spanish values and traditions rather than their own, perceiving their colonizer to be superior.

Cultural identity crisis may also reinforce colonial mentality through Filipino-Americans experiencing confusion on what encompasses authentic Filipino identity and culture. This leads many Filipino-Americans to believe there is no truly authentic Filipino culture and that Filipinos are consequently inferior to Whiteness.

Colonial mentality has been shown to impact the psychological well-being of Filipino Americans. Those strongly affected are more likely to have low self-esteem and could develop symptoms of depression more often than others. Colonial mentality impacts self-esteem and weakens ethnic identity, which can negatively impact mental health. The four levels of impact on an individual: self-denigration, lack of appreciation of Filipino culture, discrimination against less-cultured individuals, and tolerance and acceptance of oppression by non-Filipinos.

=== Model minority ===
Model minority is a stereotypical assumption that members of a particular ethnic group excel in areas of behavior and education. Stereotypes that apply specifically to Filipino Americans include: low divorce rate, propensity to speak English better than other Asian Americans and lower poverty rate among Asian Americans. Stereotypes of Filipino Americans include academic and career success among women and young adults.

Model minority stereotypes pressure Filipino Americans to live up to their image. Students have been seen to question whether or not they are actually Asian if they are unable to match the stereotype. This affects the self-esteem of individuals.

== See also ==
- Health care in the United States
- Health of Filipino Americans
- Health status of Asian Americans
- Immigrant paradox: Mental health outcomes
- Mental health of Asian Americans
