= National Center for Mental Health =

Government hospital in Mandaluyong, Philippines

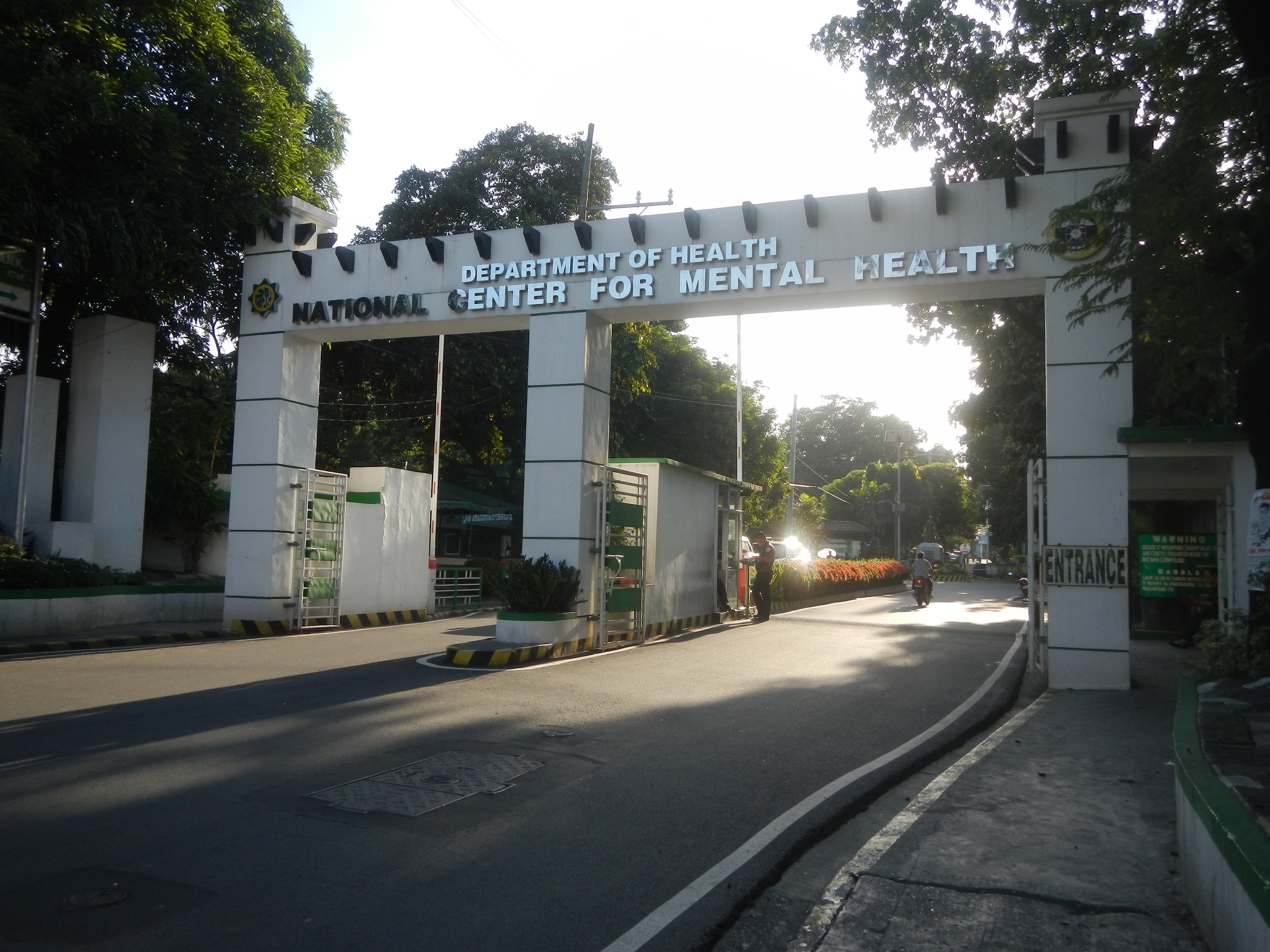

- Location within Metro Manila Location within Luzon Location within Philippines

Geography
- Location: 9 de Febrero St., Mauway, Mandaluyong, Metro Manila, Philippines
- Coordinates: 14°34′53″N 121°02′37″E

Services
- Emergency department: Yes

History
- Former names: Insular Psychopathic Hospital; Mandaluyong Mental Hospital; National Mental Hospital
- Opened: 17 December 1928; 97 years ago

Links
- Website: ncmh.gov.ph

The National Center for Mental Health (Filipino: Pambansang Sentro ng Pangkaisipang Kalusugan), is a 4,200-bed psychiatric hospital occupying 47 hectares of land in the city of Mandaluyong, Metro Manila, Philippines. It is PhilHealth-accredited.

Due to its size and prominence in Mandaluyong, it is common (though insensitive) for Mandaluyong residents to be asked jokingly whether they live "inside or outside" the facility when mentioning their city of residence.

== History ==
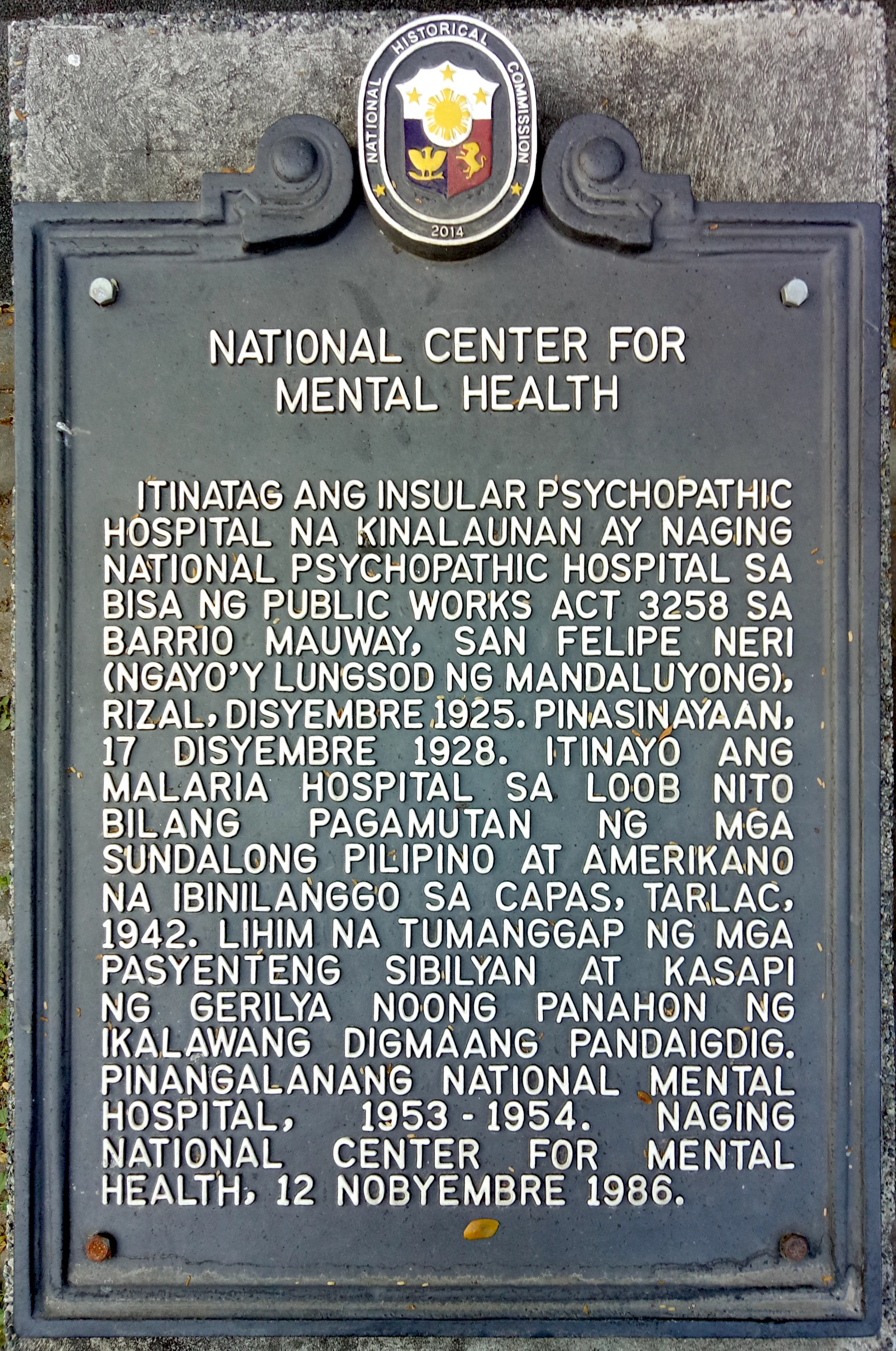
National historical marker installed in 2014

Initially called the Insular Psychopathic Hospital, and later the Mandaluyong Mental Hospital and the National Mental Hospital, was founded in 1925 and opened on 17 December 1928. It was founded in order to accommodate the increasing number of patients with mental disorders and related nervous system conditions who were primarily cared for at the “Insane Department” of San Lázaro Hospital and the City Sanitarium in the Philippines.

The insane asylum was built under Philippine Public Works Act No. 3258 on a 46-hectare (110-acre) location in Barrio Mauway, Mandaluyong, Rizal near the City of Manila. Patients from San Lázaro Hospital were transferred to the National Center for Mental Health in 1928. Patients from the City Sanitarium were transferred later in 1935. The present National Center for Mental Health is currently under the Department of Health.

With the increasing number of patients being admitted, the center has resorted to soliciting donations from the private sector.

=== Controversies ===
In February 2012, a 41-year-old male patient unexpectedly died while at the NCMH. The patient was confined in the hospital since 1998 due to paranoid schizophrenia attributed to drug abuse. An investigation was launched by the National Bureau of Investigation but the exact cause of death remains undetermined.

In May 2019, a 27-year-old and his grandmother were murdered by his grandfather while at the NCMH. The killer committed suicide after shooting the two.

== See also ==
- Mental health in the Philippines
- Psychiatric hospital
