= Special education in the Philippines =

Learning with disabilities program in the Philippines

Special education (SPED) in the Philippines, also referred to as special needs education (SNED) under Republic Act No. 11650, is an instructional program or service designed for learners with disabilities (LWDs). Its implementation is overseen by the Department of Education (DepEd), Department of Health (DOH), Department of Social Welfare and Development (DSWD), and other government agencies.

== History ==
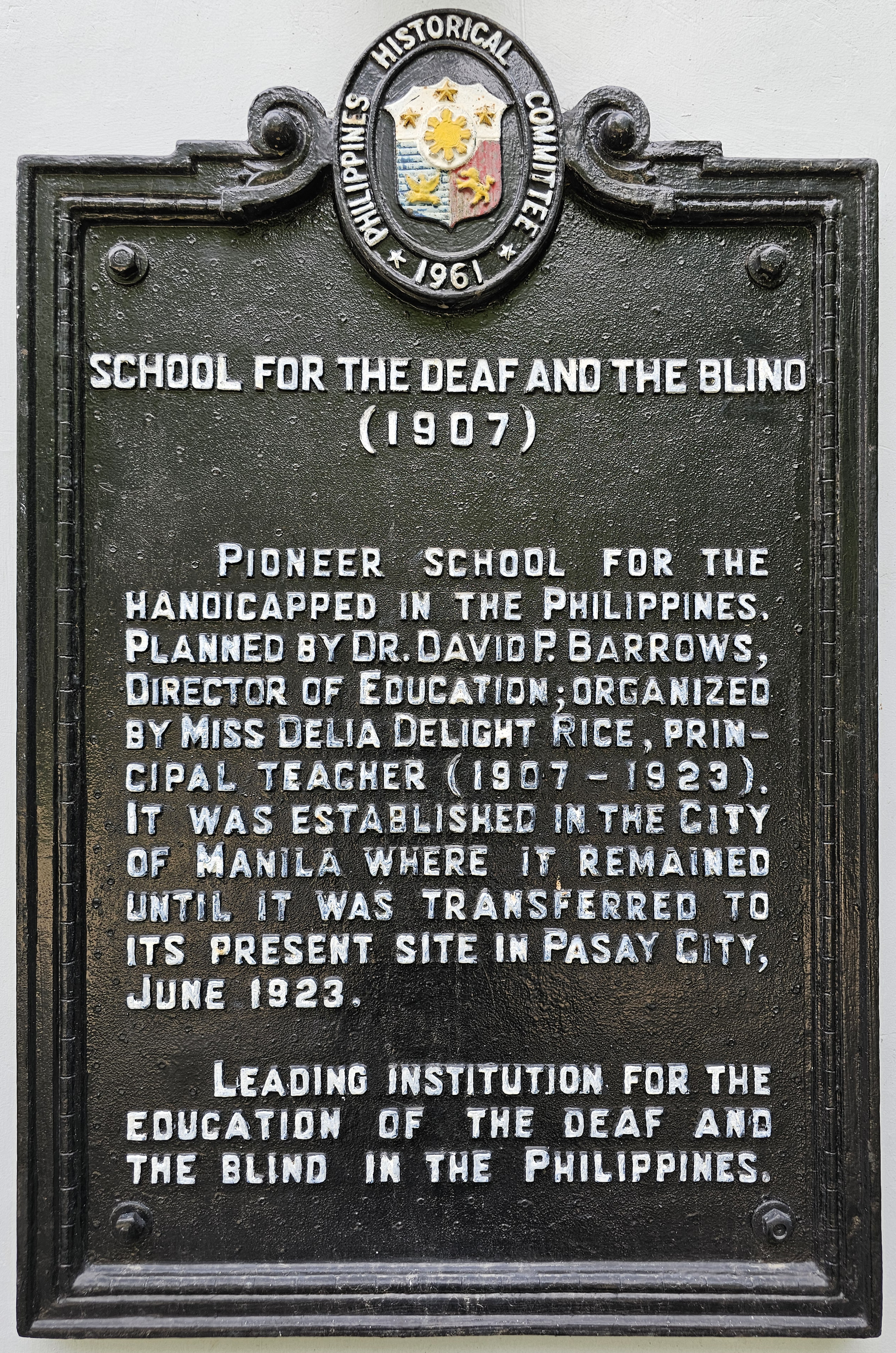
Historical marker

In 1907, the School for the Deaf and Blind was established in the Philippines.

In June 21, 1963, Republic Act No 3562 was approved to create the Philippine National School for the Blind. The School for the Deaf and Blind eventually became the Philippine School for the Deaf.

In 1983, Batas Pambansa Blg 344 or the “Accessibility Law” was signed into law.

On March 24, 1992, Republic Act No. 7277 or the "Magna Carta for Disabled Persons" was signed into law.

On October 18, 2018, Republic Act No. 11106 or the “Filipino Sign Language Act” was signed into law. The law declares the Filipino Sign Language as the national sign language of the country.

In 2021, the DepEd issued DepEd Order No. 45-2021 which provides for the initial conversion SPED Centers into prototype Inclusive Learning Resource Centers.

On March 11, 2022, Republic Act No. 11650 or the “Instituting a Policy of Inclusion and Services for Learners with Disabilities in Support of Inclusive Education Act” was signed into law. The Implementing Rules and Regulations (IRR) was signed in July 2024.

In January 2026, the Second Congressional Commission on Education (EDCOM 2) submitted the National Education Plan (2026-2035) which contains key goals which includes target rates for special needs education.

The Department of Education (DepEd) proposed in the budget for 2026 an allocation more than 1 billion pesos for its Special Needs Education program.

== Statistics ==
In a study cited by UNICEF in 2018, PhilHealth estimates that there are around 5,100,000 Children with Disabilities (CWD) in the Philippines.

For School Year 2024-2025 there are 391,089 identified learners with disabilities that are enrolled in public schools while other LWDs are either out-of-school or enrolled but have not undergone professional diagnosis.

In 2024 there are only 96 developmental and behavioral pediatrics experts in the Philippines. Even with the number of available positions in the Department of Education, there is a lack of experts and healthcare professionals such as developmental pediatricians to conduct assessments for learners with disabilities.

== Special education teachers ==
In 2025, the Department of Budget and Management approved teaching positions across all education stages and including that for special needs education (SNED) teachers.

On October 16, 2025, at the University of Santo Tomas (UST), the 2035 Teacher Education Roadmap was launched by the Teacher Education Council (TEC) which will be used to address the needs of teachers which includes special education and inclusive education.

== School enrollment ==
To increase the enrollment of children with disabilities in public schools, the Child Find System (CFS) was established through Republic Act No. 11650 to identify children with disabilities ages twenty four and below that are not included in basic education. Prior to the enactment of the law, the Department of Education issued DepEd Order No. 23, s. 2022 or the Child Find Policy for Learners with Disabilities Towards Inclusive Education on May 25, 2022.

== Inclusive learning resource centers ==
Republic Act No. 11650 requires that the Department of Education, with the local government units (LGUs), to create one ILRC in each city and municipality.

In 2024, the ILRC in the Cagayan Valley Region was opened in the Province of Quirino.

In the Province of Isabela, the Municipality of Cabagan constructed an Inclusive Learning Resource Center (ILRC) funded through the FY Seal of Good Local Governance Incentive Fund (SGLGIF) from the Department of Interior and Local Government (DILG).

== Technical vocational education and training ==
In 2017, the Technical Education and Skills Development Authority (TESDA) and National Council on Disability Affairs (NCDA) signed a Memorandum of Agreement to provide skill training for persons with disabilities for free.

In 2019, the Bacolod City in partnership with the DSWD, opened the Vocational Sheltered Workshop Center for Persons with Disability.

== Protection of learners with disability ==
Local Government Units such as in Isabela, Basilan initiates Anti-Bullying Awareness Campaign.

The DSWD and Laoag City signed a Memorandum of Agreement (MOA) for the launching of Project Aruga for the early detection of Children with Disabilities (CWDs) and to provide for the needs of the children and their caregivers.

In a hearing conducted by the Senate of the Philippines in 2023, the data presented on school bullying does not disaggregate data for Learners with Disabilities (LWDs). The lack of data was commented by the Autism Society Philippines. There is a need to improve data collection in bullying incidents to respond to the needs of LWDs.

== See also ==
- Disability in the Philippines
- Special education in the United States
