= Philippine Children's Fund of America =

Organization based in San Francisco, California

The Philippine Children's Fund of America (PCFA) is a non-profit organization registered with the state of California and is duly recognized by the United States Federal Government. It is based in San Francisco, California, with a Philippine office in Clark Field, Angeles City. Philippine Children's Fund of America is the most widely supported Filipino-American non-profit organization in the United States.

== History ==
PCFA was created by the US and Philippine governments in 1991 to assist impoverished Filipino children of American ancestry by providing educational scholarships, employment and working visas to the United States. PCFA envisions a stable and viable community that will uphold the rights, welfare, and aspiration of Filipino families especially the children towards authentic human development. PCFA was founded to serve the needs of children left behind by the U.S. military closure. the Pearl S. Buck International foundation estimates there are 52,000 Amerasian scattered throughout the Philippines. "The majority of the children have been abandoned by their American fathers," said Jocelyn Bonilla, the manager of the Pearl S. Buck center in Angeles. Today, it is serving more children, families and communities including 150 charitable groups all over the Philippines.

== Projects ==
=== The Child Sponsorship Program (CSP) ===
The program was designed to provide educational assistance to poor but deserving children. By providing the poor access to education, the chances of improving the Filipino family's very unfavorable condition caused by extreme poverty could be strengthened. Children can now enjoy their right to education, families will be more empowered, hence, better lives and stronger communities.

=== Amerasian Program ===
The Amerasian Program aims to help Amerasian children (children of a U.S. military father and an Asian mother) with or without US citizenship. For Amerasian children with USA citizenship, the PCFA provides free travel, internship and lodging in the USA. They also help Amerasian children trace and reunite with their fathers. For children without documentation, PCGA provides educational, psychosocial and livelihood assistance.

=== The Community Fund Drive (CFD) ===
It is a program designed to help Non-Government Agencies in the Philippines raise their own funds so that they will be able to push for quality development programs and services for the needy Filipino community. It is conceived to be an effective fundraising activity that will not require the participating agencies to invest any capital or resources in risky fund sourcing ventures.

=== Tulong Para sa Batang Filipino Coin Jar Project ===
A fundraising program of the Philippine Children's Fund of America designed to provide funding on different programs of the organization.

=== The Angeles City Children's Library (ACCL) ===
The ACCL is a joint project of the Philippine Children's Fund (PCF) and the Angeles government. Along Sto. Entierro St. at the City Library and Information Center, the ACCL is an interactive library which houses a wide selection of books, toys and other learning materials that the kids enjoy.

== Motto ==
"Build Better Lives and Stronger Communities".

== Offices ==
Head office is based in San Francisco, California. They have a Philippine office in Clark Field, Angeles City.

== See also ==
- Amerasian
