= Health status of Asian Americans =

Asian Americans have historically been perceived as a "model minority", experiencing few health problems relative to other minority groups. Research within the past 20 years, however, has shown that Asian Americans are at high risk for hepatitis B, liver cancer, tuberculosis, and lung cancer, among other conditions. Asian American health disparities have gained focus only in the past 10 years, with policy initiatives geared towards promoting healthcare access to Asian Americans rising to prominence even later. Asian Americans are defined as Americans of Asian ancestry and constitute nearly 5% of American's population as of 2003, according to the U.S. Census Bureau. Yet, the Asian American population can hardly be described as homogenous. The term applies to members of over 25 groups that have been classified as a single group because of similar appearances, cultural values, and common ethnic backgrounds. The Asian Americans commonly studied have been limited primarily to individuals of Cambodian, Chinese, Filipino, Hmong, Japanese, Korean, Lao, Mien, or Vietnamese descent.

== Health disparities ==
Asian Americans are a heterogeneous group. The racial class is composed of many different ethnicities and cultures. In addition to country of origin, individuals can differ in socioeconomic status, education level, immigration status, level of acculturation, and English proficiency. In general, ethnic groups have their own health disparities. Vietnamese and Filipino Americans tend to have poorer health outcomes compared with Chinese, Japanese, and Korean Americans. Self-rated health was lowest in Vietnamese Americans, while Filipino Americans have the highest rates of chronic diseases, including asthma, high blood pressure, and heart disease. Filipinos are also an ethnic group that is a risk factor for premature births and amyotrophic lateral sclerosis (ALS or "Lou Gehrig's disease"). Koreans exhibit the highest psychological stress out of all ethnic groups. Thus, to classify and generalize health disparities to such a heterogeneous group may not be beneficial; however, a few health statistics can still be gleaned from general trends. Genetic inherited disorders and diseases (e.g. colorblindness, hemophilia) were reported to be uncommon in all Asian ethnic groups.

=== Cardiovascular disease ===
Cardiovascular disease is one of the leading killers in all ethnic groups and a major contributor to disability among older adults. The incidence of heart disease is known to increase with age and the majority of deaths from coronary artery disease occur in people ages 65 years and older. While the rates of death from cardiovascular disease are lower for Asian Americans relative to other ethnic groups, they are still diagnosed with hypertension and heart disease. Cardiovascular disease and associated risk factors among Asian Americans and Pacific Islanders are high blood cholesterol, high blood pressure, cigarette smoking, obesity, and diabetes mellitus. According to American Heart Association in 2016, around 19.5% of Asian Americans have high blood pressure. In 2013, 18,819 deaths among Asians and Pacific Islanders were from cardiovascular disease, 8,477 from chronic heart disease, and 2,616 from myocardial infarction. Cancer, the second leading cause of death, contributed to 21.3% in 2017. The prevalence of coronary heart disease among Asian Americans is estimated to be around 4.9%.

Cardiovascular disease remains the leading cause of death for all Americans, and continues to disproportionally affect the Asian Americans who are disadvantageous in society because of various social determinants. The social determinants leading to health disparity include lack of language proficiency, health illiteracy from lower education attainment, racial discrimination, economic instability and poor community engagement. According to the National Institute on Minority Health and Health Disparity (NIMHD) sponsored lecture "Health Disparity Research in Diverse Asian American Populations in 2016", 70% of foreign-born Asian Americans were identified as having limited English proficiency, dissimilar cultural beliefs and behaviors, as well as unfamiliarity with the Western health care system and difficulty following instructions at the doctor's office. Addressing the health disparities requires significant awareness, comprehension, and consideration for the growing diversity of Asian population, especially for the foreign-born older Asian Americans. Understanding the impact of social determinants on health equity is crucial to health care professionals and policy makers to reduce health disparities and improve the health equality among Asian Americans and the underserved populations.

=== Diabetes ===
With the adaptation of American culture, immigrant populations can be seen to have increased risks of diseases as Western diets are being introduced into their daily food consumption. However, there is a heightened risk of type 2 diabetes amongst Asian Americans as its presence makes up 21% of the Asian American population, twice as high as non-Hispanic whites. Various genetic and environmental factors cause Asian Americans to be more likely to develop type 2 diabetes than other racial and ethnic groups even though their body mass index (BMI) tends to be lower. Asian Americans have a higher percentage of body fat for their BMIs, which in turn elevates the risk of type 2 diabetes when BMIs are lowered; they in fact may have a higher percentage of body fat which contributes to a greater risk of developing diabetes and other health concerns that are commonly overseen. Because of their BMIs, which are usually lower than other racial and ethnic groups, there is a common misconception that they are not at much of a risk for developing type 2 diabetes. The World Health Organization, however, has suggested a lower BMI cutoff point in order to properly diagnose obesity for Asian Americans because of such low BMI levels.

Though it is expected that as there is a higher risk of type 2 diabetes within the Asian American population that much research is being done to screen for diabetes efficiently, the rate of not diagnosing type 2 diabetes for Asian Americans is three times as high as non-Hispanic whites. More than one in three people with diabetes are undiagnosed from improper screening, and that is particularly high for Asian Americans and Hispanics. A possible reason for why this may be the case is because Asian Americans are not aware of their elevated risk of developing type 2 diabetes and therefore refrain from screenings. Having no access to health insurance or lack of use of health care from language barriers as Asian immigrants may also contribute to the lack of screenings and increased likelihoods of undiagnosed type two diabetes. Research on language barriers showed differences in diagnoses of diabetes for Asian Americans and Hispanics particularly compared to whites in America as clinicians are lacking physician-patient communication. Another possibility is that the existence of the "model minority myth" prevents physicians from recognizing that such an elevated risk exists in Asian Americans, along with other common health issues. Based on these possibilities, Chinese and Korean Americans are also less likely than other Asian American subgroups to take part in self-management practices for their diabetes while Asian Americans as a whole are not given the physician-led management resources to treat diabetes like other racial groups.

In 2015, the American Diabetes Association (ADA) changed its guidelines for testing for diabetes for all Asian American adults who have a BMI of at least 23, instead of 25, which launched campaigns like "Screen at 23". Older Asian Americans have increased odds of diabetes or hypertension that still needs to be addressed.

=== Hepatitis B ===
Hepatitis B is especially prevalent amongst Asian Americans. A study conducted between 2001 and 2006 that provided hepatitis B virus screenings to 3163 Asian Americans found that 8.9% of the population was chronically infected. Notably, 65.4% of those who were infected were unaware of their condition. Men were more likely to be infected than women, and hepatitis B infections were 19.4 times more likely in foreign born Asian Americans than in those born in the United States. Hepatitis B is one of the leading causes of the development of cirrhosis and hepatocellular carcinoma (HCC). Cirrhosis and liver cancer are often interconnected, and having cirrhosis may heighten the risk in development of liver cancer. Additionally, incidences of liver cancer amongst Asian Americans are 2 to 11 times higher than that of White Americans, depending on gender and ethnic group.

=== Cancer ===
For Asian Americans, the leading cause of death is cancer, a factor unique to their racial/ethnic group. For every other racial/ethnic category, heart disease is the leading cause of death. Asian Americans exhibit the highest rates of cancers of the liver, cervix, and stomach. Additionally, Asian Americans have the highest rate of cancer for age categories 25–44 and 45–64, while it is just 45–64 for White people.

The cancer burden that affects Asian Americans is unusual because of the nature of the cancers. Those with higher rates in Asian American populations are of infectious origin, such as human papillomavirus leading to cervical cancer, hepatitis B virus leading to liver cancer, and Helicobacter pylori-induced stomach cancer. As more and more Asians immigrate to the United States, they adapt American customs, a phenomenon known as acculturation. The transition in lifestyles is associated with cancers attributed to dietary changes and sedentary living. There is an increase in colon and rectal cancer in Asian Americans from dietary changes. That may be attributed to the increase in consumption of red meat, which is consumed less in Asia than in America. That manifests itself in the Asian American population in the San Francisco Bay area, where colorectal cancer rates are higher than in mainland China.

Additionally, Asians born and raised in the United States experience a greater risk of getting breast cancer. Asian American women who reside in the United States for more than 10 years have an 80% greater risk for breast cancer compared with more recent immigrants from Asia. Breast cancer is not the only cancer where this can be seen.

Overall, Asian and Pacific Islander men and women had lower rates of HPV-associated cancers than White men and women.

High rates of smoking also contribute to high rates of lung cancer. Lung cancer rates for Southeast Asians are 18 percent higher than for White Americans. 28.9% of all Asian Americans smoked at one point in their lives. Current rates of smoking stand at 14.8%. Smokers are more likely males (22.6%) than females (7.3%). However, high smoking prevalence is concentrated around certain areas. For example, Vietnamese men in Franklin County, Ohio, were found to have a smoking rate of 43.4%.

Asian Americans, between all racial/ethnic groups in the United States are the only group with the leading cause of death being cancer.

Another contributor to the high rates of cancer in the Asian American community are disparities stemming from cultural differences and the health care system. Language barriers can prevent individuals from thoroughly understanding medical information like risks, screening, and possible solutions. There also continues to be a lack of access to medical interpreters and lack of extended help to individuals whose first language is not English. Many Asian American cultures have negative stigmas associated with diagnosis and medical care. These stigmas and emotions include feelings of alienation if diagnosed, negative stigmas about Western medicine, poor experiences with American health care, and possible medical practices that go against cultural or religious beliefs. Additionally, it is commonly believed that cancer screening and treatment only occurs with the onset of symptoms. Alongside these cultural barriers, Asian Americans also face disparities in the health care system. Many are faced with lack of insurance, primary care, resources for non-English speaking individuals, minimal outreach to their communities, and lack of accessibility to quality health care. With being faced with both cultural and systematic barriers, individuals often are faced with experiences that deter them from future medical care.

=== Mental health ===
The number of epidemiological and population-based studies focused on Asian American mental health is limited. Mental health problems can be measured using symptom scales rather than Diagnostic and Statistical Manual of Mental Disorders (DSM) criteria, which requires both symptoms and intensity and duration of symptoms for a more accurate diagnosis. Considerable evidence from studies that use varying methodologies have found that immigrant Asians and Asian Americans experience significantly high levels of distress that are consistent with depression, posttraumatic stress disorder (PTSD), and anxiety. There have been two main large-scale studies of mental health: the National Comorbidity Study (NCS) and the Epidemiological Catchment Area (ECA) study. Both investigated the prevalence of DSM-III and DSM-IIIR mental disorders among Asian Americans and found that there was a low prevalence in psychiatric disorders compared to European Americans. However, these studies only sampled English-speaking Asian Americans and did not have large sample sizes, so they are not necessarily representative of the Asian American population. The Chinese American Psychiatric Epidemiological Study (CAPES) was the first large-scale study to examine the incidence of DSM-IIIR psychiatric disorders among primarily Chinese American immigrants. It found that 6.9% of the participants reported having major depression during their lifetime, compared with the 17.1% prevalence in Americans in the NCS study and 4.9% in the ECA study. The lack of accurate data on the mental health of Asians contributes to unjust health policy. Lawmakers need to expand the collection and publication of disaggregated health data on various Asian communities to provide systematic changes to mental health access.

The statistics on mental disorders in Asian American populations may be lower than the actual incidence. Mental illness is highly stigmatized in many Asian cultures, so symptoms are likely underreported. Asian Americans thus express more somatic symptoms than their European American counterparts when under mental or emotional distress. An example of this is hwabyeong or "suppressed anger syndrome" in Korean culture. This is considered a culture-bound syndrome, as it is only manifested in Korean populations. The syndrome describes a range of psychosomatic symptoms including headache, anxiety, insomnia, heat sensation, and indigestion that arises from familial stressors like infidelity, in-law conflict, and oppressive patriarchal family structure. An inability to express frustrations fromj cultural expectations of family harmony leads to a buildup of emotions and the resulting psychosomatic symptoms. Because of this kind of cultural variation in mental disorders and expression of symptoms, lack of health care access, and an underutilization of mental health resources, researchers have difficulty obtaining accurate statistics about Asian American mental health. Various organizations are providing more visibility and encouragement of utilizing mental health resources. One entity, called the Asian Mental Health Collective, aims to normalize and de-stigmatize mental health within the Asian community. It provides resources and a directory of Asian therapists in the U.S., of which 220 out of a total of 587 speak an Asian language. With over dozens of Asian languages, there needs to be more access to non-English-speaking mental health providers. Asians and Asian Americans are not monoliths.

Some of the key factors that affect mental health in Asian Americans include acculturation, language barriers among parents and children, and intergenerational conflict. Acculturation describes the physical and psychological changes that occur when two cultures meet and encompasses the changes that occur when immigrants and refugees assimilate into a new culture. Immigration to a country with a vastly different culture can be considered a stressful life event that leads to culture shock, migration shock, and acculturative stress. Frequently diagnosed disorders in recent immigrants include depression, PTSD, anxiety, and schizophrenia, though the rate of incidence of mental health problems decreases with increased assimilation and time in a new country. Refugees from Southeast Asian countries like Cambodia and Laos also experience high rates of PTSD from war traumas and resettlement stressors. Varying English proficiency among immigrant Asian parents can be a source of conflict between parents and children. One study shows that in immigrant Chinese families, the level of English proficiency in the parental generation correlates with indicators of child and adolescent psychological well-being. Another factor that contributes to intergenerational conflict is differing cultural values between the host society and the parents. This serves as a source of stress and psychological duress for American adolescents, as they are socialized into the host culture while still expected to maintain their parents' heritage.

==== Among older adult Asian Americans ====
In 2003, the Asian American Federation of New York presented a research study in which demonstrated that there are health disparities in mental health problems among older Asian Americans. The study found that the suicide rate among Asian Americans 65 years and older is double that of other older ethnic groups. Additionally, the estimated rate among older Asian Americans in the US in 2018 is 4.5% of 65 years and over. Asian Americans are experiencing higher rates of depression compared with the general elderly population in the US, and one of the leading causes of death in the US for older Asian Americans is suicide. The study also found that having depressive symptoms among older Asian Americans (or their mental health) is significantly associated with their general physical health, physical and social functioning and vitality. The study recommends meeting older Asian Americans' needs of culturally and linguistically proper social services and mental health agencies.

=== Drug use ===
Asian Americans generally have low rates of substance use, but contain disparities when disaggregated into ethnic groups, gender, and the type of drug used. Compared to other ethnic groups, research finds that Japanese and mixed-race Asian Americans have increased likelihoods of drug consumption, and prescription drug abuse risk is high for Filipino Americans. Gender provides a variation in risk as well. Chinese and Vietnamese females, compared to their male counterparts, have higher probability of alcohol addiction. Asian American college-aged women who have depression are found to have positive correlation with drug and alcohol consumption. Although Asian American youth substance abuse rates have increased over the years, there has not been much research conducted on that.

=== Self-esteem ===
Self-esteem, consisting of self-evaluations and judgments of one's value or self-worth, plays a significant part in Asian Americans' psychological well-being. A number of studies have revealed that Asian Americans are suffering from lower self-esteem and higher levels of depression relative to other racial/ethnic groups. The problem of low self-esteem is most prevalent among first generation-immigrants and the U.S.-born Asian Americans with immigrant parents.

Low self-esteem can lead to a number of negative outcomes. For example, Zhou and Bankston's (2002) research on the connection between the academic performance and self-esteem of Asian American students indicates that self-esteem is negatively linked with level of stress and angst, such that the lower their self-esteem, the higher their reported levels of stress and angst. The study also found that Asian American students are more prone to depression, insecurity, and fear of failure.

Many factors contribute to the low self-esteem of Asian Americans. One such factor is the collective cultural identity derived from fundamental Asian cultures such as Confucianism. The collective culture in Asian society underscores one's membership in social groups in contrast to the individualist culture commonly found in the United States, which stresses a person's uniqueness and independence. Asian Americans tend to build their self-esteem based on other people's evaluations and attitudes of themselves instead of their personal achievements and self-evaluations. Another influencing factor comes from the family. Compared with white parents, Asian American parents have more control and authority over their children and offer less encouragement to their children, which plays a role in the low self-esteem of many Asian American students. The influence of authoritative parenting is more notable in immigrant Asian American families. For example, many immigrant parents have high expectation for their children and try to build their place and identity in a new environment through the achievement of their children. That parental pressure results in not only higher academic performance but also greater stress and lower self-esteem.

Additionally, apart from the historical racial incidents including anti-Asian movements and anti-immigration legislation, Asian Americans are also victims of racism in the United States. According to the Annual Audit of Violence Against Asian Pacific Americans conducted by the NAPALC in 2003, Asian Americans are one of the targeted groups of "racially motivated harassment, vandalism, theft, physical assault, and in some cases, homicide." Moreover, the discrimination in daily life are significantly injuring Asian Americans' well-being, both physically and mentally. In the face of racially motivated incidents, students are reported to have "feelings of helplessness, depression, psychosomatic symptoms, and a loss of face". However, it is reported that Asian Americans' own perception of racism against them is limited, and the problem and needs that are caused by racism are often neglected by society since they are masked by stereotypes such as "model minority" and "honorary whites." It has been reported that self-esteem is positively related to people's ethnic identity and the extent to which they explore their ethnic identity. Research conducted by Umaña-Taylor and Fine in 2002 shows that self-cognition from effective self-exploring and the attempt to build racial perception and ethnic identity is conductive to enhancing the self-esteem of minority population including Asian Americans.

=== Other ===
Asian Americans have a higher prevalence of tuberculosis compared with all other ethnic groups, at 22.4 per 100,000 individuals. Pacific Islanders stand at 20.8 cases per 100,000 individuals. According to the Centers for Disease Control and Prevention, the average tuberculosis rate is 3.9 cases per 100,000 individuals. The rate for foreign-born persons was around 11 times higher than among U.S.-born persons. While these statistics have been falling, tuberculosis is still a major health discrepancy issue among Asian Americans.

Asian Americans also have a greater vulnerability to certain refractive errors, like myopia.

Asian American women are at higher risk for getting osteoporosis, because of lower bone mass and smaller body frames. Lower calcium intake amplifies this risk. As many as 90% of Asian Americans are lactose intolerant, or have trouble digesting dairy products. Furthermore, less time spent outdoors means less vitamin D production, which translates to less calcium absorption. In many Asian cultures, people feel that women with lighter skin tones are more attractive. Those factors are further compounded by inadequate knowledge about osteoporosis and calcium consumption among Asian women.

== Barriers to health care access ==
At first glance, Asian Americans are far from being classified as a vulnerable population. That error has been perpetuated by many reports that classified Asian Americans as a single body, rather than as differentiated groups. As immigrants, Asian Americans are subject to barriers to accessing health care. Out of all barriers, financial, cultural, communication, and physical were the most often reported. Financial barriers exist through the lack of health insurance. Most Asian Americans receive their health insurance through work. Koreans are most likely to be uninsured, given their self-employment status. Because of the lack of health insurance, many of the most vulnerable individuals do not go for regular checkups, and do not have a regular primary care provider. Furthermore, out-of-pocket payments for care are relatively high compared with immigrant's homeland, leading to a reluctance to pay.

Asian Americans tend to avoid visiting the hospital unless absolutely necessary amd so many infections remain unnoticed until they develop serious symptoms, and by then, the infection may have led to cancer. Of all the racial/ ethnic groups, Asian Americans are the least likely to have visited a physician within the past 12 months. Without routine checkups and the prompting of their physicians, Asian Americans are unlikely to receive their regular round of vaccinations, mammograms, and screenings. Asian American women over the age of 40 are the least likely racial/ethnic group to receive mammograms, and those who are diagnosed have more advanced stages of cancer compared to Caucasian women diagnosed. Many of these cancer burdens on the Asian American population are unnecessary and preventable with increased screening and vaccinations, especially because many cancers associated with this category are of infectious origin.

Many Asian Americans also face physical barriers to health care access. Lack of transportation prevents many individuals from seeking out health care that may be further away from their residence.

Furthermore, there appears to be an additional language barrier, with those that have limited English proficiency reporting even fewer mammograms than Asian Americans who are proficient at English. The proportion of Asian Americans obtaining screening tests for cervical cancer remains the lowest out of all the racial/ethnic groups as well, and again, language plays a role. Another unnecessary cancer risk is the failure to be vaccinated against hepatitis B viral infections to prevent liver cancer. Only 28.5% of Asian American youths are reported to have had a vaccination for hepatitis B versus the 73.4% among California's seventh-graders. Asian Americans have a similar incidence of mental disorders as European Americans but are three times less likely to use mental health services. When Asian Americans do seek treatment, their symptoms are likely to be more severe and chronic when compared to European Americans. This is a result of initiating treatment at a later time and ending treatments prematurely. The underuse of mental health services is partially caused by the cultural stigma attached to mental illness, as well as a lack of bilingual and culturally sensitive physicians. Over two thirds of Asian Americans are immigrants, with one third of the total population possessing limited English proficiency. Immigrants and non-English speakers are especially vulnerable for low health literacy. Many Asian Americans are uncomfortable with communicating with their physician, leading to a gap in healthcare access and reporting. Even persons comfortable with using English may have trouble identifying or describing different symptoms, medications, or diseases. Cultural barriers also prevent proper health care access. Many Asian Americans visit the doctor only if there are visible symptoms. In other words, preventive care is not a cultural norm. Also, Asian Americans were more likely than white respondents to say that their doctor did not understand their background and values. White respondents were more likely to agree that doctors listened to everything that they had to say, compared to Asian American patients. Lastly, many beliefs bar access to proper medical care. For example, many believe that blood is not replenished, and are therefore reluctant to have their blood drawn.

=== Substance abuse treatment ===
There is a rather low representation of Asian Americans as clients in the mental health system, particularly in substance abuse treatment. Many Asian Americans are first-time clients at substance abuse treatment facilities. More Asian Americans are presenting treatment for the first time than they have since the last 10 years. This has led to an increase in the number of Asian Americans seeking enrollment for treatment. The AAPIs that do enroll are contributing to a larger healthcare disparity between those that say they need the treatment versus those who are present at the treatment. According to American Psychological Association, Asian Americans regard familial and social circles as their main support for life problems and view institutions as the last option for support. As a result, treatment facilities may be accustomed to needs of the majority of non-Asian clients that take part in the programs. Considering the abundance of ethnic groups under Asian American population, lack of exposure to Asian American clients can be problematic as the system may not be culturally aware of or empathetic towards this diverse population's needs.

=== Relationship with drugs ===
Exploring the relationship Asian Americans have with drugs may help with understanding how to prevent and potentially redefine warning signs for drug abuse in this community. In more recent years, there has been attempts to explore the Asian American perceptions on drugs. Reasons for why people use substances vary depending on the ethnic subgroup and many other factors. Although research on this topic is limited, a study was done at music festival scenes where Asian Americans reported using drugs as means to express their identities or lifestyle tastes. In terms of alcohol misuse, cultural identity struggles, language barriers, and acculturation may correlate with likelihood of alcohol misuse as a means of coping. Each ethnic subgroup has unique life circumstances that impact how Asian Americans make decisions relating to drug use.

== Improving health and healthcare delivery ==
=== Policy approaches ===
Up to the 1990s, there was very little research into Asian American health. Until 2003, the 23 federal health surveys available aggregated data under the label Asian or Pacific Islander, making data essentially useless. Between 1986 and 2000, only 0.2% of federal grants were directed towards Asian American health and research.

With warnings coming in from researchers, the Asian American and Pacific Islander community worked to establish institutions for Asian American and Pacific Islander health research. New York University School of Medicine established the Center for the Study of Asian American Health in 2003 in response. The National Cancer Institute funded the Asian American Network for Cancer Awareness, Research, and Tobacco at University of California Davis in 2005. Asian American and Pacific Islander health initiatives were funded by the US Department of Health and Human Services through institutions such as the National Institutes of Health, Centers for Disease Control and Prevention, and the Office of Minority Health.

The federal government has also begun reporting Asian American census data in separate ethnic groups. The US Census Bureau collects data on 25 Asian and 23 Pacific Islander subgroups. However, many of the NIH's surveys are erratic in their labeling of ethnic groups of Asian Americans, with some having different number of ethnic groups. Both Presidents Bill Clinton and George W. Bush have signed executive orders to establish the President's Advisory Commission on Asian American Pacific Islanders. The committee, in 2003, advised the creation of a national plan for the improvement of health in Asian and Pacific Islander communities. Policy measures that specifically target Asian Americans, however, are yet to be seen on the federal level. Uehara et al. (1994), as well as others, argues that treating Asian Americans as a single category can lead to inaccurate conclusions, but others argue that this homogenization is necessary in this neoliberal state, and it is just not feasible to evaluate data and provide specific healthcare to every single Asian minority.

=== Grassroots movements ===
With the lack of policy initiatives from the government, Asian Americans have increasingly taken to grassroots movements to improve their health status.

Because of insurance, costs, and a variety of other reasons, the types of services needed to meet the needs of Asian minority communities are not usually offered at private hospitals. Federally qualified health centers (FQHCs) are legally mandated to provide primary care for medically underserved communities, and thus are ideal settings to implement and provide culturally and linguistically inclusive services to Asian immigrant communities. Asian activists and organizations were influenced by the Black Panther Party's work, especially surrounding community healthcare services and advocacy for underserved populations in Oakland and within the area during times of civil unrest and movements such as Civil Rights, Yellow Power, United Farm Workers Movement, Third World Liberation Front, etc. Movements such as these, as well as "the War on Poverty programs … incentivized non-black minority community organizers to form panethnic [community service organizations] to gain access to state resources and serve the economically disadvantaged in their communities." These civil rights movements were an inspiration for subsequent social justice movements. In response to an increasingly neoliberal and multicultural state that saw race as a neutral cultural concept, with the government lumping all Asian identities together in official censuses and data, "in the late 1960s, Asian American college and community activists of diverse racial backgrounds rallied around a deliberately political and strategic panethnic "Asian American" identity that was grounded in a radical political consciousness." Asian Americans included Koreans, Chinese, Japanese, Pacific Islander, etc. The "state concessions (funding) to minority demands offered eager second- and third-generation Asian American activists new opportunities to establish community-based organizations to serve the people", and inspired by the civil rights movements and resulting ethnic power movements, these activists "sought to channel these new state funds into social service programs for child care, youth, affordable senior citizen housing, and health care."

Some of these activists founded Asian Health Services, a Community Health Center that strives to provide affordable, accessible healthcare to immigrant (mostly Asian) communities in the Oakland area. Asian Health Services focuses its work largely on serving those who are historically marginalized (communities of color, non-English speaking, immigrants/refugees, etc.).

Photographer Corky Lee created a healthcare fair in New York's Chinatown in 1971 that provided free services for conditions like tuberculosis testing, sexually transmitted infections, and lead poisoning. He was inspired by social service programs created by the Black Panthers.

The Asian & Pacific Islander American Health Forum (APIAHF), established in 1986, has worked to influence policy and mobilize individuals to improve Asian and Pacific Islander health. Among its many activities, APIAHF has a history of filing briefs of amicus curiae in support of various court cases. Its most recent filing is a historic amicus brief in support of the Affordable Care Act (ACA) in February 2012 to the Supreme Court for the case Florida v. United States Department of Health and Human Services. On behalf of 39 organizations dedicated to improving the health of Asian and Pacific Islander communities, the APIAHF brief details the needs of the Asian American community.

==== Community-based participatory research ====
To address the deficiencies in Asian American healthcare delivery, national organizations such as the Asian and Pacific Islander American Health Forum (APIAHF) and the Association of Asian Pacific Community Health Organizations (AAPCHO) have taken on community-based participatory research initiatives by connecting with local community partners to increase research and knowledge about historically underrepresented populations. Both of these organizations were originally formed to address the lack of Asian American voices on issues that affect the health of their communities. AAPCHO and APIAHF work with community health centers in the United States to research and develop data on their patients. By working with organizations within the Asian American community, larger organizations have more data on the communities they aim to serve and are therefore better equipped to created informed policy and provide knowledgeable care.

To better support Asian American health, studies have been done to establish best practices for community-based participatory research. One organization engaging in that research is the Center for the Study of Asian American Health (CSAAH), which follows three principles: "(1) creating and sustaining multiple partnerships; (2) promoting equity in partnerships; and (3) commitment to action as well as research." Some strategies that CSAAH deployed included working with both health and non-health organizations to address the fact that many Asian Americans seek medical information from non-health centers. They have also worked with organizations that represented specific Asian ethnic groups, making an effort to better understand the diversity within a historically homogenized group.

=== Peer-to-peer education ===
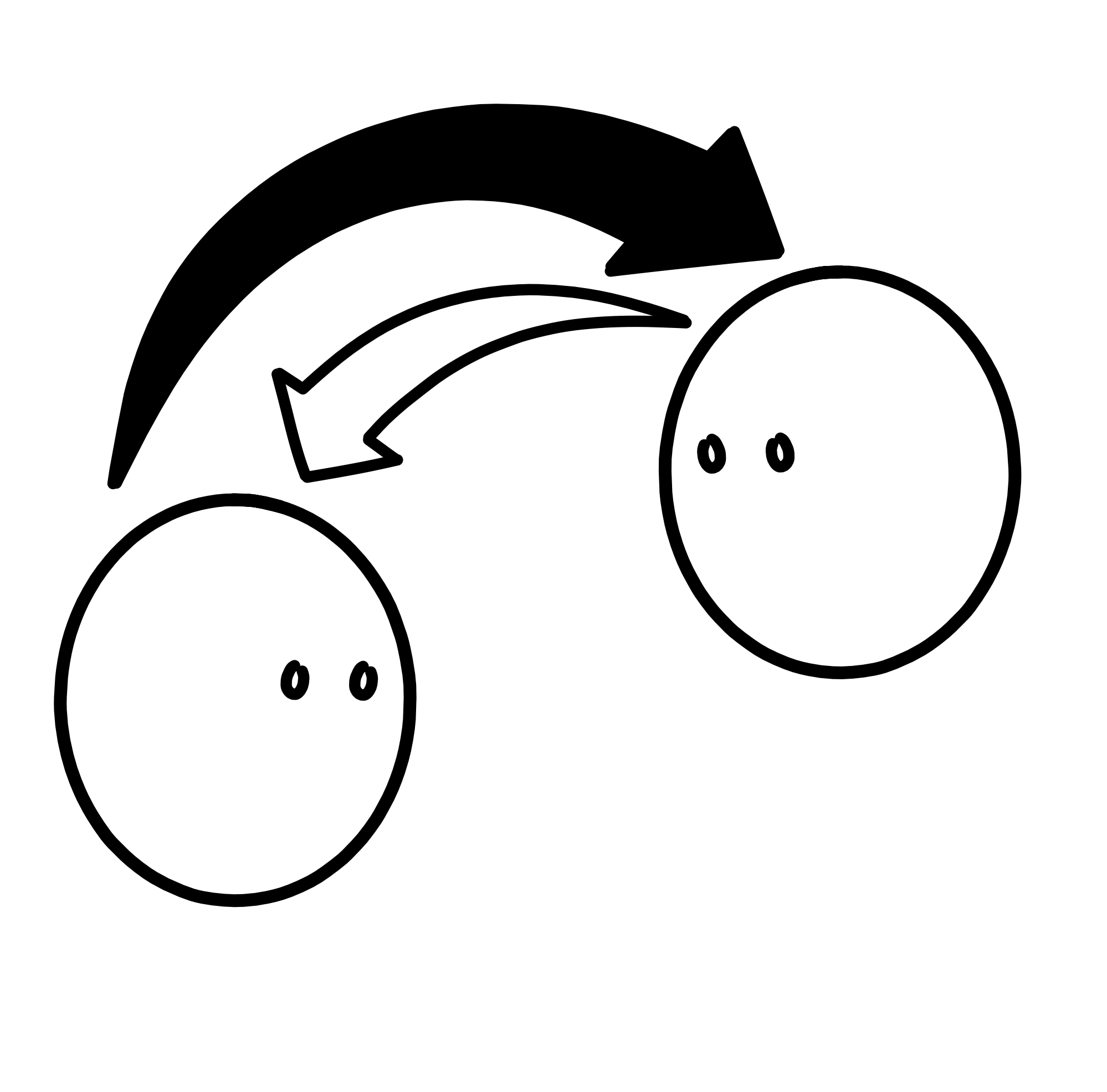
Peer-to-peer education for the spread of information

Peer education is effective in sharing information with its target population since people are more likely to listen to and engage with information when it comes from people with similar backgrounds. Youth who are often conflicting with the adults in their life find peer education to be especially useful. Peer health education trains students to educate other students on sexual health topics, and since youth often rely on their peers for information, training students is a tactic that organizations, such as Asian Health Services (AHS) in Oakland, CA, use to increase the spread of reliable information.

Major factors as to why Asian American youth have poor sexual health communication with their providers are confidentiality concerns, lack of knowledge about sexual health, and hesitancy and discomfort with discussions of these topics. By utilizing peer-led workshops and project teams, organizations, such as Asian Health Service Youth Program (AHSYP), engage in approaches that can improve knowledge and attitudes about sexual health topics for Asian American adolescents. Additionally, by using social media and technology to educate teens about reproductive and sexual health, Asian American youth have greater privacy to learn about and engage in those conversations, which helps address disparities that arise from cultural stigma.
