= 2025 Philippine local elections in the Davao Region =

- May 12, 2025
- Gubernatorial elections
- 5 provincial governors and 1 city mayor
Party	Seats	+/–
Nacionalista	2	0
PFP	2	New
HTL	1	New
Independent	1	+1
This lists parties that won seats. See the complete results below.
- Vice gubernatorial elections
- 5 provincial vice governors and 1 city vice mayor
Party	Seats	+/–
Nacionalista	2	0
PFP	2	New
HTL	1	0
Lakas	1	0
This lists parties that won seats. See the complete results below.
- Provincial Board elections
- 50 provincial board members and 24 city councilors
Party	Seats	+/–
HTL	19	+9
Lakas	19	+12
Nacionalista	12	−2
PFP	11	+11
NPC	5	New
PDP–Laban	5	+2
HNP	1	−29
Independent	2	−2
This lists parties that won seats. See the complete results below.

The 2025 Philippine local elections in the Davao Region were held on May 12, 2025.

== Summary ==
=== Governors ===
Province/city	Incumbent	Incumbent's party	Winner	Winner's party	Winning margin
Davao City (HUC)	Sebastian Duterte	HTL	Rodrigo Duterte	HTL	77.18%
Davao de Oro	Dorothy Gonzaga	PFP	Raul Mabanglo	Independent	2.82%
Davao del Norte	Edwin Jubahib	PFP	Edwin Jubahib	PFP	16.06%
Davao del Sur	Yvonne Roña Cagas	Nacionalista	Yvonne Roña Cagas	Nacionalista	49.31%
Davao Occidental	Franklin Bautista	PFP	Franklin Bautista	PFP	Unopposed
Davao Oriental	Niño Uy	PFP	Nelson Dayanghirang	Nacionalista	21.68%

=== Vice governors ===
Province/city	Incumbent	Incumbent's party	Winner	Winner's party	Winning margin
Davao City (HUC)	J. Melchor Quitain Jr.	HTL	Sebastian Duterte	HTL	77.63%
Davao de Oro	Tyron Uy	Lakas	Dorothy Gonzaga	PFP	5.52%
Davao del Norte	Oyo Uy	Lakas	Clarice Jubahib	PFP	10.91%
Davao del Sur	Aiai Cagas	PMP	Marc Douglas Cagas IV	Nacionalista	56.86%
Davao Occidental	Lorna Bautista-Bandigan	Lakas	Lorna Bautista-Bandigan	Lakas	Unopposed
Davao Oriental	Nelson Dayanghirang Jr.	Lakas	Glenda Rabat-Gayta	Nacionalista	18.34%

=== Provincial boards ===
Province/city	Seats	Party control		Composition
Province/city	Seats	Previous	Result	Composition
Davao City (HUC)	24 elected 2 ex-officio	No majority	HTL	HTL (19); PDP–Laban (4); HNP (1)
Davao de Oro	10 elected 4 ex-officio	No majority	No majority	PFP (5); Lakas (5)
Davao del Norte	10 elected 4 ex-officio	No majority	No majority	Lakas (5); PFP (4); Independent (1)
Davao del Sur	10 elected 4 ex-officio	No majority	Nacionalista	Nacionalista (9); Independent (1)
Davao Occidental	10 elected 3 ex-officio	Lakas	No majority	NPC (5); Lakas (5)
Davao Oriental	10 elected 4 ex-officio	No majority	No majority	Lakas (4); Nacionalista (3); PFP (2); PDP–Laban (1)

== Davao City ==
=== Mayor ===
Incumbent Mayor Sebastian Duterte of Hugpong sa Tawong Lungsod ran for vice mayor of Davao City. He was previously affiliated with Hugpong ng Pagbabago.

Hugpong sa Tawong Lungsod nominated Duterte's father, former President Rodrigo Duterte, who won the election against former Civil Service Commission chairman Karlo Nograles (Independent) and three other candidates. On March 11, 2025, Rodrigo Duterte was arrested by the Philippine National Police and Interpol under an International Criminal Court warrant charging him with crimes against humanity related to the Philippine drug war.

Candidate	Party	Votes	%
Rodrigo Duterte	Hugpong sa Tawong Lungsod	662,630	87.91
Karlo Nograles	Independent	80,852	10.73
Rod Cubos	Independent	7,757	1.03
Jonathan Julaine	Workers' and Peasants' Party	1,351	0.18
Joselito Tan	Independent	1,139	0.15
Total		753,729	100.00
Valid votes		753,729	96.98
Invalid/blank votes		23,508	3.02
Total votes		777,237	100.00
Registered voters/turnout		1,006,592	77.21
HTL hold			
Source: Commission on Elections

=== Vice Mayor ===
Incumbent Vice Mayor J. Melchor Quitain Jr. of Hugpong sa Tawong Lungsod ran for the Davao City Council in the 1st councilor district.

Hugpong sa Tawong Lungsod nominated Davao City mayor Sebastian Duterte, who won the election against city councilor Bernie Al-ag (Independent) and two other candidates.

Candidate	Party	Votes	%
Sebastian Duterte	Hugpong sa Tawong Lungsod	651,356	88.33
Bernie Al-ag	Independent	78,893	10.70
Oyie Soriano-Barcena	Independent	5,219	0.71
Richard Alcebar	Independent	1,924	0.26
Total		737,392	100.00
Valid votes		737,392	94.87
Invalid/blank votes		39,845	5.13
Total votes		777,237	100.00
Registered voters/turnout		1,006,592	77.21
HTL hold			
Source: Commission on Elections

=== City Council ===
The Davao City Council is composed of 26 councilors, 24 of whom are elected.

Hugpong sa Tawong Lungsod won 19 seats, gaining a majority in the city council.

Party	Votes	%	Seats	+/–
Hugpong sa Tawong Lungsod	2,907,891	60.84	19	+9
PDP–Laban	1,110,253	23.23	4	New
Lakas–CMD	171,741	3.59	0	New
Hugpong ng Pagbabago	165,173	3.46	1	–12
Partido Federal ng Pilipinas	133,695	2.80	0	New
Independent	290,781	6.08	0	–1
Total	4,779,534	100.00	24	0
Total votes	777,237	–		
Registered voters/turnout	1,006,592	77.21		
Source: Commission on Elections

==== 1st district ====
Davao City's 1st councilor district consists of the same area as Davao City's 1st legislative district. Eight councilors are elected from this councilor district.

23 candidates were included in the ballot.

Candidate	Party	Votes	%
Rodrigo Duterte II	Hugpong sa Tawong Lungsod	192,324	11.71
J. Melchor Quitain Jr.	Hugpong sa Tawong Lungsod	175,474	10.68
Luna Acosta (incumbent)	Hugpong ng Pagbabago	165,173	10.05
Cookie Bonguyan (incumbent)	Hugpong sa Tawong Lungsod	153,308	9.33
Bonz Militar (incumbent)	Hugpong sa Tawong Lungsod	150,626	9.17
Ragde Niño Ibuyan	Hugpong sa Tawong Lungsod	148,474	9.04
Tek Ocampo (incumbent)	Hugpong sa Tawong Lungsod	145,299	8.84
Pameng Librado	Hugpong sa Tawong Lungsod	132,709	8.08
TJ Corsino	Hugpong sa Tawong Lungsod	103,074	6.27
Nilo Abellera Jr. (incumbent)	Partido Federal ng Pilipinas	60,560	3.69
Cherry Al-ag	Independent	58,054	3.53
Priscilla Galope	Lakas–CMD	38,496	2.34
Eking Liparanon	Lakas–CMD	33,790	2.06
Archie Cubos	Independent	13,383	0.81
Bong Javier	Independent	13,289	0.81
Kariz Cubos-Martirez	Independent	10,310	0.63
Franz Gonzales	Independent	8,752	0.53
Mary Jane Aguinaldo	Independent	8,035	0.49
Ojeng Jabines	Independent	7,521	0.46
Jen-jen Dulla	Independent	7,163	0.44
Alvin Roy	Independent	6,094	0.37
Antonette Sabes	Independent	6,083	0.37
Bitoy Villasis	Independent	5,055	0.31
Total		1,643,046	100.00
Total votes		266,574	–
Registered voters/turnout		366,439	72.75
Source: Commission on Elections

==== 2nd district ====
Davao City's 2nd councilor district consists of the same area as Davao City's 2nd legislative district. Eight councilors are elected from this councilor district.

25 candidates were included in the ballot.

Candidate	Party	Votes	%
Diosdado Mahipus (incumbent)	Hugpong sa Tawong Lungsod	148,171	9.16
Ralph Abella	PDP–Laban	148,070	9.15
Louie John Bonguyan (incumbent)	Hugpong sa Tawong Lungsod	136,994	8.47
Che Che Justol (incumbent)	Hugpong sa Tawong Lungsod	136,078	8.41
Al Ryan Alejandre (incumbent)	Hugpong sa Tawong Lungsod	129,868	8.03
Danny Dayanghirang	Hugpong sa Tawong Lungsod	124,065	7.67
Nonong Cabling	PDP–Laban	115,481	7.14
Doce Apostol	PDP–Laban	112,625	6.96
Jonard Dayap (incumbent)	Hugpong sa Tawong Lungsod	106,815	6.60
Jimmy Dureza	PDP–Laban	91,935	5.68
Allan Simo-ag	PDP–Laban	83,453	5.16
Nilo Cabiles	PDP–Laban	80,243	4.96
Dayang Orcullo	PDP–Laban	55,869	3.45
Mac Quilaneta	Lakas–CMD	49,955	3.09
Pao Salvador	Partido Federal ng Pilipinas	31,925	1.97
Janel Banzon	Partido Federal ng Pilipinas	20,501	1.27
Mary Crystel Abrenica	Independent	9,722	0.60
Regidor Cortez	Independent	7,925	0.49
Erwin Uy	Independent	6,196	0.38
Yang Felipas	Independent	4,022	0.25
Henry Respecia	Independent	3,820	0.24
Tony Emberda	Independent	3,743	0.23
Keith Corton	Independent	3,571	0.22
Felochie Gencianos	Independent	3,256	0.20
Venz Cañonera	Independent	3,233	0.20
Total		1,617,536	100.00
Total votes		261,350	–
Registered voters/turnout		332,318	78.64
Source: Commission on Elections

==== 3rd district ====
Davao City's 3rd councilor district consists of the same area as Davao City's 3rd legislative district. Eight councilors are elected from this councilor district.

27 candidates were included in the ballot.

Candidate	Party	Votes	%
Alberto Ungab (incumbent)	Hugpong sa Tawong Lungsod	153,433	10.10
Enzo Villafuerte (incumbent)	PDP–Laban	144,270	9.50
Sweet Advincula (incumbent)	Hugpong sa Tawong Lungsod	137,001	9.02
Petite Principe	Hugpong sa Tawong Lungsod	129,490	8.52
Rachel Zozobrado	Hugpong sa Tawong Lungsod	129,292	8.51
Potpot Villafuerte (incumbent)	Hugpong sa Tawong Lungsod	128,425	8.45
Jopet Baluran	Hugpong sa Tawong Lungsod	125,895	8.29
Myrna Dalodo-Ortiz (incumbent)	Hugpong sa Tawong Lungsod	121,076	7.97
Abay Bargamento	PDP–Laban	100,110	6.59
Bebot Clarion	PDP–Laban	89,598	5.90
Rodolfo Mande	PDP–Laban	88,599	5.83
Momay Al-ag	Lakas–CMD	49,500	3.26
Jetjet Pantig	Independent	39,845	2.62
Larry Franco	Partido Federal ng Pilipinas	20,709	1.36
Carmela Merquita	Independent	7,357	0.48
Rowena Soriano-Donato	Independent	6,684	0.44
Ramil Fernando Brucal	Independent	6,122	0.40
Efren Desierto	Independent	5,975	0.39
Julie Leah Echalico	Independent	5,114	0.34
Manuel Mendoza	Independent	4,842	0.32
Michael Cabalhin	Independent	4,614	0.30
Leonora Digna Naraval	Independent	4,500	0.30
Junrich Sumile Malolot	Independent	4,288	0.28
Ricky Castillote	Independent	3,725	0.25
Daniel Guillen	Independent	2,879	0.19
Exequiel Placio	Independent	2,833	0.19
Luis Narisma	Independent	2,776	0.18
Total		1,518,952	100.00
Total votes		249,313	–
Registered voters/turnout		307,835	80.99
Source: Commission on Elections

== Davao de Oro ==
=== Governor ===
Incumbent Governor Dorothy Gonzaga of the Partido Federal ng Pilipinas (PFP) ran for vice governor of Davao de Oro. She was previously affiliated with the Partido para sa Demokratikong Reporma.

The PFP nominated Gonzaga's husband, representative Ruwel Peter Gonzaga, who was defeated by Davao de Oro Liga ng mga Barangay president Raul Mabanglo, an independent.

Candidate	Party	Votes	%
Raul Mabanglo	Independent	239,933	51.41
Ruwel Peter Gonzaga	Partido Federal ng Pilipinas	226,788	48.59
Total		466,721	100.00
Valid votes		466,721	95.13
Invalid/blank votes		23,908	4.87
Total votes		490,629	100.00
Registered voters/turnout		548,390	89.47
Independent gain from PFP			
Source: Commission on Elections

=== Vice Governor ===
Incumbent Vice Governor Tyron Uy of Lakas–CMD retired. He was previously affiliated with Hugpong ng Pagbabago.

Davao de Oro governor Dorothy Gonzaga (Partido Federal ng Pilipinas) won the election against provincial board member Kris Caballero(Independent).

Candidate	Party	Votes	%
Dorothy Gonzaga	Partido Federal ng Pilipinas	239,661	52.76
Kris Caballero	Independent	214,570	47.24
Total		454,231	100.00
Valid votes		454,231	92.58
Invalid/blank votes		36,398	7.42
Total votes		490,629	100.00
Registered voters/turnout		548,390	89.47
PFP gain from Lakas			
Source: Commission on Elections

=== Provincial Board ===
The Davao de Oro Provincial Board is composed of 14 board members, 10 of whom are elected.

The Partido Federal ng Pilipinas tied with Lakas–CMD at five seats each.

Party	Votes	%	Seats	+/–
Partido Federal ng Pilipinas	827,236	45.30	5	New
Lakas–CMD	752,264	41.20	5	New
Akbayan	58,734	3.22	0	New
Reform PH Party	4,466	0.24	0	New
Independent	183,242	10.04	0	–1
Total	1,825,942	100.00	10	0
Total votes	490,629	–		
Registered voters/turnout	548,390	89.47		
Source: Commission on Elections

==== 1st district ====
Davao de Oro's 1st provincial district consists of the same area as Davao de Oro's 1st legislative district. Five board members are elected from this provincial district.

11 candidates were included in the ballot.

Candidate	Party	Votes	%
Herv Apsay (incumbent)	Lakas–CMD	109,715	12.91
May Codilla	Lakas–CMD	94,355	11.10
Tata Basañes	Lakas–CMD	91,319	10.74
Joanna Gentugaya	Partido Federal ng Pilipinas	89,626	10.54
Ramil Gentugaya	Partido Federal ng Pilipinas	86,386	10.16
Topoy Jayectin (incumbent)	Lakas–CMD	84,148	9.90
Willy Ang (incumbent)	Partido Federal ng Pilipinas	79,752	9.38
Paul Galicia	Lakas–CMD	77,370	9.10
Nenz Atamosa	Partido Federal ng Pilipinas	74,158	8.72
Dex Lopoz	Akbayan	58,734	6.91
Jovito Cadigal	Reform PH Party	4,466	0.53
Total		850,029	100.00
Total votes		219,944	–
Registered voters/turnout		245,824	89.47
Source: Commission on Elections

==== 2nd district ====
Davao de Oro's 2nd provincial district consists of the same area as Davao de Oro's 2nd legislative district. Five board members are elected from this provincial district.

11 candidates were included in the ballot.

Candidate	Party	Votes	%
Ruwina Gonzaga (incumbent)	Partido Federal ng Pilipinas	111,266	11.40
Conie Caballero	Lakas–CMD	106,224	10.88
Francis Secuya	Partido Federal ng Pilipinas	99,380	10.18
Macario Humol	Lakas–CMD	98,748	10.12
Cesar Richa	Partido Federal ng Pilipinas	96,863	9.93
Bebot Arancon (incumbent)	Partido Federal ng Pilipinas	95,319	9.77
Yeng Libuangan	Partido Federal ng Pilipinas	94,486	9.68
Ramil Maquilan	Independent	91,084	9.33
Cathy Uy	Lakas–CMD	90,385	9.26
Jun Tabas	Independent	81,301	8.33
Vedorin Takasan	Independent	10,857	1.11
Total		975,913	100.00
Total votes		270,685	–
Registered voters/turnout		302,566	89.46
Source: Commission on Elections

== Davao del Norte ==
=== Governor ===
Incumbent Governor Edwin Jubahib of the Partido Federal ng Pilipinas ran for a full term. He was previously affiliated with the Partido para sa Demokratikong Reporma.

Re-elected for a second term in 2022, Jubahib was suspended by the Office of the President from April 8 to July 8, 2024, for various administrative complaints.

Jubahib won the election against representative Alan Dujali (Lakas–CMD).

Candidate	Party	Votes	%
Edwin Jubahib (incumbent)	Partido Federal ng Pilipinas	323,396	58.03
Alan Dujali	Lakas–CMD	233,853	41.97
Total		557,249	100.00
Valid votes		557,249	92.52
Invalid/blank votes		45,076	7.48
Total votes		602,325	100.00
Registered voters/turnout		717,449	83.95
PFP hold			
Source: Commission on Elections

=== Vice Governor ===
Incumbent Vice Governor Oyo Uy of Lakas–CMD ran for the House of Representatives in Davao del Norte's 1st legislative district. He was previously affiliated with Hugpong ng Pagbabago.

Lakas–CMD nominated provincial board member Teteo So, who was defeated by Governor Edwin Jubahib's daughter, Clarice Jubahib of the Partido Federal ng Pilipinas. Representative Pantaleon Alvarez (Partido para sa Demokratikong Reporma) also ran for vice governor.

Candidate	Party	Votes	%
Clarice Jubahib	Partido Federal ng Pilipinas	226,663	42.56
Tete So	Lakas–CMD	168,544	31.65
Pantaleon Alvarez	Partido para sa Demokratikong Reporma	137,362	25.79
Total		532,569	100.00
Valid votes		532,569	88.42
Invalid/blank votes		69,756	11.58
Total votes		602,325	100.00
Registered voters/turnout		717,449	83.95
PFP gain from Lakas			
Source: Commission on Elections

=== Provincial Board ===
The Davao del Norte Provincial Board is composed of 14 board members, 10 of whom are elected.

Lakas–CMD won five seats, becoming the largest party in the provincial board.

Party	Votes	%	Seats	+/–
Lakas–CMD	998,504	46.93	5	New
Partido Federal ng Pilipinas	852,840	40.08	4	New
Reform PH Party	30,783	1.45	0	New
Partido para sa Demokratikong Reporma	25,702	1.21	0	–3
Independent	219,859	10.33	1	+1
Total	2,127,688	100.00	10	0
Total votes	602,325	–		
Registered voters/turnout	717,449	83.95		
Source: Commission on Elections

==== 1st district ====
Davao del Norte's 1st provincial district consists of the same area as Davao del Norte's 1st legislative district. Five board members are elected from this provincial district.

12 candidates were included in the ballot.

Candidate	Party	Votes	%
Lou Suaybaguio	Partido Federal ng Pilipinas	113,064	10.70
Popo Estabillo (incumbent)	Partido Federal ng Pilipinas	112,503	10.64
Bong Aala	Lakas–CMD	111,393	10.54
Jane Ang	Lakas–CMD	109,494	10.36
Ronald Eliot	Partido Federal ng Pilipinas	102,840	9.73
Raymond Joey Millan	Lakas–CMD	94,237	8.92
Ana Emelita Alvarez	Independent	89,240	8.44
Erap Estrada	Lakas–CMD	86,814	8.21
Jan Dmitri Sator	Partido Federal ng Pilipinas	81,966	7.75
Kid Libunao	Lakas–CMD	70,989	6.72
Roger Laguna	Partido Federal ng Pilipinas	58,749	5.56
Audrie Perez	Partido para sa Demokratikong Reporma	25,702	2.43
Total		1,056,991	100.00
Total votes		290,211	–
Registered voters/turnout		347,453	83.53
Source: Commission on Elections

==== 2nd district ====
Davao del Norte's 2nd provincial district consists of the same area as Davao del Norte's 2nd legislative district. Five board members are elected from this provincial district.

12 candidates were included in the ballot.

Candidate	Party	Votes	%
Jigs Relampagos	Partido Federal ng Pilipinas	130,069	12.15
Popop Catalan (incumbent)	Lakas–CMD	129,119	12.06
Al David Uy	Independent	118,571	11.07
Orly Amit (incumbent)	Lakas–CMD	110,343	10.31
Poloy Enad	Lakas–CMD	109,544	10.23
Denise Marianne Lu (incumbent)	Lakas–CMD	108,592	10.14
Tata Moral-Romano	Partido Federal ng Pilipinas	96,060	8.97
Erning Evangelista	Partido Federal ng Pilipinas	94,695	8.84
Hur Camporedondo	Lakas–CMD	67,979	6.35
Josie Jean Rabanoz	Partido Federal ng Pilipinas	62,894	5.87
Boy Tanong	Reform PH Party	30,783	2.88
Omar Macangga	Independent	12,048	1.13
Total		1,070,697	100.00
Total votes		312,114	–
Registered voters/turnout		369,996	84.36
Source: Commission on Elections

== Davao del Sur ==
=== Governor ===
Incumbent Governor Yvonne Roña Cagas of the Nacionalista Party ran for a second term.

Cagas won re-election against Davao del Sur vice governor Aiai Cagas (Pwersa ng Masang Pilipino) and Jun Lustre (Independent).

Candidate	Party	Votes	%
Yvonne Roña Cagas (incumbent)	Nacionalista Party	256,486	73.95
Aiai Cagas	Pwersa ng Masang Pilipino	85,463	24.64
Jun Lustre	Independent	4,903	1.41
Total		346,852	100.00
Valid votes		346,852	91.00
Invalid/blank votes		34,287	9.00
Total votes		381,139	100.00
Registered voters/turnout		465,227	81.93
Nacionalista hold			
Source: Commission on Elections

=== Vice Governor ===
Incumbent Vice Governor Aiai Cagas of Pwersa ng Masang Pilipino ran for governor of Davao del Sur. She was previously affiliated with the Nacionalista Party.

Cagas' cousin, former Davao del Sur governor Marc Douglas Cagas IV (Nacionalista Party), won the election against provincial board member Cowboy Cadungog (Independent).

Candidate	Party	Votes	%
Marc Douglas Cagas IV	Nacionalista Party	259,364	78.43
Cowboy Cadungog	Independent	71,323	21.57
Total		330,687	100.00
Valid votes		330,687	86.76
Invalid/blank votes		50,452	13.24
Total votes		381,139	100.00
Registered voters/turnout		465,227	81.93
Nacionalista gain from PMP			
Source: Commission on Elections

=== Provincial Board ===
The Davao del Sur Provincial Board is composed of 14 board members, 10 of whom are elected.

The Nacionalista Party won nine seats, gaining a majority in the provincial board.

Party	Votes	%	Seats	+/–
Nacionalista Party	851,295	65.99	9	+2
Akbayan	33,852	2.62	0	New
Independent	404,947	31.39	1	+1
Total	1,290,094	100.00	10	0
Total votes	381,139	–		
Registered voters/turnout	465,227	81.93		
Source: Commission on Elections

==== 1st district ====
Davao del Sur's 1st provincial district consists of the city of Digos and the municipalities of Bansalan and Santa Cruz. Five board members are elected from this provincial district.

11 candidates were included in the ballot.

Candidate	Party	Votes	%
Rey Ayo (incumbent)	Nacionalista Party	88,275	13.71
Rey Aballe	Nacionalista Party	75,049	11.66
Shiela Cagas (incumbent)	Nacionalista Party	72,936	11.33
Marla Almendras	Nacionalista Party	72,092	11.20
Erwin Llanos	Independent	65,848	10.23
Frank Tongcos (incumbent)	Nacionalista Party	64,171	9.97
Lani Gabutero	Independent	62,704	9.74
Lex Josef Cagas	Independent	59,278	9.21
Vic Cadungog (incumbent)	Independent	48,211	7.49
Hazel Latasa-Escabillas	Independent	30,763	4.78
Mar Decena	Independent	4,390	0.68
Total		643,717	100.00
Total votes		190,343	–
Registered voters/turnout		239,675	79.42
Source: Commission on Elections

==== 2nd district ====
Davao del Sur's 2nd provincial district consists of the municipalities of Hagonoy, Kiblawan, Magsaysay, Malalag, Matanao, Padada and Sulop. Five board members are elected from this provincial district.

10 candidates were included in the ballot.

Candidate	Party	Votes	%
Mark Joel Gallardo (incumbent)	Nacionalista Party	101,364	15.75
Carmelo delos Cientos III (incumbent)	Nacionalista Party	99,907	15.53
Gladys Razonable-Gascon	Nacionalista Party	97,437	15.14
Kyra Valentin	Nacionalista Party	92,211	14.33
Dyane Giduquio-Idulsa	Nacionalista Party	84,853	13.19
Marivic Caminero	Independent	41,509	6.45
Ranjeh Cadungog	Independent	41,222	6.41
Tyrone dela Cerna	Independent	35,547	5.53
Linmer Bello	Akbayan	33,852	5.26
Edgardo Luague	Independent	15,475	2.41
Total		643,377	100.00
Total votes		190,796	–
Registered voters/turnout		225,552	84.59
Source: Commission on Elections

== Davao Occidental ==
=== Governor ===
Incumbent Governor Franklin Bautista of the Partido Federal ng Pilipinas won re-election for a second term unopposed. He was previously affiliated with Lakas–CMD.

Candidate	Party	Votes	%
Franklin Bautista (incumbent)	Partido Federal ng Pilipinas	104,009	100.00
Total		104,009	100.00
Valid votes		104,009	68.71
Invalid/blank votes		47,367	31.29
Total votes		151,376	100.00
Registered voters/turnout		205,167	73.78
PFP hold			
Source: Commission on Elections

=== Vice Governor ===
Incumbent Vice Governor Lorna Bautista-Bandigan of Lakas–CMD won re-election for a second term unopposed.

Candidate	Party	Votes	%
Lorna Bautista-Bandigan (incumbent)	Lakas–CMD	99,030	100.00
Total		99,030	100.00
Valid votes		99,030	65.42
Invalid/blank votes		52,346	34.58
Total votes		151,376	100.00
Registered voters/turnout		205,167	73.78
Lakas hold			
Source: Commission on Elections

=== Provincial Board ===
Since Davao Occidental's reclassification as a 2nd class province in 2025, the Davao Occidental Provincial Board is composed of 13 board members, 10 of whom are elected.

The Nationalist People's Coalition tied with Lakas–CMD at five seats each.

Party	Votes	%	Seats	+/–
Nationalist People's Coalition	244,725	55.59	5	New
Lakas–CMD	174,577	39.65	5	–1
Independent	20,950	4.76	0	–2
Total	440,252	100.00	10	+2
Total votes	151,376	–		
Registered voters/turnout	205,167	73.78		
Source: Commission on Elections

==== 1st district ====
Davao Occidental's 1st provincial district consists of the municipalities of Malita and Santa Maria. Six board members are elected from this provincial district.

Eight candidates were included in the ballot.

Candidate	Party	Votes	%
Zaldy Lataban	Nationalist People's Coalition	50,841	17.66
Enteng Bautista	Nationalist People's Coalition	49,473	17.19
Romeo Lopez	Nationalist People's Coalition	41,267	14.34
Amel Vistal	Nationalist People's Coalition	38,732	13.46
Caloy Baliota	Lakas–CMD	33,640	11.69
Rogelio Baribar (incumbent)	Lakas–CMD	30,873	10.73
Ali Colina Jr. (incumbent)	Lakas–CMD	28,479	9.89
Reynaldo Abad	Independent	14,546	5.05
Total		287,851	100.00
Total votes		83,049	–
Registered voters/turnout		110,099	75.43
Source: Commission on Elections

==== 2nd district ====
Davao Occidental's 2nd provincial district consists of the municipalities of Don Marcelino, Jose Abad Santos and Sarangani. Four board members are elected from this provincial district.

10 candidates were included in the ballot.

Candidate	Party	Votes	%
Jay Ar Galias (incumbent)	Lakas–CMD	24,856	16.31
Danilo Omicas (incumbent)	Lakas–CMD	24,694	16.20
Jes Atay	Lakas–CMD	19,753	12.96
Malik Olarte	Nationalist People's Coalition	18,270	11.99
Precious Jane Sioco	Nationalist People's Coalition	17,521	11.50
Maximo Guardados Jr.	Nationalist People's Coalition	14,405	9.45
Jet-jet Wangkay	Nationalist People's Coalition	14,216	9.33
Jinelyn Cawa II	Lakas–CMD	12,282	8.06
Alvin Camandon	Independent	4,714	3.09
April Dabuan	Independent	1,690	1.11
Total		152,401	100.00
Total votes		68,327	–
Registered voters/turnout		95,068	71.87
Source: Commission on Elections

== Davao Oriental ==
=== Governor ===
Incumbent Governor Niño Uy of the Partido Federal ng Pilipinas ran for a full term. He became governor on June 28, 2023, after the death of Corazon Nuñez Malanyaon.

Uy was defeated by representative Nelson Dayanghirang of the Nacionalista Party.

Candidate	Party	Votes	%
Nelson Dayanghirang	Nacionalista Party	219,085	60.84
Niño Uy (incumbent)	Partido Federal ng Pilipinas	141,001	39.16
Total		360,086	100.00
Valid votes		360,086	95.66
Invalid/blank votes		16,333	4.34
Total votes		376,419	100.00
Registered voters/turnout		433,645	86.80
Nacionalista gain from PFP			
Source: Commission on Elections

=== Vice Governor ===
Incumbent Vice Governor Nelson Dayanghirang Jr. of Lakas–CMD ran for the House of Representatives in Davao Oriental's 1st legislative district. He became vice governor on June 28, 2023, after Niño Uy became governor upon Corazon Nuñez Malanyaon's death.

Dayanghirang endorsed former Mati vice mayor Glenda Rabat-Gayta (Nacionalista Party), who won the election against Louie Malanyaon (Partido Federal ng Pilipinas), the widower of former Governor Corazon Nuñez Malanyaon, and two other candidates.

Candidate	Party	Votes	%
Glenda Rabat-Gayta	Nacionalista Party	185,283	58.54
Louie Malanyaon	Partido Federal ng Pilipinas	127,234	40.20
Delfin Sulamin	Independent	2,170	0.69
Al Reyes	Independent	1,837	0.58
Total		316,524	100.00
Valid votes		316,524	84.09
Invalid/blank votes		59,895	15.91
Total votes		376,419	100.00
Registered voters/turnout		433,645	86.80
Nacionalista gain from Lakas			
Source: Commission on Elections

=== Provincial Board ===
The Davao Oriental Provincial Board is composed of 14 board members, 10 of whom are elected.

Lakas–CMD won four seats, becoming the largest party in the provincial board.

Party	Votes	%	Seats	+/–
Partido Federal ng Pilipinas	500,066	37.13	2	New
Lakas–CMD	393,460	29.21	4	New
Nacionalista Party	336,858	25.01	3	–4
PDP–Laban	84,686	6.29	1	New
Independent	31,862	2.37	0	0
Total	1,346,932	100.00	10	0
Total votes	376,419	–		
Registered voters/turnout	433,645	86.80		
Source: Commission on Elections

==== 1st district ====
Davao Oriental's 1st provincial district consists of the same area as Davao Oriental's 1st legislative district. Five board members are elected from this provincial district.

13 candidates were included in the ballot.

Candidate	Party	Votes	%
Beverly Dayanan	Partido Federal ng Pilipinas	70,120	12.53
Jun Lepardo	Nacionalista Party	68,403	12.22
Tata Nuñez-Castro (incumbent)	Lakas–CMD	62,293	11.13
Elijah Palma Gil	Nacionalista Party	61,279	10.95
Louis Arturo Monday	Nacionalista Party	58,204	10.40
Andy Monday (incumbent)	Lakas–CMD	57,242	10.23
Maria Lady Macayra	Partido Federal ng Pilipinas	58,483	10.45
Michelle Malanyaon	Partido Federal ng Pilipinas	43,381	7.75
Jo Ann Mariano	Partido Federal ng Pilipinas	41,237	7.37
Nennette Palmera (incumbent)	Partido Federal ng Pilipinas	33,163	5.93
Lumon Atason	Independent	2,395	0.43
Bomboy Delagua	Independent	1,956	0.35
Regie Plaza	Independent	1,522	0.27
Total		559,678	100.00
Total votes		152,500	–
Registered voters/turnout		174,878	87.20
Source: Commission on Elections

==== 2nd district ====
Davao Oriental's 2nd provincial district consists of the same area as Davao Oriental's 2nd legislative district. Five board members are elected from this provincial district.

11 candidates were included in the ballot.

Candidate	Party	Votes	%
Harold Montes (incumbent)	Lakas–CMD	103,139	13.10
Daud Linsag (incumbent)	Lakas–CMD	88,680	11.26
Popong Uy (incumbent)	Partido Federal ng Pilipinas	88,592	11.25
Don Go Montojo	PDP–Laban	84,686	10.76
Rotchie Ravelo (incumbent)	Lakas–CMD	82,106	10.43
Rem Tambuang	Nacionalista Party	81,442	10.35
Lito Macatabog	Nacionalista Party	67,530	8.58
Popoy Trocio	Partido Federal ng Pilipinas	57,153	7.26
Arman Valera	Partido Federal ng Pilipinas	56,357	7.16
Rhea Clarabal	Partido Federal ng Pilipinas	51,580	6.55
Carlito Sagapan	Independent	25,989	3.30
Total		787,254	100.00
Total votes		223,919	–
Registered voters/turnout		258,767	86.53
Source: Commission on Elections
