= 2022 Philippine local elections in the Davao Region =

- May 9, 2022
- Gubernatorial elections
- 5 provincial governors and 1 city mayor
Party	Seats	+/–
HNP	2	−1
Nacionalista	2	+1
Lakas	1	New
Reporma	1	New
This lists parties that won seats. See the complete results below.
- Vice gubernatorial elections
- 5 provincial vice governors and 1 city vice mayor
Party	Seats	+/–
HNP	2	−1
Nacionalista	2	0
HTL	1	New
Lakas	1	New
This lists parties that won seats. See the complete results below.
- Provincial Board elections
- 48 provincial board members and 24 city councilors
Party	Seats	+/–
HNP	30	−10
Nacionalista	14	+2
HTL	10	+6
Lakas	7	New
PDP–Laban	3	−4
Reporma	3	New
PROMDI	1	New
Independent	4	−1
This lists parties that won seats. See the complete results below.

The 2022 Philippine local elections in the Davao Region were held on May 9, 2022.

== Summary ==
=== Governors ===
Province/city	Incumbent	Incumbent's party	Winner	Winner's party	Winning margin
Davao City (HUC)	Sara Duterte	Lakas	Sebastian Duterte	HNP	79.20%
Davao de Oro	Tyron Uy	HNP	Dorothy Gonzaga	Reporma	8.64%
Davao del Norte	Edwin Jubahib	HNP	Edwin Jubahib	HNP	21.22%
Davao del Sur	Marc Douglas Cagas IV	Nacionalista	Yvonne Roña Cagas	Nacionalista	16.78%
Davao Occidental	Claude Bautista	HNP	Franklin Bautista	Lakas	Unopposed
Davao Oriental	Nelson Dayanghirang	Nacionalista	Corazon Nuñez Malanyaon	Nacionalista	Unopposed

=== Vice governors ===
Province/city	Incumbent	Incumbent's party	Winner	Winner's party	Winning margin
Davao City (HUC)	Sebastian Duterte	HNP	J. Melchor Quitain Jr.	HTL	Unopposed
Davao de Oro	Maricar Zamora	HNP	Tyron Uy	HNP	23.66%
Davao del Norte	Rey Uy	HNP	Oyo Uy	HNP	17.28%
Davao del Sur	John Tracy Cagas	Nacionalista	Aiai Cagas-Fernandez	Nacionalista	51.92%
Davao Occidental	Franklin Bautista	Lakas	Lorna Bautista-Bandigan	Lakas	Unopposed
Davao Oriental	Niño Uy	Nacionalista	Niño Uy	Nacionalista	25.10%

=== Provincial boards ===
Province/city	Seats	Party control		Composition
Province/city	Seats	Previous	Result	Composition
Davao City (HUC)	24 elected 2 ex-officio	HNP	No majority	HNP (13); HTL (10); Independent (1)
Davao de Oro	10 elected 4 ex-officio	No majority	No majority	HNP (7); PDP–Laban (2); Independent (1)
Davao del Norte	10 elected 4 ex-officio	No majority	No majority	HNP (7); Reporma (3)
Davao del Sur	10 elected 4 ex-officio	No majority	No majority	Nacionalista (7); PDP–Laban (1); PROMDI (1); Lakas (1)
Davao Occidental	8 elected 3 ex-officio	HNP	Lakas	Lakas (6); Independent (2)
Davao Oriental	10 elected 4 ex-officio	Nacionalista	No majority	Nacionalista (7); HNP (3)

== Davao City ==
=== Mayor ===
Incumbent Mayor Sara Duterte of Lakas–CMD initially ran for a third term, but later ran for Vice President of the Philippines. She was previously affiliated with Hugpong ng Pagbabago.

Duterte was substituted by her brother, Davao City vice mayor Sebastian Duterte, who won the election against former representative Ruy Elias Lopez (Independent) and two other candidates.

Candidate	Party	Votes	%
Sebastian Duterte	Hugpong ng Pagbabago	621,766	89.30
Ruy Elias Lopez	Independent	70,322	10.10
Joseph Hannibal Elizalde	Independent	3,144	0.45
Teddy Mantilla	Independent	1,051	0.15
Total		696,283	100.00
Total votes		737,371	–
Registered voters/turnout		992,538	74.29
HNP gain from Lakas			
Source: Commission on Elections

=== Vice Mayor ===
Incumbent Vice Mayor Sebastian Duterte of Hugpong ng Pagbabago initially ran for a second term, but later substituted Sara Duterte to run for mayor of Davao City.

Duterte was substituted by city councilor J. Melchor Quitain Jr. (Hugpong sa Tawong Lungsod), who won the election unopposed.

Candidate	Party	Votes	%
J. Melchor Quitain Jr.	Hugpong sa Tawong Lungsod	561,976	100.00
Total		561,976	100.00
Total votes		737,371	–
Registered voters/turnout		992,538	74.29
HTL gain from HNP			
Source: Commission on Elections

=== City Council ===
The Davao City Council is composed of 26 councilors, 24 of whom are elected.

Hugpong ng Pagbabago remained as the largest party in the city council with 13 seats, but lost its majority.

Party	Votes	%	Seats	+/–
Hugpong ng Pagbabago	1,984,693	47.12	13	–6
Hugpong sa Tawong Lungsod	1,852,573	43.98	10	+6
Partido Pilipino sa Pagbabago	41,979	1.00	0	New
Reform Party	28,075	0.67	0	New
Independent	304,903	7.24	1	0
Total	4,212,223	100.00	24	0
Total votes	737,371	–		
Registered voters/turnout	992,538	74.29		

==== 1st district ====
Davao City's 1st councilor district consists of the same area as Davao City's 1st legislative district. Eight councilors are elected from this councilor district.

16 candidates were included in the ballot.

Candidate	Party	Votes	%
Kap Ibuyan (incumbent)	Hugpong ng Pagbabago	156,764	10.37
Luna Acosta	Hugpong ng Pagbabago	153,835	10.17
Jessica Bonguyan (incumbent)	Independent	146,458	9.69
Tek Ocampo	Hugpong ng Pagbabago	144,502	9.56
Bernie Al-ag	Hugpong ng Pagbabago	141,273	9.34
Bonz Militar	Hugpong sa Tawong Lungsod	138,891	9.19
Pilar Braga (incumbent)	Hugpong sa Tawong Lungsod	132,506	8.76
Nilo Abellera Jr. (incumbent)	Hugpong ng Pagbabago	103,383	6.84
Richard Duterte	Hugpong sa Tawong Lungsod	101,868	6.74
Tambi Sarenas	Hugpong sa Tawong Lungsod	86,777	5.74
Pamela Librado (incumbent)	Hugpong sa Tawong Lungsod	65,442	4.33
Lyndon Banzon	Independent	48,144	3.18
Reolsyl Caingles	Hugpong ng Pagbabago	36,365	2.41
Randy Ponteras	Partido Pilipino sa Pagbabago	27,029	1.79
Allan Halog	Partido Pilipino sa Pagbabago	14,950	0.99
Ismael Veloso Jr.	Independent	13,779	0.91
Total		1,511,966	100.00
Total votes		259,451	–
Registered voters/turnout		355,052	73.07
Source: Commission on Elections

==== 2nd district ====
Davao City's 2nd councilor district consists of the same area as Davao City's 2nd legislative district. Eight councilors are elected from this councilor district.

15 candidates were included in the ballot.

Candidate	Party	Votes	%
Che Che Justol	Hugpong sa Tawong Lungsod	175,678	11.62
Javi Garcia Campos (incumbent)	Hugpong ng Pagbabago	172,795	11.43
Louie John Bonguyan (incumbent)	Hugpong ng Pagbabago	164,401	10.88
Dante Apostol (incumbent)	Hugpong sa Tawong Lungsod	153,960	10.19
Diosdado Mahipus (incumbent)	Hugpong sa Tawong Lungsod	152,160	10.07
Jonard Dayap (incumbent)	Hugpong ng Pagbabago	150,707	9.97
Marissa Abella	Hugpong sa Tawong Lungsod	148,333	9.81
Al Ryan Alejandre	Hugpong sa Tawong Lungsod	137,896	9.12
Danilo Dayanghirang II	Hugpong ng Pagbabago	130,926	8.66
Pao Salvador	Independent	35,853	2.37
Joel Bustamante	Reform Party	28,075	1.86
Reyvan Abad	Independent	24,174	1.60
Eller Bantugan	Independent	17,653	1.17
Bong Batenga	Independent	10,293	0.68
Chris Galang	Independent	8,549	0.57
Total		1,511,453	100.00
Total votes		257,891	–
Registered voters/turnout		354,747	72.70
Source: Commission on Elections

==== 3rd district ====
Davao City's 3rd councilor district consists of the same area as Davao City's 3rd legislative district. Eight councilors are elected from this councilor district.

10 candidates were included in the ballot.

Candidate	Party	Votes	%
Alberto Ungab (incumbent)	Hugpong ng Pagbabago	160,241	13.48
Nonoy Al-ag (incumbent)	Hugpong sa Tawong Lungsod	137,185	11.54
Potpot Villafuerte	Hugpong ng Pagbabago	123,921	10.42
Myrna Dalodo-Ortiz (incumbent)	Hugpong ng Pagbabago	120,816	10.16
Sweet Advincula (incumbent)	Hugpong sa Tawong Lungsod	120,335	10.12
Cocoy Zozobrado (incumbent)	Hugpong ng Pagbabago	119,625	10.06
Conde Baluran (incumbent)	Hugpong sa Tawong Lungsod	115,105	9.68
Enzo Villafuerte	Hugpong ng Pagbabago	105,139	8.84
Carmelo Clarion	Hugpong sa Tawong Lungsod	98,804	8.31
Melba Principe	Hugpong sa Tawong Lungsod	87,633	7.37
Total		1,188,804	100.00
Total votes		220,029	–
Registered voters/turnout		282,739	77.82
Source: Commission on Elections

== Davao de Oro ==
=== Governor ===
Incumbent Governor Tyron Uy of Hugpong ng Pagbabago (HNP) ran for vice governor of Davao de Oro.

The HNP nominated Uy's father, provincial board member Arturo Uy, who was defeated by former Court of Appeals associate justice Dorothy Gonzaga of the Partido para sa Demokratikong Reporma. Tata Dondiego (Independent) also ran for governor.

Candidate	Party	Votes	%
Dorothy Gonzaga	Partido para sa Demokratikong Reporma	226,731	54.11
Arturo Uy	Hugpong ng Pagbabago	190,552	45.47
Tata Dondiego	Independent	1,744	0.42
Total		419,027	100.00
Total votes		446,526	–
Registered voters/turnout		508,221	87.86
Reporma gain from HNP			
Source: Commission on Elections

=== Vice Governor ===
Incumbent Vice Governor Maricar Zamora of Hugpong ng Pagbabago (HNP) ran for the House of Representatives in Davao de Oro's 1st legislative district.

The HNP nominated Davao de Oro governor Tyron Uy, who won the election against Alexander Agustin (Partido para sa Demokratikong Reporma).

Candidate	Party	Votes	%
Tyron Uy	Hugpong ng Pagbabago	224,048	61.83
Alexander Agustin	Partido para sa Demokratikong Reporma	138,301	38.17
Total		362,349	100.00
Total votes		446,526	–
Registered voters/turnout		508,221	87.86
HNP hold			
Source: Commission on Elections

=== Provincial Board ===
The Davao de Oro Provincial Board is composed of 14 board members, 10 of whom are elected.

Hugpong ng Pagbabago remained as the largest party in the provincial board with seven seats.

Party	Votes	%	Seats	+/–
Hugpong ng Pagbabago	922,439	66.95	7	–3
PDP–Laban	298,426	21.66	2	New
Partido para sa Demokratikong Reporma	30,905	2.24	0	New
Independent	126,107	9.15	1	+1
Total	1,377,877	100.00	10	0
Total votes	446,526	–		
Registered voters/turnout	508,221	87.86		

==== 1st district ====
Davao de Oro's 1st provincial district consists of the same area as Davao de Oro's 1st legislative district. Five board members are elected from this provincial district.

Nine candidates were included in the ballot.

Candidate	Party	Votes	%
Herv Zamora Apsay	Hugpong ng Pagbabago	108,580	18.28
Dyud Lopoz (incumbent)	Hugpong ng Pagbabago	94,543	15.92
Willy Ang	PDP–Laban	90,094	15.17
Renato Basañes (incumbent)	Hugpong ng Pagbabago	86,051	14.49
Eutropio Jayectin	Hugpong ng Pagbabago	80,409	13.54
Dante Varona	Hugpong ng Pagbabago	74,196	12.49
Catherine Calimpong	Independent	29,225	4.92
Wenz Villanueva	Partido para sa Demokratikong Reporma	20,406	3.44
Sorahya Prieto	Partido para sa Demokratikong Reporma	10,499	1.77
Total		594,003	100.00
Total votes		205,007	–
Registered voters/turnout		233,351	87.85
Source: Commission on Elections

==== 2nd district ====
Davao de Oro's 2nd provincial district consists of the same area as Davao de Oro's 2nd legislative district. Five board members are elected from this provincial district.

Eight candidates were included in the ballot.

Candidate	Party	Votes	%
Ruwina Gonzaga	PDP–Laban	120,560	15.38
Kris Caballero (incumbent)	Hugpong ng Pagbabago	110,652	14.12
Vinsay Secuya (incumbent)	Hugpong ng Pagbabago	98,705	12.59
Raul Caballero (incumbent)	Hugpong ng Pagbabago	97,475	12.44
Bebot Arancon	Independent	96,882	12.36
Cathy Uy-Pangay	Hugpong ng Pagbabago	89,558	11.43
Rafael Baquirel	PDP–Laban	87,772	11.20
Madel Malone-Cervantes	Hugpong ng Pagbabago	82,270	10.50
Total		783,874	100.00
Total votes		241,519	–
Registered voters/turnout		274,870	87.87
Source: Commission on Elections

== Davao del Norte ==
=== Governor ===
Incumbent Governor Edwin Jubahib of the Partido para sa Demokratikong Reporma ran for a second term. He was previously affiliated with PDP–Laban.

Jubahib won re-election against provincial board member Roy Catalan (Hugpong ng Pagbabago).

Candidate	Party	Votes	%
Edwin Jubahib (incumbent)	Partido para sa Demokratikong Reporma	310,947	60.61
Roy Catalan	Hugpong ng Pagbabago	202,112	39.39
Total		513,059	100.00
Total votes		577,781	–
Registered voters/turnout		690,248	83.71
Reporma hold			
Source: Commission on Elections

=== Vice Governor ===
Incumbent Vice Governor Rey Uy of Hugpong ng Pagbabago (HNP) ran for mayor of Tagum. He was previously affiliated with PDP–Laban.

The HNP nominated Uy's son, Oyo Uy, who won the election against provincial board member Franklin Gentiles (Partido para sa Demokratikong Reporma).

Candidate	Party	Votes	%
Oyo Uy (incumbent)	Hugpong ng Pagbabago	286,057	58.64
Franklin Gentiles	Partido para sa Demokratikong Reporma	201,737	41.36
Total		487,794	100.00
Total votes		577,781	–
Registered voters/turnout		690,248	83.71
HNP hold			
Source: Commission on Elections

=== Provincial Board ===
The Davao del Norte Provincial Board is composed of 14 board members, 10 of whom are elected.

Hugpong ng Pagbabago won seven seats, becoming the largest party in the provincial board.

Party	Votes	%	Seats	+/–
Hugpong ng Pagbabago	1,099,546	55.80	7	+4
Partido para sa Demokratikong Reporma	838,287	42.54	3	New
Independent	32,813	1.67	0	0
Total	1,970,646	100.00	10	0
Total votes	577,781	–		
Registered voters/turnout	690,248	83.71		

==== 1st district ====
Davao del Norte's 1st provincial district consists of the same area as Davao del Norte's 1st legislative district. Five board members are elected from this provincial district.

11 candidates were included in the ballot.

Candidate	Party	Votes	%
Nickel Suaybaguio	Partido para sa Demokratikong Reporma	129,039	12.92
Popo Estabillo	Partido para sa Demokratikong Reporma	117,917	11.81
Tete So (incumbent)	Hugpong ng Pagbabago	111,521	11.17
Shirley Belen Aala	Hugpong ng Pagbabago	101,346	10.15
Frank Remitar (incumbent)	Partido para sa Demokratikong Reporma	99,688	9.98
Boyet Gementiza	Hugpong ng Pagbabago	99,618	9.97
Enting Eliot	Hugpong ng Pagbabago	99,438	9.96
Bong Bermudez	Partido para sa Demokratikong Reporma	96,477	9.66
Roger Laguna (incumbent)	Partido para sa Demokratikong Reporma	86,377	8.65
Kid Libunao	Hugpong ng Pagbabago	51,837	5.19
Bong Pabalinas	Independent	5,514	0.55
Total		998,772	100.00
Total votes		281,364	–
Registered voters/turnout		337,583	83.35
Source: Commission on Elections

==== 2nd district ====
Davao del Norte's 2nd provincial district consists of the same area as Davao del Norte's 2nd legislative district. Five board members are elected from this provincial district.

13 candidates were included in the ballot.

Candidate	Party	Votes	%
Popop Catalan	Hugpong ng Pagbabago	146,840	15.11
Jannet Tanong (incumbent)	Hugpong ng Pagbabago	135,082	13.90
Orly Amit	Hugpong ng Pagbabago	121,847	12.54
Denise Marianne Lu	Hugpong ng Pagbabago	120,238	12.37
Mawe Pamisaran	Hugpong ng Pagbabago	111,779	11.50
Bong Andamon	Partido para sa Demokratikong Reporma	80,785	8.31
Dindo Parangan	Partido para sa Demokratikong Reporma	77,261	7.95
Demet Maligro	Partido para sa Demokratikong Reporma	51,645	5.31
Vic Barrios	Partido para sa Demokratikong Reporma	51,507	5.30
Boyang Osmic Micabani	Partido para sa Demokratikong Reporma	47,591	4.90
Kokong Solicar	Independent	13,289	1.37
Elmer Cejas	Independent	7,224	0.74
Antonio Arquio Jr.	Independent	6,786	0.70
Total		971,874	100.00
Total votes		296,417	–
Registered voters/turnout		352,665	84.05
Source: Commission on Elections

== Davao del Sur ==
=== Governor ===
Incumbent Governor Marc Douglas Cagas IV of the Nacionalista Party retired. He became governor on June 10, 2021, after Douglas Cagas died.

The Nacionalista Party nominated Cagas' wife, Yvonne Roña-Cagas, who won the election against Kiblawan mayor Jason Rama (Hugpong ng Pagbabago) and three other candidates.

Candidate	Party	Votes	%
Yvonne Roña-Cagas	Nacionalista Party	183,697	53.54
Bautista Rama	Hugpong ng Pagbabago	126,138	36.76
Bobbet Torreon	Independent	31,183	9.09
Daylen Villamor	Independent	1,223	0.36
Dolson Adlog	Independent	862	0.25
Total		343,103	100.00
Total votes		377,546	–
Registered voters/turnout		457,073	82.60
Nacionalista hold			
Source: Commission on Elections

=== Vice Governor ===
Incumbent Vice Governor John Tracy Cagas of the Nacionalista Party ran for the House of Representatives in Davao del Sur's lone legislative district.

The Nacionalista Party nominated Aiai Cagas-Fernandez, who won the election against provincial board member Jun Blanco Malaza (Hugpong ng Pagbabago) and Ronald Banac (Independent).

Candidate	Party	Votes	%
Aiai Cagas-Fernandez	Nacionalista Party	228,897	74.88
Jun Blanco Malaza	Hugpong ng Pagbabago	70,181	22.96
Ronald Banac	Independent	6,599	2.16
Total		305,677	100.00
Total votes		377,546	–
Registered voters/turnout		457,073	82.60
Nacionalista hold			
Source: Commission on Elections

=== Provincial Board ===
The Davao del Sur Provincial Board is composed of 14 board members, 10 of whom are elected.

The Nacionalista Party won seven seats, becoming the largest party in the provincial board.

Party	Votes	%	Seats	+/–
Nacionalista Party	606,562	48.79	7	+4
Hugpong ng Pagbabago	315,919	25.41	0	–4
PDP–Laban	84,440	6.79	1	New
PROMDI	59,928	4.82	1	New
Lakas–CMD	47,932	3.86	1	New
Aksyon Demokratiko	31,236	2.51	0	New
Partido para sa Demokratikong Reporma	5,876	0.47	0	New
Independent	91,312	7.34	0	–3
Total	1,243,205	100.00	10	0
Total votes	377,546	–		
Registered voters/turnout	457,073	82.60		

==== 1st district ====
Davao del Sur's 1st provincial district consists of the city of Digos and the municipalities of Bansalan and Santa Cruz. Five board members are elected from this provincial district.

21 candidates were included in the ballot.

Candidate	Party	Votes	%
Vic Cadungog	Nacionalista Party	71,703	11.31
Shiela Cagas	PROMDI	59,928	9.46
Simplicio Latasa (incumbent)	Nacionalista Party	58,385	9.21
Rey Ayo	PDP–Laban	57,523	9.08
Frank Tongcos	Nacionalista Party	55,234	8.72
Melot Garcia	Nacionalista Party	54,634	8.62
Raymond Llanos	Hugpong ng Pagbabago	54,181	8.55
Gilbert Mayor	Nacionalista Party	49,354	7.79
Marla Almendras	Independent	45,605	7.20
Dodong Molina	Hugpong ng Pagbabago	35,751	5.64
JR Rizada	PDP–Laban	26,917	4.25
Mon Pesiao	Hugpong ng Pagbabago	26,207	4.14
Jun Llanos Banlasan	Independent	12,244	1.93
Win Villapaz	Independent	8,192	1.29
Ruben Cañada	Partido para sa Demokratikong Reporma	5,876	0.93
Tony Neñez	Independent	2,684	0.42
Mar Decena	Independent	2,099	0.33
Emily Cabusog	Independent	2,012	0.32
May Spirit Villajos	Independent	1,957	0.31
Jun Barsalote	Independent	1,918	0.30
Angela Batiles	Independent	1,364	0.22
Total		633,768	100.00
Total votes		192,188	–
Registered voters/turnout		242,019	79.41
Source: Commission on Elections

==== 2nd district ====
Davao del Sur's 2nd provincial district consists of the municipalities of Hagonoy, Kiblawan, Magsaysay, Malalag, Matanao, Padada and Sulop. Five board members are elected from this provincial district.

16 candidates were included in the ballot.

Candidate	Party	Votes	%
Merlin Bello (incumbent)	Nacionalista	72,199	11.85
Carmelo delos Cientos III (incumbent)	Nacionalista	68,215	11.19
Anna Margarita Razonable (incumbent)	Nacionalista Party	66,278	10.88
Mark Joel Gallardo	Nacionalista Party	64,437	10.57
Lanier Cadungog (incumbent)	Lakas–CMD	47,932	7.86
Jhun Reyes	Nacionalista Party	46,123	7.57
Benjie Caminero	Hugpong ng Pagbabago	45,919	7.53
Glenn Duldulao	Hugpong ng Pagbabago	45,606	7.48
Elot Hernan	Hugpong ng Pagbabago	39,948	6.55
Rodrigo Sacedor	Hugpong ng Pagbabago	37,374	6.13
Indira Gan Abangan	Hugpong ng Pagbabago	30,933	5.08
Erick John Cabuslay	Aksyon Demokratiko	14,690	2.41
Helen Pasaol-Pinter	Aksyon Demokratiko	8,501	1.39
Jhonny Aguhar	Independent	8,131	1.33
Flordeliz Matas	Aksyon Demokratiko	8,045	1.32
Nonoy Fuentes	Independent	5,106	0.84
Total		609,437	100.00
Total votes		185,358	–
Registered voters/turnout		215,054	86.19
Source: Commission on Elections

== Davao Occidental ==
=== Governor ===
Incumbent Governor Claude Bautista of Hugpong ng Pagbabago ran for the House of Representatives in Davao Occidental's lone legislative district.

Bautista endorsed his brother, Davao Occidental vice governor Franklin Bautista (Lakas–CMD), who won the election unopposed.

Candidate	Party	Votes	%
Franklin Bautista	Lakas–CMD	102,421	100.00
Total		102,421	100.00
Total votes		148,753	–
Registered voters/turnout		192,420	77.31
Lakas gain from HNP			
Source: Commission on Elections

=== Vice Governor ===
Incumbent Vice Governor Franklin Bautista of Lakas–CMD ran for governor of Davao Occidental.

Lakas–CMD nominated Bautista's sister, representative Lorna Bautista-Bandigan, who won the election unopposed.

Candidate	Party	Votes	%
Lorna Bautista-Bandigan	Lakas–CMD	95,565	100.00
Total		95,565	100.00
Total votes		148,753	–
Registered voters/turnout		192,420	77.31
Lakas hold			
Source: Commission on Elections

=== Provincial Board ===
The Davao Occidental Provincial Board is composed of 11 board members, eight of whom are elected.

The Lakas–CMD won six seats, gaining a majority in the provincial board.

Party	Votes	%	Seats	+/–
Lakas–CMD	250,292	69.99	6	New
Partido Federal ng Pilipinas	7,635	2.13	0	New
Independent	99,685	27.88	2	+1
Total	357,612	100.00	8	0
Total votes	148,753	–		
Registered voters/turnout	192,420	77.31		

==== 1st district ====
Davao Occidental's 1st provincial district consists of the municipalities of Malita and Santa Maria. Four board members are elected from this provincial district.

Seven candidates were included in the ballot.

Candidate	Party	Votes	%
Brett Bautista	Lakas–CMD	60,282	27.81
Alberto Carlo Baliota	Lakas–CMD	47,019	21.69
Ali Colina Jr. (incumbent)	Lakas–CMD	38,532	17.78
Rogelio Baribar	Lakas–CMD	33,914	15.65
Bimbo Abe	Independent	23,829	10.99
Larry Matalandang	Independent	8,245	3.80
Dindo Hortel	Independent	4,948	2.28
Total		216,769	100.00
Total votes		87,224	–
Registered voters/turnout		103,950	83.91
Source: Commission on Elections

==== 2nd district ====
Davao Occidental's 2nd provincial district consists of the municipalities of Don Marcelino, Jose Abad Santos and Sarangani. Four board members are elected from this provincial district.

10 candidates were included in the ballot.

Candidate	Party	Votes	%
Jaja Joyce (incumbent)	Lakas–CMD	24,137	17.14
Vivencio Almano Jr. (incumbent)	Lakas–CMD	18,958	13.46
Danilo Omicas	Independent	18,437	13.09
Jay-ar Galias	Independent	17,754	12.61
Allen Lim (incumbent)	Lakas–CMD	15,985	11.35
Toto Cambalon	Independent	15,796	11.22
Alexander Uy (incumbent)	Lakas–CMD	11,465	8.14
Windy Grace Gomez	Independent	10,676	7.58
Louie Tayong	PFP	7,635	5.42
Total		140,843	100.00
Total votes		61,529	–
Registered voters/turnout		88,470	69.55
Source: Commission on Elections

== Davao Oriental ==
=== Governor ===
Incumbent Governor Nelson Dayanghirang of the Nacionalista Party ran for the House of Representatives in Davao Oriental's 1st legislative district.

The Nacionalista Party nominated representative Corazon Nuñez Malanyaon, who won the election unopposed.

Candidate	Party	Votes	%
Corazon Nuñez Malanyaon	Nacionalista Party	237,401	100.00
Total		237,401	100.00
Total votes		341,020	–
Registered voters/turnout		395,751	86.17
Nacionalista hold			
Source: Commission on Elections

=== Vice Governor ===
Incumbent Vice Governor Niño Uy of the Nacionalista Party ran for a third term.

Uy won re-election against Mati vice mayor Glenda Rabat-Gayta (PROMDI).

Candidate	Party	Votes	%
Niño Uy (incumbent)	Nacionalista Party	167,312	62.55
Glenda Rabat-Gayta	PROMDI	100,180	37.45
Total		267,492	100.00
Total votes		341,020	–
Registered voters/turnout		395,751	86.17
Nacionalista hold			
Source: Commission on Elections

=== Provincial Board ===
The Davao Oriental Provincial Board is composed of 14 board members, 10 of whom are elected.

The Nacionalista Party remained as the largest party with seven seats, but lost its majority.

Party	Votes	%	Seats	+/–
Nacionalista Party	682,544	62.91	7	–2
Hugpong ng Pagbabago	262,503	24.19	3	New
Independent	139,986	12.90	0	0
Total	1,085,033	100.00	10	0
Total votes	341,020	–		
Registered voters/turnout	395,751	86.17		

==== 1st district ====
Davao Oriental's 1st provincial district consists of the same area as Davao Oriental's 1st legislative district. Five board members are elected from this provincial district.

14 candidates were included in the ballot.

Candidate	Party	Votes	%
Nelson Dayanghirang Jr. (incumbent)	Nacionalista Party	80,631	18.54
Tata Nuñez	Nacionalista Party	74,546	17.14
Art Benjie Bulaong	Nacionalista Party	55,856	12.84
Nennette Palmera (incumbent)	Nacionalista Party	45,964	10.57
Andy Monday	Nacionalista Party	45,684	10.50
Louis Arturo Monday	Independent	42,814	9.84
Elijah Palma Gil	Independent	38,058	8.75
Bri Cruz	Independent	15,221	3.50
Karen Morales	Independent	14,213	3.27
Delfin Sulamin	Independent	9,543	2.19
Ramon Bantayan	Independent	4,355	1.00
Nonoy Masumpad	Independent	4,027	0.93
Lolito Juanillo	Independent	2,210	0.51
Arsenio Delagua	Independent	1,840	0.42
Total		434,962	100.00
Total votes		132,957	–
Registered voters/turnout		154,514	86.05
Source: Commission on Elections

==== 2nd district ====
Davao Oriental's 2nd provincial district consists of the same area as Davao Oriental's 2nd legislative district. Five board members are elected from this provincial district.

Nine candidates were included in the ballot.

Candidate	Party	Votes	%
Shella Go	Nacionalista Party	125,395	19.29
Harold Montes	Hugpong ng Pagbabago	94,940	14.60
Rotchie Ravelo	Hugpong ng Pagbabago	91,087	14.01
Daud Linsag	Hugpong ng Pagbabago	76,476	11.76
Popong Uy	Nacionalista Party	73,486	11.30
Annalouise Tambilawan	Nacionalista Party	72,160	11.10
Ruben Linsag	Nacionalista Party	58,816	9.05
Enrico Antopuesto (incumbent)	Nacionalista Party	50,006	7.69
Edwin Solatre	Independent	7,705	1.19
Total		650,071	100.00
Total votes		208,063	–
Registered voters/turnout		241,237	86.25
Source: Commission on Elections
