= 2022 Philippine local elections =

- May 9, 2022

All local elected offices above the barangay level
	First party	Second party	Third party
Party	PDP–Laban	Nacionalista	NPC
Governors	24 / 81	13 / 81	12 / 81
Vice governors	27 / 81	11 / 81	7 / 81
Board members	209 / 782	115 / 782	83 / 782
	Fourth party	Fifth party	Sixth party
Party	NUP	Lakas	Liberal
Governors	8 / 81	7 / 81	1 / 81
Vice governors	6 / 81	7 / 81	4 / 81
Board members	66 / 782	74 / 782	25 / 782
President of the Union of Local Authorities of the Philippines before election
Quirino Governor
Dakila Cua
PDP–Laban
Elected President of the Union of Local Authorities of the Philippines
South Cotabato Governor
Reynaldo Tamayo Jr.
PFP

Local elections in the Philippines took place on May 9, 2022. These were conducted together with the 2022 general election for national positions. All elected positions above the barangay (village) level but below the regional level were disputed. The following 18,180 positions will be disputed:

- 81 provincial governorships and vice-governorships
- 782 Provincial Board (Sangguniang Panlalawigan) members
- 1,634 mayorships and vice-mayorships
- 13,558 city and municipal councilors (Sangguniang Panlungsod and Sangguniang Bayan)

The elective positions in the Bangsamoro was originally scheduled to be held with these elections, but was originally postponed to 2025, concurrently with the 2025 elections. It was further postponed to be held on September 14, 2026.

The elective positions in the barangays won't be decided on this day as well. These will be held on October 30, 2023.

== Electoral system ==
Local government in the Philippines is governed by the Local Government Code of 1991. It is divided into autonomous regions, provinces, cities, municipalities and barangays. For elections on this day, all positions below the regional but above the barangay level, are disputed, with some exceptions.

Election slates of a governor, vice governor and Sangguniang Panlalawigan (for provinces), mayor, vice mayor and Sangguniang Panlungsod/Bayan (for cities and municipalities) are common. Provincial and city/municipal may cross-endorse each other. Slates may contain candidates from multiple parties. Positions are elected separately.

=== Executive positions ===
For governor, vice governor, mayor and vice mayor, voting is via first-past-the-post.

=== Legislative positions ===
For members of the Sangguniang Panlalawigan, Panlungsod and Bayan, voting is via the multiple non-transferable vote, where a voter has as many votes as there are positions, and can distribute it to how many candidates there are on the ballot.

Legislative positions which are designated Indigenous People's Mandatory Representation are not elected on this day, nor are barangay positions.

Ex officio seats in local legislatures are also not elected on this day. Philippine Councilors League seats on Sangguniang Panlalawigan are elected later.

== Provincial elections ==
There are 81 provinces of the Philippines. Compostela Valley, which had a successful renaming plebiscite in 2019, will be known as "Davao de Oro" starting this election. All provinces have a governor and vice governor, each elected separately. Each province is also divided into at least two provincial board districts that elect 1 to 7 board members.

Province	Governor	Vice Governor	Elected seats	Seats won									
Province	Governor	Vice Governor	Elected seats	PDP–Laban	NP	NPC	Lakas	NUP	LP	Aksyon	PFP	Others	Ind.
Abra	Asenso Abrenio	Asenso Abrenio	8									8 (Note: 8 seats for Asenso Abrenio.)	
Agusan del Norte	PDP–Laban	PDP–Laban	8	8									
Agusan del Sur	NUP	NUP	10					10					
Aklan	PDP–Laban	Nacionalista	10	4	4	2							
Albay	KANP	Aksyon	10	1	2		1	2	2			2 (Note: 1 seat for KANP and 1 seat for PROMDI.)	
Antique	NUP	NPC	10	3		4	1			1			1
Apayao	NPC	KBL	8	3		3							2
Aurora	PDP–Laban	PDP–Laban	8	2	1		1					4 (Note: 4 seats for LDP.)	
Basilan	PDP–Laban	PDP–Laban	8	6								2 (Note: 1 seat for Basilan Unity Party and 1 seat for UBJP.)	
Bataan	PDP–Laban	NUP	10	2	3		2	3					
Batanes	Liberal	Liberal	6			1	1		3			1 (Note: 1 seat for Reporma.)	
Batangas	PDP–Laban	PDP–Laban	12		10	1				1			
Benguet	PDP–Laban	Independent	10	2								7 (Note: 7 seats for United Benguet Party.)	1
Biliran	Nacionalista	Nacionalista	8		6		1			1			
Bohol	NPC	NPC	10	3	2	2		2		1			
Bukidnon	PRP	BPP	10		1							9 (Note: 9 seats for BPP.)	
Bulacan	NUP	NUP	12	6				6					
Cagayan	Nacionalista	PDP–Laban	10	1	1	2	3						3
Camarines Norte	Aksyon	Liberal	10	7				2	1				
Camarines Sur	PDP–Laban	PDP–Laban	10	7		3							
Camiguin	PDP–Laban	PDP–Laban	6	6									
Capiz	Lakas	Lakas	10	3			3		4				
Catanduanes	NPC	PDP–Laban	8	1		1	4					1 (Note: 1 seat for Reporma.)	1
Cavite	NUP	NUP	16			1	3	11				1 (Note: 1 seat for UNA.)	
Cebu	One Cebu	Liberal	14	2	2	1		3				4 (Note: 4 seats for One Cebu.)	2
Cotabato	Nacionalista	PDP–Laban	10	3	6		1						
Davao de Oro	Reporma	HNP	10	2								7 (Note: 7 seats for Hugpong ng Pagbabago.)	1
Davao del Norte	Reporma	HNP	10									10 (Note: 7 seats for Hugpong ng Pagbabago and 3 seats for Reporma.)	
Davao del Sur	Nacionalista	Nacionalista	10	1	7		1					1 (Note: 1 seat for PROMDI.)	
Davao Occidental	Lakas	Lakas	8				6						2
Davao Oriental	Nacionalista	Nacionalista	10		7							3 (Note: 3 seats for Hugpong ng Pagbabago.)	
Dinagat Islands	Lakas	Lakas	8				6		2				
Eastern Samar	PDP–Laban	PDP–Laban	10	8						1		1 (Note: 1 seat for PDDS.)	
Guimaras	NUP	PDP–Laban	8	5				3					
Ifugao	KBL	Liberal	8						2			1 (Note: 1 seat for KBL.)	5
Ilocos Norte	Nacionalista	Nacionalista	10	1	8								1
Ilocos Sur	NPC	Bileg Party	10			6						4 (Note: 3 seats for Bileg Party and 1 seat for KBL.)	
Iloilo	NUP	Nacionalista	10		4		2	2	1	1			
Isabela	PDP–Laban	PDP–Laban	12	3	1	2	2			2	1	1 (Note: 1 seat for LDP.)	
Kalinga	Lakas	Aksyon	8	4	2					1		1 (Note: 1 seat for Reporma.)	
La Union	PDDS	Independent	10		1	5	2		1		1		
Laguna	PDP–Laban	PDP–Laban	10	4	1		1	1		3			
Lanao del Norte	PDP–Laban	PDP–Laban	10	10									
Lanao del Sur	Lakas	Lakas	10	2			7			1			
Leyte	PDP–Laban	PDP–Laban	10	8				1	1				
Maguindanao	Nacionalista	Nacionalista	10		8							2 (Note: 2 seats for UBJP.)	
Marinduque	PDP–Laban	PDP–Laban	8	7									1
Masbate	PDP–Laban	PDP–Laban	10	10									
Misamis Occidental	Nacionalista	PDP–Laban	10	2	1							7 (Note: 7 seats for Asenso Pinoy.)	
Misamis Oriental	Lakas	Padayon; Pilipino	10				3	3				4 (Note: 4 seats for Padayon Pilipino.)	
Mountain Province	PDP–Laban	PDP–Laban	8	4	2							1 (Note: 1 seat for LDP.)	1
Negros Occidental	NPC	NUP	12	1		6		2				2 (Note: 2 seats for United Negros Alliance.)	1
Negros Oriental	NPC	NPC	10		2	4	1		2				1
Northern Samar	NUP	NUP	10					9	1				
Nueva Ecija	Unang Sigaw	Unang Sigaw	10	3								7 (Note: 7 seats for Unang Sigaw.)	
Nueva Vizcaya	Nacionalista	Lakas	10		4		4			1	1		
Occidental Mindoro	PDDS	PDDS	10		1		1		3			5 (Note: 5 seats for PDDS.)	
Oriental Mindoro	PDP–Laban	PDP–Laban	10	3					1		1	5 (Note: 5 seats for Mindoro Bago Sarili.)	
Palawan	PPPL	PPPL	10	2			1	1		2		4 (Note: 3 seats for Partidong Pagbabago ng Palawan and 1 seat for PRP.)	
Pampanga	NPC	Kambilan	10		1	4				1		4 (Note: 4 seats for Kambilan.)	
Pangasinan	Nacionalista	Lakas	12		2			2				8 (Note: 8 seats for Abante Pangasinan-Ilokano Party.)	
Quezon	NPC	NPC	10		2	7		1					
Quirino	PDDS	PDP–Laban	8	2	2	1			1			1 (Note: 1 seat for Reporma.)	1
Rizal	NPC	PFP	10	1		8		1					
Romblon	PDP–Laban	PDP–Laban	8	3	5								
Samar	Nacionalista	Nacionalista	10		10								
Sarangani	PCM	PCM	10									10 (Note: 10 seats for PCM.)	
Siquijor	NPC	NPC	6	5						1			
Sorsogon	NPC	NPC	10			10							
South Cotabato	PFP	PFP	10	3							7		
Southern Leyte	PDP–Laban	PDP–Laban	8	8									
Sultan Kudarat	Lakas	Lakas	10				10						
Sulu	PDP–Laban	PDP–Laban	10	10									
Surigao del Norte	Nacionalista	PDP–Laban	10	8	2								
Surigao del Sur	PDP–Laban	Hugpong; Surigao Party	10	6								4 (Note: 4 seats for Hugpong Surigao Party.)	
Tarlac	NPC	NPC	10			9							1
Tawi-Tawi	Tawi-Tawi; One Party	Tawi-Tawi; One Party	8					1				7 (Note: 7 seats for Tawi-Tawi One Party.)	
Zambales	SZP	Aksyon	10								1	9 (Note: 8 seats for Sulong Zambales Party and 1 seat for WPP.)	
Zamboanga del Norte	Nacionalista	PDP–Laban	10	9	1								
Zamboanga del Sur	PDP–Laban	PDP–Laban	10	4								5 (Note: 2 seats for UNA, 2 seats for PDDS and 1 seat for Partido Pilipino sa Pagbabago.)	1
Zamboanga Sibugay	PDP–Laban	Nacionalista	10		3		6					1 (Note: 1 seat for LDP.)	
Total			782	209	115	83	74	66	25	17	12	155	26

== City elections ==
There are 146 cities of the Philippines. Santo Tomas, Batangas is the newest city and will elect city officials for the first time in this election. All cities have a mayor and vice mayor, each elected separately. Each city also elects 6 to 12 councilors, mostly at-large, although some are divided into council districts.

=== Highly urbanized cities ===
City	Mayor	Vice Mayor	Elected seats	Seats won									
City	Mayor	Vice Mayor	Elected seats	PDP–Laban	NP	NPC	NUP	Lakas	Aksyon	LP	PFP	Others	Ind.
Angeles City	Kambilan	Kambilan	10									10 (Note: 7 seats for Kambilan, 2 seats for Partido Abe Kapampangan and 1 seat for PROMDI.)	
Bacolod	PDP–Laban	Nacionalista	12	3	4	2		1				1 (Note: 1 seat for PROMDI.)	1
Baguio	NPC	Nacionalista	12		2	1		1		4	1	1 (Note: 1 seat for Partido Pederal ng Maharlika.)	2
Butuan	Nacionalista	Nacionalista	10		6		1	2					1
Cagayan de Oro	NUP	CDP	16	1			9					6 (Note: 4 seats for Padayon Pilipino and 2 seats for CDP.)	
Caloocan	PDP–Laban	Nacionalista	18	2	10		1	2	3				
Cebu City	PDP–Laban	PDP–Laban	16	9								4 (Note: 4 seats for LDP.)	3
Davao City	HNP	HTL	24									23 (Note: 13 seats for Hugpong ng Pagbabago and 10 seats for Hugpong sa Tawong Lungsod.)	1
General Santos	PCM	PDP–Laban	12	5	1							6 (Note: 3 seats for PCM, 2 seats for AIM and 1 seat for Regional Communities Reforms Initiatives.)	
Iligan	Nacionalista	Nacionalista	12	3	7		1					1 (Note: 1 seat for UNA.)	
Iloilo City	NUP	NUP	12				10					2 (Note: 1 seat for LDP and 1 seat for PROMDI.)	
Lapu-Lapu City	PDP–Laban	PDP–Laban	12	12									
Las Piñas	Nacionalista	Nacionalista	12		8	1			1				2
Lucena	PDP–Laban	PDP–Laban	10	6		1				1		1 (Note: 1 seat for PROMDI.)	1
Makati	Makatizens; United Party	Makatizens; United Party	16									16 (Note: 15 seats for Makatizens United Party and 1 seat for Reform.)	
Malabon	Nacionalista	NUP	12		3	2	2		2	2		1 (Note: 1 seat for UNA.)	
Mandaluyong	PDP–Laban	PDP–Laban	12	8	1				1				2
Mandaue	PDP–Laban	PDP–Laban	10	10									
Manila	Asenso Manileño	Asenso Manileño	36									34 (Note: 34 seats for Asenso Manileño.)	2
Marikina	UNA	UNA	16							2		14 (Note: 14 seats for UNA.)	
Muntinlupa	One Muntinlupa	One Muntinlupa	16									16 (Note: 16 seats for One Muntinlupa.)	
Navotas	Partido Navoteño	Partido Navoteño	12									12 (Note: 12 seats for Partido Navoteño.)	
Olongapo	Nacionalista	Independent	10	1	6				1			1 (Note: 1 seat for KANP.)	1
Parañaque	PDP–Laban	Liberal	16	11		1		1	1			1 (Note: 1 seat for LDP.)	1
Pasay	PDP–Laban	LDP	12	11							1		
Pasig	Aksyon	Aksyon	12		1	8			2			1 (Note: 1 seat for PDDS.)	
Puerto Princesa	PDP–Laban	Aksyon	10	9									1
Quezon City	Serbisyo sa Bayan	Serbisyo sa Bayan	36	1	3	1		5				26 (Note: 25 seats for Serbisyo sa Bayan and 1 seat for Filipino Rights Protection Advocates of Manila Movement.)	
San Juan	PDP–Laban	PDP–Laban	12	12									
Tacloban	Nacionalista	Aksyon	10	6					2			2 (Note: 1 seat for KANP and 1 seat for Tingog Sinirangan.)	
Taguig	Nacionalista	Nacionalista	16		16								
Valenzuela	NPC	NPC	12			10		1			1		
Zamboanga City	PRP	Prosperidad y Amor para na Zamboanga	16					1				15 (Note: 6 seats for LDP, 3 seats for UNA, 3 seats for Partido Prosperidad y Amor para na Zamboanga, 2 seats for Adelante Zamboanga Party and 1 seat for PRP.)	
Total			480	110	68	27	24	14	13	9	3	194	18

=== Independent component cities ===
City	Mayor	Vice Mayor	Elected seats	Seats won							
City	Mayor	Vice Mayor	Elected seats	PDP–Laban	LP	UBJP	NP	Aksyon	KANP	Lakas	NPC
Cotabato City	UBJP	UBJP	10			9					1
Dagupan	Aksyon	Aksyon	10				7	2	1		
Naga (Bicol)	Liberal	Liberal	10		10						
Ormoc	PDP–Laban	PDP–Laban	10	10							
Santiago	PDP–Laban	PDP–Laban	10	6	2			1		1	
Total			50	16	12	9	7	3	1	1	1

=== Component cities ===
==== Region I (Ilocos Region) ====
City	Mayor	Vice Mayor	Elected seats	Seats won								
City	Mayor	Vice Mayor	Elected seats	NP	NPC	API	Lakas	PDP–Laban	Aksyon	KANP	Reporma	Ind.
Alaminos, Pangasinan	Nacionalista	Nacionalista	10	9		1						
Batac, Ilocos Norte	Nacionalista	Nacionalista	10		8						1	1
Candon, Ilocos Sur	NPC	NPC	10	8								2
Laoag, Ilocos Norte	Independent	PDP–Laban	10	5				5				
San Carlos, Pangasinan	Abante; Pangasinan- Ilokano	Abante; Pangasinan- Ilokano	10		2	8						
San Fernando, La Union	Independent	NPC	12	3	3					2		4
Urdaneta, Pangasinan	Lakas	Lakas	10				7		2			1
Vigan, Ilocos Sur	NPC	NPC	10	6	3							1
Total			82	31	16	9	7	5	2	2	1	9

==== Cordillera Administrative Region ====
City	Mayor	Vice Mayor	Elected seats	Seats won			
City	Mayor	Vice Mayor	Elected seats	NP	LDP	KBL	Ind.
Tabuk, Kalinga	LDP	Independent	10	4	4	1	1
Total			10	4	4	1	1

==== Region II (Cagayan Valley) ====
City	Mayor	Vice Mayor	Elected seats	Seats won					
City	Mayor	Vice Mayor	Elected seats	NP	NPC	LP	PDP–Laban	Aksyon	Ind.
Cauayan, Isabela	NPC	Reporma	10		10				
Ilagan, Isabela	Nacionalista	Nacionalista	10	10					
Tuguegarao, Cagayan	Liberal	NPC	12	7		2	1	1	1
Total			32	17	10	2	1	1	1

==== Region III (Central Luzon) ====
City	Mayor	Vice Mayor	Elected seats	Seats won									
City	Mayor	Vice Mayor	Elected seats	PDP–Laban	NPC	Aksyon	NUP	AR	Kmbln.	LP	PROMDI	Others	Ind.
Balanga, Bataan	PDP–Laban	PDP–Laban	10	10									
Cabanatuan, Nueva Ecija	PDP–Laban	PDP–Laban	10	10									
Gapan, Nueva Ecija	PDP–Laban	PDP–Laban	10	10									
Mabalacat, Pampanga	NPC	NPC	10		10								
Malolos, Bulacan	PDP–Laban	Aksyon	10	1		4	5						
Meycauayan, Bulacan	PDP–Laban	PDP–Laban	10	9									1
Muñoz, Nueva Ecija	People's Empowerment sa Lungsod Agham	People's Empowerment sa Lungsod Agham	10	6								4 (Note: 4 seats for People's Empowerment sa Lungsod Agham.)	
Palayan, Nueva Ecija	PDP–Laban	Lakas	10	10									
San Fernando, Pampanga	PDP–Laban	Kambilan	10	1		3			4	1			1
San Jose, Nueva Ecija	Unang Sigaw ng Nueva Ecija	Unang Sigaw ng Nueva Ecija	10	4								6 (Note: 6 seats for Unang Sigaw ng Nueva Ecija.)	
San Jose del Monte, Bulacan	PDP–Laban	Arangkada; San Joseño	12				1	6		2	1	1 (Note: 1 seat for Partido Pederal ng Maharlika.)	1
Tarlac City	NPC	NPC	10		8						1		1
Total			122	61	18	7	6	6	4	3	2	11	4

==== Region IV-A (Calabarzon) ====
City	Mayor	Vice Mayor	Elected seats	Seats won									
City	Mayor	Vice Mayor	Elected seats	NUP	NP	PDP–Laban	Lakas	NPC	Aksyon	LP	PRP	Others	Ind.
Antipolo, Rizal	NPC	NPC	16	8		1		6		1			
Bacoor, Cavite	Nacionalista	NPC	12		5		5	2					
Batangas City	Nacionalista	Nacionalista	12		12								
Biñan, Laguna	PDP–Laban	PDP–Laban	12		1	11							
Cabuyao, Laguna	Aksyon	Lakas	10						10				
Calamba, Laguna	PDP–Laban	PDP–Laban	12		10	2							
Cavite City	Lakas	Lakas	10	1			9						
Dasmariñas, Cavite	NUP	NUP	12	12									
General Trias, Cavite	NUP	NUP	12	12									
Imus, Cavite	NUP	NUP	12	10						1		1 (Note: 1 seat for Reporma.)	
Lipa, Batangas	Nacionalista	Reporma	12		12								
San Pablo, Laguna	Nacionalista	Nacionalista	10		9								1
San Pedro, Laguna	Lakas	Lakas	12		2	2	7					1 (Note: 1 seat for KANP.)	
Santa Rosa, Laguna	PDP–Laban	PDP–Laban	12			11							1
Santo Tomas, Batangas	Aksyon	Aksyon	10		1			3	2		1	3 (Note: 2 seats for UNA and 1 seat for PFP.)	1
Tagaytay, Cavite	NUP	NUP	10	8								2 (Note: 2 seats for UNIDO.)	
Tanauan, Batangas	NPC	PDDS	10					3		1		6 (Note: 6 seats for PDDS.)	
Tayabas, Quezon	Nacionalista	Nacionalista	10					5		4	1		
Trece Martires, Cavite	NUP	NUP	10	10									
Total			212	61	51	24	21	19	12	7	2	12	3

==== Mimaropa ====
City	Mayor	Vice Mayor	Elected seats	Seats won	
City	Mayor	Vice Mayor	Elected seats	MBS	Aksyon
Calapan, Oriental Mindoro	Aksyon	Aksyon	10	8	2
Total			10	8	2

==== Region V (Bicol Region) ====
City	Mayor	Vice Mayor	Elected seats	Seats won							
City	Mayor	Vice Mayor	Elected seats	PDP–Laban	NPC	NUP	LP	KANP	Aksyon	Others	Ind.
Iriga, Camarines Sur	PDP–Laban	PDP–Laban	10	5	2				3		
Legazpi, Albay	KANP	KANP	10				1	6		2 (Note: 1 seat for Nacionalista and 1 seat for NPC.)	1
Ligao, Albay	NUP	NUP	10			10					
Masbate City	PDP–Laban	PDP–Laban	10	9							1
Sorsogon City	PDP–Laban	PDP–Laban	12		10						2
Tabaco, Albay	Liberal	Liberal	10				8			2 (Note: 1 seat for Lakas–CMD and 1 seat for Kusog Bikolandia.)	
Total			62	14	12	10	9	6	3	4	4

==== Region VI (Western Visayas) ====
City	Mayor	Vice Mayor	Elected seats	Seats won								
City	Mayor	Vice Mayor	Elected seats	PDP–Laban	NPC	NUP	Lakas	UNEGA	PDDS	Aksyon	Others	Ind.
Bago, Negros Occidental	NPC	NPC	10		5	2			3			
Cadiz, Negros Occidental	PDP–Laban	PDP–Laban	10	4		3	2		1			
Escalante, Negros Occidental	NPC	NPC	10	9			1					
Himamaylan, Negros Occidental	UNEGA	UNEGA	10					8	1			1
Kabankalan, Negros Occidental	PDDS	Aksyon	10		9							1
La Carlota, Negros Occidental	Liberal	NUP	10	2		5	1				1 (Note: 1 seat for PROMDI.)	1
Passi, Iloilo	Nacionalista	Lakas	10				5				4 (Note: 4 seats for Nacionalista.)	1
Roxas, Capiz	Liberal	Liberal	10	2							8 (Note: 8 seats for Liberal.)	
Sagay, Negros Occidental	NUP	NUP	10	2		3	3				2 (Note: 2 seats for Reporma.)	
San Carlos, Negros Occidental	NPC	NPC	10		10							
Silay, Negros Occidental	Independent	PDP–Laban	10	7		1		1		1		
Sipalay, Negros Occidental	NPC	NPC	10		9	1				1		
Talisay, Negros Occidental	PDP–Laban	PDP–Laban	10	6			2					2
Victorias, Negros Occidental	Independent	PDP–Laban	10	9								1
Total			140	41	33	15	14	9	5	2	11	7

==== Region VII (Central Visayas) ====
City	Mayor	Vice Mayor	Elected seats	Seats won									
City	Mayor	Vice Mayor	Elected seats	NP	NPC	1CEBU	BAKUD	PPP	LP	NUP	PDP–Laban	Others	Ind.
Bais, Negros Oriental	NPC	NPC	10		10								
Bayawan, Negros Oriental	NPC	NPC	10	1	9								
Bogo, Cebu	Partido Pilipino sa Pagbabago	Partido Pilipino sa Pagbabago	10					9					1
Canlaon, Negros Oriental	NPC	Independent	10	2	3				5				
Carcar, Cebu	One Cebu	One Cebu	10	4		6							
Danao, Cebu	Partido Pilipino sa Pagbabago	BAKUD	10				10						
Dumaguete, Negros Oriental	Liberal	NPC	10		1				4			4 (Note: 3 seats for PROMDI and 1 seat for Lakas–CMD.)	1
Guihulngan, Negros Oriental	Nacionalista	Nacionalista	10	10									
Naga, Cebu	Nacionalista	Nacionalista	10	9									1
Tagbilaran, Bohol	NUP	NUP	10							6	3	1 (Note: 1 seat for LDP.)	
Talisay, Cebu	Nacionalista	Nacionalista	10	10									
Tanjay, Negros Oriental	Independent	NPC	10		8								2
Toledo, Cebu	One Cebu	One Cebu	10			9							1
Total			130	36	31	15	10	9	9	6	3	5	6

==== Region VIII (Eastern Visayas) ====
City	Mayor	Vice Mayor	Elected seats	Seats won					
City	Mayor	Vice Mayor	Elected seats	PDP–Laban	NP	NPC	LP	Lakas	Ind.
Baybay, Leyte	PDP–Laban	Independent	10	9					1
Borongan, Eastern Samar	PDP–Laban	PDP–Laban	10	8		1			1
Calbayog, Samar	Nacionalista	NPC	12		11		1		
Catbalogan, Samar	Nacionalista	Nacionalista	10		10				
Maasin, Southern Leyte	Nacionalista	Lakas	10	8				1	1
Total			52	25	21	1	1	1	3

==== Region IX (Zamboanga Peninsula) ====
City	Mayor	Vice Mayor	Elected seats	Seats won									
City	Mayor	Vice Mayor	Elected seats	PDP–Laban	APP	NP	LP	BUP	PPP	PDDS	PFP	UNA	Ind.
Dapitan, Zamboanga del Norte	Nacionalista	APP	10		6	4							
Dipolog, Zamboanga del Norte	PDP–Laban	PDP–Laban	10	10									
Isabela, Basilan	BUP	PDP–Laban	10	3			4	2					1
Pagadian, Zamboanga del Sur	PDP–Laban	NUP	10	4					2	2	1	1	
Total			40	17	6	4	4	2	2	2	1	1	1

==== Region X (Northern Mindanao) ====
City	Mayor	Vice Mayor	Elected seats	Seats won								
City	Mayor	Vice Mayor	Elected seats	NP	NUP	PDP–Laban	ASPIN	BPP	Padayon	CDP	Lakas	Ind.
El Salvador, Misamis Oriental	NUP	NUP	10		9					1		
Gingoog, Misamis Oriental	Lakas	NUP	10	5	1				3		1	
Malaybalay, Bukidnon	BPP	Nacionalista	10	7				3				
Oroquieta, Misamis Occidental	Nacionalista	Nacionalista	10	10								
Ozamiz, Misamis Occidental	PDP–Laban	PDP–Laban	10	3		3	4					
Tangub, Misamis Occidental	Nacionalista	PDP–Laban	10	3		4	3					
Valencia, Bukidnon	BPP	Nacionalista	10	4		1		4				1
Total			70	32	10	8	7	7	3	1	1	1

==== Region XI (Davao Region) ====
City	Mayor	Vice Mayor	Elected seats	Seats won						
City	Mayor	Vice Mayor	Elected seats	HNP	PDP–Laban	NP	Reporma	PROMDI	PFP	Ind.
Digos, Davao del Sur	Nacionalista	Nacionalista	10		1	9				
Mati, Davao Oriental	Independent	HNP	10		2			2		6
Panabo, Davao del Norte	Reporma	HNP	10	7			2			1
Samal, Davao del Norte	PDP–Laban	Independent	12		7				2	3
Tagum, Davao del Norte	HNP	Reporma	10	7			3			
Total			52	14	10	9	5	2	2	9

==== Region XII (Soccsksargen) ====
City	Mayor	Vice Mayor	Elected seats	Seats won				
City	Mayor	Vice Mayor	Elected seats	PDP–Laban	NP	Lakas	PFP	NPC
Kidapawan, Cotabato	Nacionalista	Independent	10	3	7			
Koronadal, South Cotabato	PDP–Laban	Independent	10	6			4	
Tacurong, Sultan Kudarat	Lakas	Nacionalista	10		1	7		2
Total			30	9	8	7	4	2

==== Region XIII (Caraga) ====
City	Mayor	Vice Mayor	Elected seats	Seats won			
City	Mayor	Vice Mayor	Elected seats	PDP–Laban	NUP	NP	Lakas
Bayugan, Agusan del Sur	NUP	NUP	10		10		
Bislig, Surigao del Sur	PDP–Laban	Lakas	10	8			2
Cabadbaran, Agusan del Norte	PDP–Laban	PDP–Laban	10	10			
Surigao City, Surigao del Norte	Nacionalista	Nacionalista	10	6		4	
Tandag, Surigao del Sur	PDP–Laban	PDP–Laban	10	10			
Total			50	34	10	4	2

==== Bangsamoro ====
City	Mayor	Vice Mayor	Elected seats	Seats won	
City	Mayor	Vice Mayor	Elected seats	PDP–Laban	Ind.
Lamitan, Basilan	PDP–Laban	UNA	10	7	3
Marawi, Lanao del Sur	PDP–Laban	PDP–Laban	10	8	2
Total			20	15	5

== Municipal elections ==
There are 1,489 municipalities of the Philippines. All municipalities have a mayor and vice mayor, each elected separately. Each municipality also elects 8 councilors at-large, except for Pateros, which elects six councilors in each of its two council districts.

=== Municipality ===
==== Metro Manila ====
Municipality	Mayor	Vice Mayor	Elected seats	Seats won		
Municipality	Mayor	Vice Mayor	Elected seats	Aksyon	NP	PPP
Pateros	Aksyon	Nacionalista	12	6	4	2
Total			12	6	4	2

==== Other Municipalities ====
10 Most Populous Municipalities in the Philippines (2020 census)
Municipality	Mayor	Vice Mayor	Elected seats	Seats won									
Municipality	Mayor	Vice Mayor	Elected seats	NPC	PDP–Laban	NUP	Kmbln.	NP	Aksyon	UNIDO	Akbayan	Lakas	Ind.
Binangonan, Rizal	NPC	NPC	8	6									2
Cainta, Rizal	NPC	NPC	8	8									
Lubao, Pampanga	Kambilan	Kambilan	8				7						1
Marilao, Bulacan	PDP–Laban	PDP–Laban	8		5	1			1				1
Rodriguez, Rizal	PDP–Laban	NPC	8	4	3					1			
San Mateo, Rizal	Liberal	NPC	8	1	7								
Santa Maria, Bulacan	Aksyon	Liberal	8		4	1			3				
Silang, Cavite	NUP	NUP	8	3		3				1		1	
Tanza, Cavite	NUP	NUP	8			8							
Taytay, Rizal	NPC	PDP–Laban	8	2				5			1		
Total			80	24	19	13	7	5	4	2	1	1	4

== See also ==
Results of the 2022 Philippine local elections in:

- Metro Manila
- Cordillera Administrative Region
- Ilocos Region
- Cagayan Valley
- Central Luzon
- Calabarzon
- Mimaropa
- Bicol Region
- Western Visayas
- Central Visayas
- Eastern Visayas
- Zamboanga Peninsula
- Northern Mindanao
- Davao Region
- Soccsksargen
- Caraga
- Bangsamoro
