= 2019 Compostela Valley name change plebiscite =

- December 7, 2019
- Do you agree to change the name of the province of Compostela Valley to the province of Davao de Oro pursuant to Republic Act number 11297? Filipino: Pumapayag ka ba na palitan ang pangalan ng lalawigan ng Compostela Valley at gawing lalawigan ng Davao de Oro alinsunod sa Batas Republika bilang 11297?
- Outcome: Compostela Valley renamed into "Davao de Oro"

Results
Choice	Votes	%
Yes	174,442	97.20%
No	5,020	2.80%
Valid votes	179,462	99.73%
Invalid or blank votes	491	0.27%
Total votes	179,953	100.00%
Registered voters/turnout	410,262	43.86%
- Results by municipality and legislative district

On December 7, 2019, a plebiscite was held in the province of Compostela Valley, Philippines, to determine whether its residents approved renaming the province to Davao de Oro.

== Background ==
The province of Compostela Valley was carved out from Davao del Norte in 1998. In early 2019, Republic Act No. 11297 was passed into law renaming Compostela Valley to Davao de Oro, subject to the province's residents' approval in a plebiscite. The legislation was signed into law by President Rodrigo Duterte on April 17, 2019 and the signing was made known to the public on May 23, 2019. The Philippine national government's Commission on Elections (Comelec) was tasked to supervise and conduct the required plebiscite.

Republic Act No. 11297 was proposed as House Bill 7363, which was filed before the House of Representatives on May 15, 2018, and Senate Bill 1746, which was filed before the Senate on December 10, 2018. Representatives Pedro Acharon Jr., Ruwel Peter Gonzaga, and Maria Carmen Zamora were the proponents of HB 7363 and Senators Migz Zubiri and Sonny Angara were the proponents of the Senate counterpart of the House bill. The two proposed bills were consolidated on January 29, 2019. Supporters of the renaming said that renaming Compostela Valley to Davao de Oro would strengthen the association of the province with the rest of the Davao Region; prior to the plebiscite, Davao de Oro as Compostela Valley was the only province in the region without "Davao" in its name.

As per Resolution No. 10614 of Comelec, all voters in the 11 municipalities of Compostela Valley who voted in the 2019 Philippine general election were eligible to participate.

== Preparations ==
=== Campaign ===
Since March 2019, the provincial government of Compostela Valley led by governor Jayvee Tyron Uy started the campaign to convince voters to approve the renaming of their province. Jayvee Uy's campaign was helped by Arturo Uy, his father and a former governor of his province. The proposed name of "Davao de Oro" was formally launched on March 8, 2019 during the Bulawan Festival.

=== Organization ===
Polling for the plebiscite was scheduled to run from 7 a.m. to 3 p.m. on December 7, 2019. ₱54 million was allocated for the conduct of the plebiscite. President Rodrigo Duterte also directed the police and the military to ensure the security of the province during the plebiscite. A province-wide gun ban was imposed in Compostela Valley from November 7 to December 7, 2019 and at least one police checkpoint was set up in each of the province's 11 municipalities.

=== Question ===
The question used in the ballot was in Filipino and voters were asked to vote either "yes" or "no". The question was:

"Pumapayag ka ba na palitan ang pangalan ng lalawigan ng Compostela Valley at gawing lalawigan ng Davao de Oro
alinsunod sa Batas Republika bilang 11297?"
transl.
Do you approve of the change of the name of the
Province of Compostela Valley to Province of Davao de Oro
by virtue of Republic Act No. 11297?

Voters wrote "yes" or "no" or its equivalent in Filipino.

== Results ==
The results of the plebiscite were counted manually and submitted to the Provincial Plebiscite Board of Canvassers.

According to COMELEC, the turnout was around 45 percent, with 178,953 participants out of 410,262 eligible voters. The majority favored the renaming, with 174,442 voting "yes" and 5,020 voting "no". Canvassing was slowed due to inconsistencies in the vote counts from four municipalities. The results were approved by COMELEC at 10:24 p.m. on December 8, 2019.

Are you in favor of renaming Compostela Valley into "Davao de Oro"?
Choice	Votes	%
For	174,442	97.20
Against	5,020	2.80
Required majority		50.00
Total	179,462	100.00
Valid votes	179,462	99.73
Invalid/blank votes	491	0.27
Total votes	179,953	100.00
Registered voters/turnout	410,261	43.86
Source: Manila Bulletin

=== By municipality ===
The measure was accepted by overwhelming margins in all municipalities, with Compostela having the largest proportion of "no" votes.

Municipality	Yes		No		Valid votes		Invalid votes		Turnout		Registered voters
Municipality	Total	%	Total	%	Total	%	Total	%	Total	%	Registered voters
Compostela	21,787	94.26	1,326	5.74	23,113	99.66	80	0.34	23,193	45.74	50,705
Laak	21,370	98.37	355	1.63	21,725	99.62	82	0.38	21,807	50.03	43,590
Mabini	9,270	97.9	199	2.1	9,469	99.28	69	0.72	9,538	40.93	23,306
Maco	18,464	98.17	345	1.83	18,809	100	0	0	18,809	41.75	45,051
Maragusan	16,364	98.87	187	1.13	16,551	99.81	31	0.13	16,582	47.53	34,887
Mawab	10,137	98.5	154	1.5	10,291	99.76	25	0.24	10,316	45.48	22,682
Monkayo	17,499	96.42	650	3.58	18,149	99.57	79	0.43	18,228	36.82	49,511
Montevista	12,367	97.93	261	2.07	12,628	100	0	0	12,628	49.73	25,394
Nabunturan	18,209	96.57	646	3.43	18,855	99.7	57	0.3	18,912	45.91	41,194
New Bataan	13,434	96.56	478	3.44	13,912	99.51	68	0.49	13,980	49.39	28,305
Pantukan	15,541	97.37	419	2.63	15,960	100	0	0	15,960	34.97	45,636
Compostela Valley	174,442	97.2	5,020	2.8	179,462	99.73	491	0.27	179,953	43.86	410,261

=== By legislative district ===
Likewise, the measure was accepted in both legislative districts of Compostela Valley.

District	Yes		No		Valid votes		Invalid votes		Turnout		Registered voters
District	Total	%	Total	%	Total	%	Total	%	Total	%	Registered voters
1st district	81,451	96.56	2,902	3.44	84,353	99.7	258	0.3	84,611	44.81	188,802
2nd district	92,991	97.77	2,118	2.63	95,109	99.76	233	0.24	95,342	43.05	221,459
Compostela Valley	174,442	97.2	5,020	2.8	179,462	99.73	491	0.27	179,953	43.86	410,261
