= Mabanglo =

Mabanglo is a surname. Notable people with the surname include:

- Raul Mabanglo (fl. from 2025), Filipino politician
- Ruth Elynia Mabanglo (born 1949), American retired professor

== See also ==
- Matango
