= Maricar Zamora =

Filipino politician (born 1974)

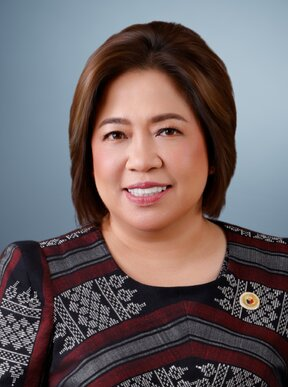
- Official portrait, 2025

Member of the House of Representatives from Davao de Oro's 1st district
- Incumbent
- Assumed office June 30, 2022
- Preceded by: Manuel E. Zamora
- In office June 30, 2010 – June 30, 2019
- Preceded by: Manuel E. Zamora
- Succeeded by: Manuel E. Zamora

Vice Governor of Davao de Oro
- In office June 30, 2019 – June 30, 2022
- Governor: Tyron Uy
- Preceded by: Manuel E. Zamora
- Succeeded by: Tyron Uy

Personal details
- Born: Maria Carmen Solamillo Zamora; May 3, 1974 (age 52) Dauin, Negros Oriental, Philippines
- Party: PFP (2026–present)
- Other political affiliations: Lakas (2022–2026); HNP (2018–2024); Liberal (2009–2018)
- Spouse: Raul Mabanglo
- Children: 3
- Parent: Manuel E. Zamora (father)

Maria Carmen "Maricar" Solamillo Zamora-Mabanglo (previously Apsay; born May 3, 1974) is a Filipino politician who is a member of the House of Representatives. She represents Davao de Oro's 1st congressional district. She is the daughter of politician Manuel E. Zamora, while her husband is incumbent Davao de Oro governor Raul Mabanglo.

Zamora supported the second impeachment of Vice President Sara Duterte in 2026, having previously refrained from signing the complaint for Duterte's first impeachment in 2025.

== Early life and education ==
Maricar Zamora was born on May 3, 1974 in Dauin, Negros Oriental to politician Manuel E. Zamora.

In 1995, she graduated with a bachelor of science degree in commerce at St. Mary's College, while also earning masteral units in public administration at the University of Southeastern Philippines.

== Political career ==
In 1993, at the age of 19, Zamora was elected president of the Sangguniang Kabataan Provincial Federation of Davao (now Davao del Norte), becoming ex-officio member of the Davao provincial board. By 1997, she became an administrative officer of the provincial government, serving until 2001.

=== Board member of Compostela Valley (2004–2010) ===
In 2004, Zamora was elected as a senior member of the sangguniang panlalawigan (provincial board) of Compostela Valley (now Davao de Oro).

=== House of Representatives (2010–2019) ===
In April 2012, Zamora released a letter expressing support for and solidarity with the Cambodian opposition leader Sam Rainsy.

In December 2015, Zamora attended a Liberal Party meeting in Quezon City where party officials expressed support for Mar Roxas' candidacy for president in the 2016 presidential election.

In May 2018, Rep. Zamora sponsored a bill seeking to rename the province of Compostela Valley to Davao de Oro. In January 2019, the bill was consolidated with a Senate bill filed by Senators Juan Miguel Zubiri and Sonny Angara, and signed into law as Republic Act No. 11297 on April 17, 2019. After a plebiscite was held on December 7, the province was officially renamed on December 9, 2019.

On March 15, 2018, Zamora acquired the rank of lieutenant colonel as a reserve officer of the Philippine Army.

=== Vice governor of Compostela Valley/Davao de Oro ===
In May 2019, Zamora ran unopposed for vice governor of Compostela Valley (later Davao de Oro) under the Hugpong ng Pagbabago (HNP) regional party and won.

=== House of Representatives (since 2022) ===
In the 2022 elections, Zamora won a fourth term as representative of Davao de Oro's 1st district, defeating PDP-Laban candidate Joanna Gentugaya and one independent candidate. On June 19, 2022, Zamora became a member of Lakas–CMD, then chaired by Vice President-elect Sara Duterte.

On April 15, 2024, Zamora and several other Davao Region officials were removed from the HNP regional party of Vice President Duterte amidst the 60-day suspension of Davao del Norte governor Edwin Jubahib.

In the 20th Congress of the Philippines, she is chair of the Philippine House Committee on Accounts.

In February 2025, Zamora was not among the signatories for the first impeachment of Vice President Sara Duterte. However, in May 2026, Zamora revised her stance and voted "yes" to the second impeachment of Vice President Duterte, becoming one of five representatives from the Davao Region to vote in favor of impeachment.

== Personal life ==
Zamora is married to Raul Mabanglo, her second husband and a civil engineer who is the incumbent governor of Davao de Oro. They married on September 8, 2014.

Zamora has three children from her previous marriage to Herminigildo Apsay.

== See also ==
- List of female members of the House of Representatives of the Philippines
- 15th Congress of the Philippines
- 16th Congress of the Philippines
- 17th Congress of the Philippines
- 19th Congress of the Philippines
- 20th Congress of the Philippines
