= 2016 Philippine House of Representatives elections in the Davao Region =

Elections were held in Davao Region for seats in the House of Representatives of the Philippines on May 9, 2016.

== Summary ==
Party	Popular vote	%	Swing	Seats won	Change
Liberal	550,624	32.61		5	
Nacionalista	334,006	19.78		3	
NUP	197,904	11.72		1	
Kusog Baryohanon	170,832	10.12		1	
PDP–Laban	69,108	4.09		1	
Hugpong	53,334	3.16		0	
NPC	58,603	3.47		0	
Aksyon	129,511	7.67		0	
Independent	113,075	6.70		0	
KBL	8,897	0.53		0	
PMP	2,402	0.15		0	
Valid votes	1,688,296	100.00			
Invalid votes					
Turnout					
Registered voters					

== Compostela Valley ==
=== 1st District ===
2016 Philippine House of Representatives election at Compostella Valley's 1st district
Party	Candidate	Votes	%	±%
Liberal	Ma. Carmen Zamora	89,546	63.43	
Aksyon	Joselito Brillantes	51,627	36.57	
Margin of victory				
Rejected ballots				
Total votes		'141,173'	'100'	

=== 2nd District ===
Incumbent Rommel Amatong is term limited and is running for Governor.

2016 Philippine House of Representatives election at Compostella Valley's 2nd district
Party	Candidate	Votes	%	±%
Liberal	Ruwel Peter Gonzaga	87,231	52.83	
Aksyon	Jose Caballero	77,884	47.17	
Margin of victory				
Rejected ballots				
Total votes		'165,115'	'100'	

== Davao City ==
=== 1st District ===
Incumbent congressman Karlo Nograles is running for re-election unopposed.

2016 Philippine House of Representatives election at Davao City's 1st district
Party	Candidate	Votes	%
NUP	Karlo Nograles	197,904	100.00
Total votes		197,904	100.00
NUP hold			

=== 2nd District ===
2016 Philippine House of Representatives election at Davao City's 2nd district
Party	Candidate	Votes	%
Liberal	Mylene Garcia	148,509	90.03
Independent	Christopher Abierra	16,455	9.97
Total votes		164,964	100.00
Liberal hold			

=== 3rd District ===
2016 Philippine House of Representatives election at Davao City's 3rd district
Party	Candidate	Votes	%
Nacionalista	Alberto Ungab	114,910	68.30
Hugpong	Kaloy Bello	53,334	31.70
Total votes		168,244	100.00
Nacionalista hold			

== Davao del Norte ==
=== 1st District ===
2016 Philippine House of Representatives election in Davao del Norte's 1st District
Party	Candidate	Votes	%
PDP–Laban	Pantaleon Alvarez	69,108	40.63
NPC	Arrel Olaño	52,478	30.85
Independent	Nicandro Suaybaguio, Jr.	41,766	24.55
Independent	Saboy Mahipus	4,352	2.56
PMP	Richard Dexter Welborn	2,402	1.41
Total votes		170,106	100

=== 2nd District ===
2016 Philippine House of Representatives election in Davao del Norte's 2nd District
Party	Candidate	Votes	%
Kusog Baryohanon	Antonio Floirendo, Jr.	170,832	100
Total votes		170,832	100
Kusog Baryohanon gain from NUP			

== Davao del Sur ==
2016 Philippine House of Representatives election in Davao del Sur Lone District
Party	Candidate	Votes	%
Nacionalista	Mercedes Cagas	120,968	48.07
Liberal	Joel Ray Lopez	97,037	38.56
Independent	Willhelima Almendras	24,743	9.83
KBL	Pablo Villaber	8,897	3.54
Total votes		251,645	100

== Davao Occidental ==
Lorna Bautista-Bandigan is running unopposed.

2016 Philippine House of Representatives election in Davao Occidental Lone District
Party	Candidate	Votes	%
Liberal	Lorna Bautista-Bandigan	53,461	100
Total votes		53,461	100
Liberal hold			

== Davao Oriental ==
=== 1st District ===
2016 Philippine House of Representatives election in Davao Oriental's 1st District
Party	Candidate	Votes	%
Nacionalista	Corazon Malanyaon	52,416	62.17
Independent	Ronie Osnan	25,759	30.56
NPC	Poyong Manguiob	6,125	7.27
Total votes		84,300	100

=== 2nd District ===
2016 Philippine House of Representatives election in Davao Oriental's 2nd District
Party	Candidate	Votes	%
Liberal	Jose Almario	74,840	62.08
Nacionalista	Dodong Miones	45,712	37.92
Total votes		120,552	100
