= Ruwel Peter Gonzaga =

Filipino lawyer and politician (born 1970)

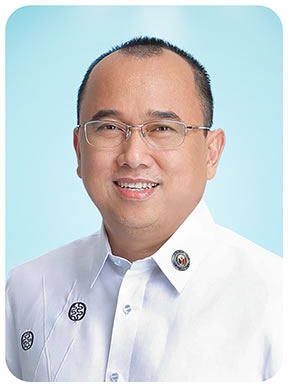
- Official portrait, 2022

Member of the House of Representatives from Davao de Oro’s 2nd district
- In office June 30, 2016 – June 30, 2025
- Preceded by: Rommel Amatong
- Succeeded by: Jhong Ceniza

Vice Governor of Compostela Valley
- In office June 30, 2001 – June 30, 2004
- Governor: Jose Caballero

Member of the Compostela Valley Provincial Board
- In office June 30, 1998 – June 30, 2001

Personal details
- Born: Ruwel Peter Sambas Gonzaga; April 27, 1970 (age 56) Mawab, Davao del Norte, Philippines
- Party: PFP (2024–present)
- Other political affiliations: PDP–Laban (2016–2024); Liberal (2015–2016); Reporma (until 2004)
- Spouse: Dorothy Gonzaga
- Children: 3
- Education: San Pedro College; Ateneo de Davao University (LLB)
- Occupation: Lawyer, politician

Ruwel Peter Sambas Gonzaga (born April 27, 1970) is a Filipino lawyer and politician. He served as representative of the 2nd District of Davao de Oro in the House of Representatives of the Philippines from 2016 to 2025.

== Early life and education ==
Gonzaga was born on April 27, 1970 in Mawab, in then-part of Davao del Norte. He studied San Pedro College for his college education. He took up law in Ateneo de Davao University. In 1997, Gonzaga passed the bar examinations.

== Political career ==
In 1998, Gonzaga became a member of the Compostela Valley Provincial Board until 2001.

In 2001, Gonzaga was elected as vice governor of Compostela Valley until 2004.

In 2004, Gonzaga ran as representative for second district of Compostela Valley but he lost to Prospero Amatong.

In 2016, Gonzaga ran for the second time and elected as representative of the second district of Compostela Valley he garnered 87,231 votes (52.83%). He served for three consecutive terms.

In 2025, Gonzaga ran for governor of Davao de Oro but he lost to Raul Mabanglo and garnered only 226,788 votes (48.59%).

== Personal life ==
Gonzaga is married to Dorothy Gonzaga and has three children.
