= Dorothy Gonzaga =

Filipino lawyer and politician (born 1973)

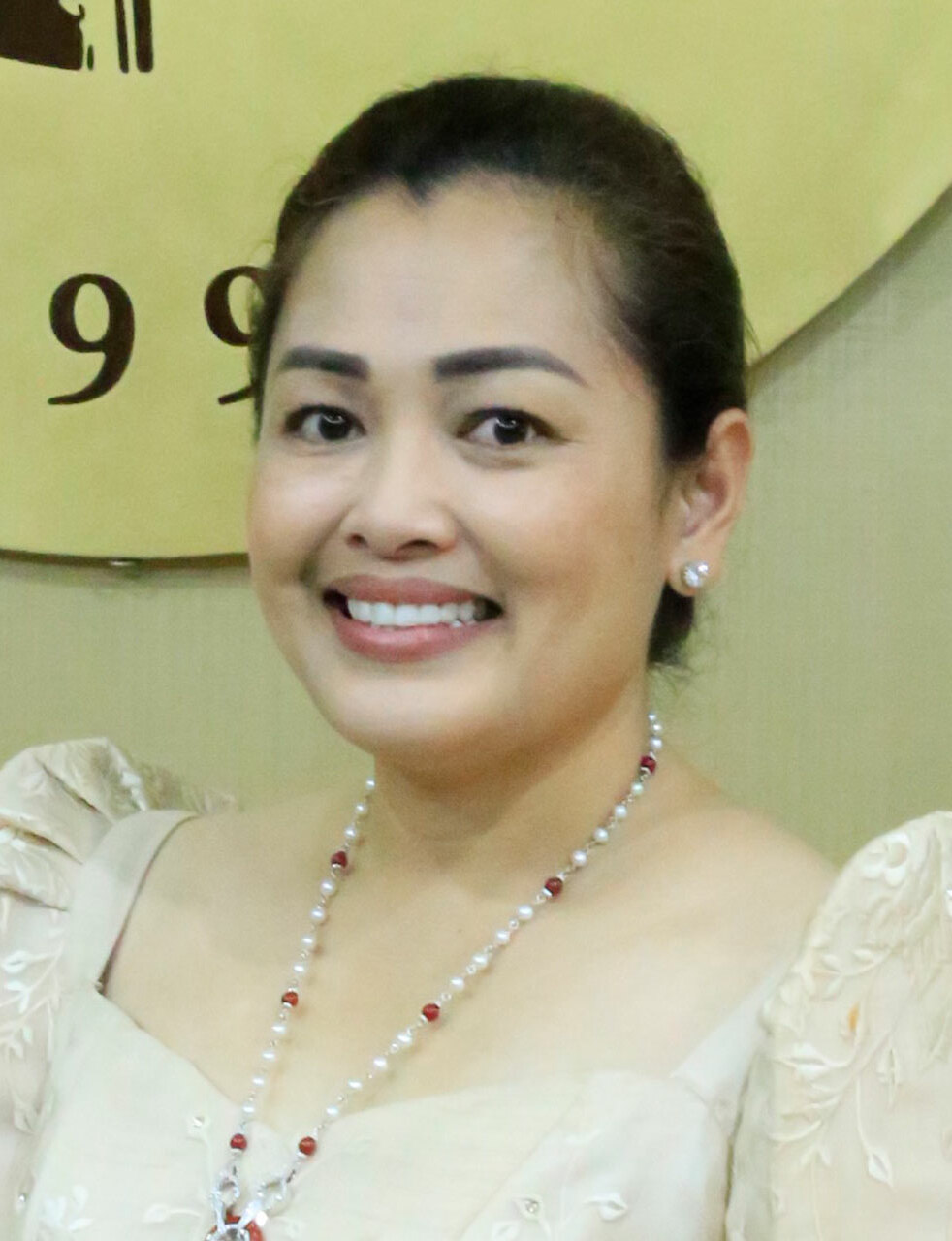
- Gonzaga in 2021

Vice Governor of Davao de Oro
- Incumbent
- Assumed office June 30, 2025
- Governor: Raul Mabanglo
- Preceded by: Tyron Uy

5th Governor of Davao de Oro
- In office June 30, 2022 – June 30, 2025
- Vice Governor: Tyron Uy
- Preceded by: Tyron Uy
- Succeeded by: Raul Mabanglo

Associate Justice at the Court of Appeals of the Philippines
- In office June 19, 2018 – November 3, 2021

Personal details
- Born: June 2, 1973 (age 53) Dauis, Bohol, Philippines
- Party: PFP (2024–present)
- Other political affiliations: Reporma (2021–2024)
- Spouse: Ruwel Peter Gonzaga
- Children: 3

Dorothy "Dotdot" Montejo-Gonzaga (born June 2, 1973) is a Filipino lawyer and politician who currently serves as vice governor of Davao De Oro since 2025. She previously served as the governor of Davao de Oro from 2022 until 2025. She is the first ever female governor elected in the province since its separation from Davao del Norte.

== Legal career ==
Prior to her election, she served at the Regional Trial Court Branch 4 in Panabo City. She previously a worked as an associate justice from 2018 to 2022 at Court of Appeal.

== Political career ==
She ran for governor in the 2022 local election. She won after garnering 226,731 votes against the former governor Arturo Chiongkee Uy.

== Projects ==
From 2022 to 2024, the Davao government prioritized road improvements, water system upgrades and construction of facilities like for schools and communities.

They completed ₱142 million worth of infrastructure projects in the Municipality of Compostela.

Newly-constructed houses for Masara survivors were turned-over in December 2024 with the housing resettlement project jointly made by both public and private sector.

== Personal life ==
She is married to Ruwel Peter Gonzaga, the Davao de Oro 2nd district congressman from 2016 to 2025.
