= Davao Occidental Provincial Board =

Legislative body of the province of Davao Occidental, Philippines

Davao Occidental Provincial Board Sangguniang Panlalawigan ng Davao Occidental

Type
- Type: Unicameral
- Term limits: 3 terms (9 years)

Leadership
- Presiding Davao Occidental Provincial Board: Lorna Bautista-Bandigan, Lakas-CMD since June 30, 2022

Structure
- Seats: 13 board members 1 ex officio presiding Davao Occidental Provincial Board
- Political groups: Lakas-CMD (5) NPC (5) TBD (1) Nonpartisan (2)
- Length of term: 3 years
- Authority: Local Government Code of the Philippines

Elections
- Voting system: Multiple non-transferable vote (regular members); Indirect election (ex officio members); Acclamation (sectoral member)
- Last election: May 12, 2025
- Next election: May 15, 2028

Meeting place
- Davao Occidental Provincial Capitol, Malita

The Davao Occidental Provincial Board is the Sangguniang Panlalawigan (provincial legislature) of the Philippine province of Davao Occidental .

The members are elected via plurality-at-large voting: the province is divided into two districts, each having four seats. A voter votes up to four names, with the top four candidates per district being elected. The vice governor is the ex officio presiding Davao Occidental Provincial Board, and only votes to break ties. The vice governor is elected via the plurality voting system province-wide.

The districts used in appropriation of members is not coextensive with the legislative district of Davao Occidental; unlike congressional representation which is at-large, Davao Occidental is divided into two districts for representation in the Sangguniang Panlalawigan.

Aside from the regular members, the board also includes the provincial federation presidents of the Liga ng mga Barangay (ABC, from its old name "Association of Barangay Captains"), the Sangguniang Kabataan (SK, youth councils) and the Philippine Councilors League (PCL).

== Apportionment ==
Elections	Seats per district		Ex officio seats	Total seats
Elections	1st	2nd	Ex officio seats	Total seats
2016–2025	4	4	3	11
2025–present	6	4	3	13

== List of members ==
=== Current members ===
These are the members after the 2022 local elections and 2023 barangay and SK elections:

- Vice Governor: Lorna Bautista-Bandigan (Lakas-CMD)

Seat	Board member	Party	Start of term	End of term
1st district	Zaldy S. Lataban	NPC	June 30, 2025	June 30, 2028
1st district	Benjamin T. Bautista III	NPC	June 30, 2025	June 30, 2028
1st district	Romeo T. Lopez	NPC	June 30, 2019	June 30, 2028
1st district	Amel P. Vistal	NPC	June 30, 2025	June 30, 2028
1st district	Carlo Chino G. Baliota	Lakas	June 30, 2025	June 30, 2028
2nd district	Rogelio P. Baribar	Lakas	June 30, 2022	June 30, 2028
2nd district	Frank William C. Galias	Lakas	June 30, 2022	June 30, 2028
2nd district	Danilo I. Omicas	Lakas	June 30, 2022	June 30, 2028
2nd district	Jessel M. Atay	Lakas	June 30, 2025	June 30, 2028
2nd district	Jomarie A. Olarte	NPC	June 30, 2025	June 30, 2028
ABC		Nonpartisan	July 30, 2018	January 1, 2023
PCL	TBD			June 30, 2028
SK		Nonpartisan	June 8, 2018	January 1, 2023

=== Vice Governor ===
Election year	Name	Party	Ref.
2016	Franklin Bautista	Liberal	
2019	Franklin Bautista	Hugpong	
2022	Lorna Bautista-Bandigan	Lakas	
2025	Lorna Bautista-Bandigan	Lakas	

=== 1st District ===
- Population (2024):

Election year	Member (party)	Member (party)	Member (party)	Ref.
2016	Alberto Baliota (NPC)	Allan Colina (NPC)	—	
2016	Romeo T. Lopez (NPC)	Alex Lumain (NPC)	—	
2019	Alberto Baliota (Hugpong)	Ali Colina Jr. (Hugpong)	—	
2019	Romeo T. Lopez (Hugpong)	Alex Lumain (Hugpong)	—	
2022	Brett Bautista (Lakas)	Alberto Baliota (Lakas)	—	
2022	Rogelio P. Baribar (Lakas)	Ali Colina Jr. (Lakas)	—	
2025	Benjamin T. Bautista III (NPC)	Carlo Chino G. Baliota (Lakas)	Rogelio P. Baribar (Lakas)	
2025	Zaldy S. Labatan (NPC)	Romeo T. Lopez (NPC)	Arnel P. Vistal (NPC)	

=== 2nd District ===
- Population (2024):

Election year	Member (party)	Member (party)	Member (party)	Member (party)	Ref.
2016	Vivencio Almano, Jr. (NPC)	Adelan de Arce (NPC)	Jardin John Joyce (Liberal)	Alexander Uy (NPC)	
2019	Vivencio Almano, Jr. (Hugpong)	Jason John Joyce (Hugpong)	Allen Lim (Independent)	Alexander Uy (Hugpong)	
2022	Vivencio Almano, Jr. (Lakas)	Jay-ar Galias (Independent)	Jason John Joyce (Lakas)	Danilo Omicas (Independent)	
2025	Jessel M. Atay (Lakas)	Frank William C. Gallas (Lakas)	Jomarie A. Olarte (NPC)	Danilo I. Omicas (Lakas)	
