= Raul Mabanglo =

Filipino politician

The Honorable Raul Mabanglo
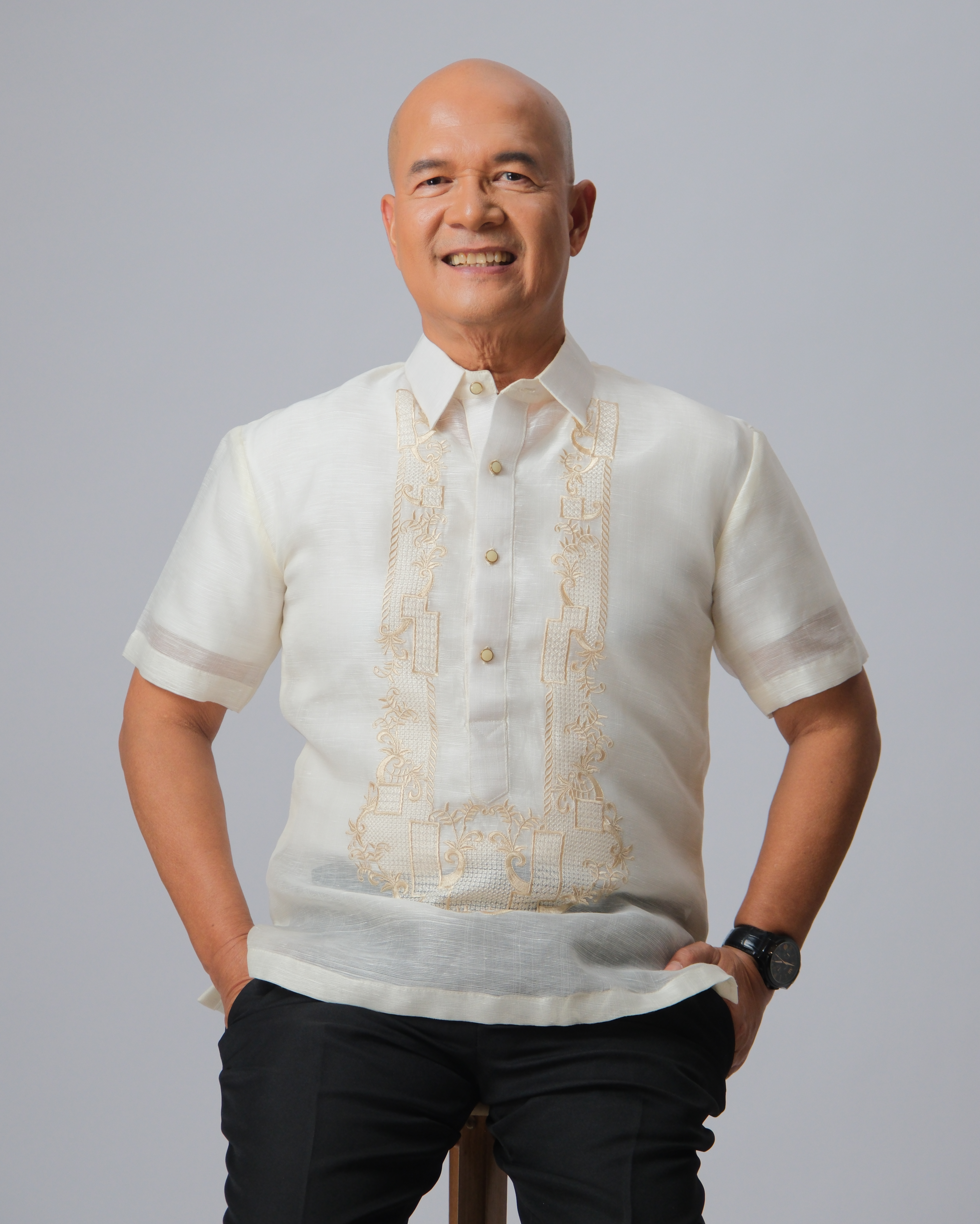
- Mabanglo in 2025

6th Governor of Davao de Oro
- Incumbent
- Assumed office June 30, 2025
- Vice Governor: Dorothy Gonzaga
- Preceded by: Dorothy Gonzaga

Personal details
- Born: Raul Gorospe Mabanglo; September 14, 1961 (age 64)
- Party: Independent (2024–present)
- Spouse: Maricar Zamora
- Relations: Manuel E. Zamora (father-in-law)
- Occupation: Politician and Civil Engineer

Raul Gorospe Mabanglo (born September 14, 1961) is a Filipino engineer and politician who has served as Governor of Davao de Oro since 2025.

== Political career ==
In 2023, Mabanglo was elected as the Barangay captain of Brgy. Poblacion, Monkayo, Davao de Oro. During that term, Mabanglo served as the Davao de Oro Liga ng mga Barangay president.

In 2025, Mabanglo ran for governor of Davao de Oro and won against Congressman Ruwel Peter Gonzaga, the husband of outgoing Governor Dorothy Gonzaga. Mabanglo defeated Gonzaga with 239,933 votes to Gonzaga's 226,788.

As governor, Mabanglo has worked to fix Davao de Oro’s hospitals and bring essential services closer to remote communities. In 2026, Mabanglo was honored as "Honorary Governor of the Year" in the 10th Nation Builders and MOSLIV Awards.

== Personal life ==
Mabanglo is a civil engineer by profession, having served 34 years in government service in such profession.

Mabanglo is married to Maricar Zamora, a politician and incumbent Congresswoman for Davao de Oro's 1st district. They were married on September 8, 2014.

Mabanglo has 3 step-children as a result of Zamora's previous marriage.

== See also ==
- List of current Philippine governors
