= Davao Oriental Provincial Board =

Legislative body of the province of Davao Oriental, Philippines

Davao Oriental Provincial Board Sangguniang Panlalawigan ng Davao Oriental

Type
- Type: Unicameral
- Term limits: 3 terms (9 years)

Leadership
- Presiding Officer: Ma. Glenda Monette R. Gayta, Nacionalista Party since June 30, 2025

Structure
- Seats: 14 board members 1 ex officio presiding Davao Oriental Provincial Board
- Political groups: Lakas-CMD (4) PFP (3) Nacionalista (2) PDP-Laban (1) TBD (1) Nonpartisan (3)
- Length of term: 3 years
- Authority: Local Government Code of the Philippines

Elections
- Voting system: Multiple non-transferable vote (regular members); Indirect election (ex officio members); Acclamation (sectoral member)
- Last election: May 12, 2025
- Next election: May 15, 2028

Meeting place
- Davao Oriental Provincial Capitol, Mati

The Davao Oriental Provincial Board is the Sangguniang Panlalawigan (provincial legislature) of the Philippine province of Davao Oriental.

The members are elected via plurality-at-large voting; the province is divided into two districts, each with five seats. A voter can vote for up to five names, with the top five candidates per district being elected. The vice governor is the ex officio presiding officer of the Davao Oriental Provincial Board and only votes to break ties. The vice governor is elected via the plurality voting system province-wide.

The districts used in the appropriation of members are coextensive with the legislative districts of Davao Oriental.

Aside from the regular members, the board also includes the provincial federation presidents of the Liga ng mga Barangay (ABC, from its old name "Association of Barangay Captains"), the Sangguniang Kabataan (SK, youth councils), and the Philippine Councilors League (PCL). Davao del Norte's provincial board also has a reserved seat for its indigenous people (IPMR).

== Apportionment ==
Elections	Seats per district		Ex officio seats	Reserved seats	Total seats
Elections	1st	2nd	Ex officio seats	Reserved seats	Total seats
2010–present	5	5	3	1	14

== List of members ==
=== Current members ===
These are the members after the 2025 local elections and 2023 barangay and SK elections:

- Vice Governor: Ma. Glenda Monette R. Gayta (Nacionalista)

Seat	Board member	Party	Start of term	End of term
1st district	Beverly M. Dayanan	PFP	June 30, 2025	June 30, 2028
1st district	Manuel M. Lepardo Jr.	Nacionalista	June 30, 2025	June 30, 2028
1st district	Anna Cheryl N. Castro	Lakas-CMD	June 30, 2022	June 30, 2028
1st district	Elijah Paul E. Palma Gil	Nacionalista	June 30, 2025	June 30, 2028
1st district	Maria Lady Hope J. Macayra	PFP	February 12, 2025	June 30, 2028
2nd district	Harold A. Montes	Lakas-CMD	June 30, 2022	June 30, 2028
2nd district	Daud V. Linsag	Lakas-CMD	June 30, 2022	June 30, 2028
2nd district	Stephen Paul L. Uy	PFP	June 30, 2022	June 30, 2028
2nd district	John Erwin G. Montojo	PDP-Laban	June 30, 2025	June 30, 2028
2nd district	Rotchie M. Ravelo	Lakas-CMD	June 30, 2022	June 30, 2028
ABC	Rustan Castillones	Nonpartisan	July 30, 2018	January 1, 2023
PCL				June 30, 2028
SK	Ronald Lara Jr.	Nonpartisan	June 8, 2018	January 1, 2023
IPMR	Charlie Ambasan	Nonpartisan		

=== Vice Governor ===
Election year	Name	Party	Ref.
2016	Niño Sotero L. Uy, Jr.	Liberal	
2019	Niño Sotero L. Uy, Jr.	Nacionalista	
2022	Niño Sotero L. Uy, Jr.	Nacionalista	
2025	Ma. Glenda Monette R. Gayta	Nacionalista	

=== 1st District ===
- Population (2024):

Election year	Member (party)	Member (party)	Member (party)	Member (party)	Member (party)	Ref.
2016	Mario Jose T. Palma Gil (Liberal)	Dante M. Caubang (Liberal)	Joselito B. Villademosa (Liberal)	Anna Louise B. Tambilawan (Liberal)	Laureano B. Taya (Liberal)	
2019	Nelson Dayanghirang Jr. (Nacionalista)	Dante M. Caubang (Nacionalista)	Joselito B. Villademosa (Nacionalista)	Nennette Palmera (Nacionalista)	Laureano B. Taya (Nacionalista)	
2022	Nelson Dayanghirang Jr. (Nacionalista)	Art Benjie Bulaong (Nacionalista)	Andy A. Monday (Nacionalista)	Nennette Palmera (Nacionalista)	Anna Cheryl Nuñez-Castro (Nacionalista)	
2025	Beverly M. Dayanan (PFP)	Manuel M. Lepardo, Jr. (Nacionalista)	Elijah Paul E. Palma Gil (Nacionalista)	Maria Lady Hope J. Macayra (PFP)	Anna Cheryl Nuñez-Castro (Lakas)	

=== 2nd District ===
- Population (2024):

Election year	Member (party)	Member (party)	Member (party)	Member (party)	Member (party)	Ref.
2016	Dennis V. Roflo, Jr. (Liberal)	Anacleto P. Macatabog (Liberal)	Lemuel Ian M. Larcia (KDO)	Louis N. Rabat (Independent)	Daud N. Linsag (Liberal)	
2019	Capistrano Roflo, Jr. (Nacionalista)	Anacleto P. Macatabog (Nacionalista)	Lemuel Ian M. Larcia (Nacionalista)	Louis N. Rabat (Nacionalista)	Enrico N. Antopuesto (PFP)	
2022	Shella Marie S. Go (Nacionalista)	Harold A. Montes (HNP)	Rotchie M. Ravelo (HNP)	Daud V. Linsag (HNP)	Stephen Paul L. Uy (Nacionalista)	
2025	John Erwin G. Montojo (PDP–Laban)	Harold A. Montes (Lakas)	Rotchie M. Ravelo (Lakas–CMD)	Daud V. Linsag (Lakas)	Stephen Paul L. Uy (PFP)	
