= Governor of Davao de Oro =

Local chief executive

- Punong Lalawigan ng Davao de Oro (in Tagalog)
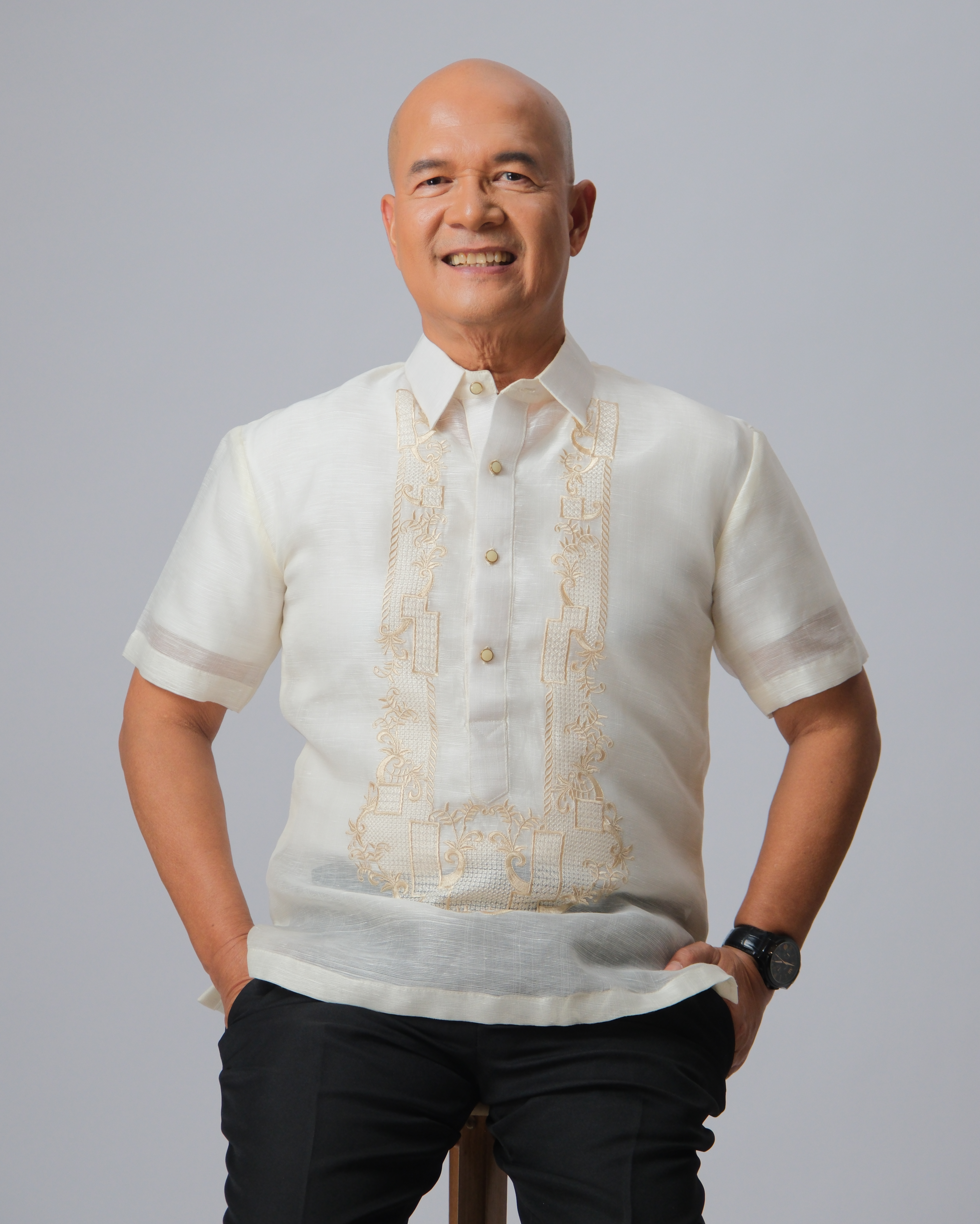
- Incumbent; Raul Mabanglo since June 30, 2025
- Style: The Provincial Governor
- Residence: Provincial Capitol Complex, Nabunturan
- Term length: 3 years and 3 terms
- Inaugural holder: Prospero S. Amatong
- Formation: March 8, 1998
- Website: https://davaodeoro.gov.ph/

The governor of Davao de Oro is the local chief executive of the Philippine province of Davao de Oro.

Davao de Oro, originally named Compostela Valley, was carved out of Davao del Norte in 1998. Davao del Norte's governor, Rommel Amatong, chose to be the new province's governor after voters approved its creation via a plebiscite. He then resigned a day after he assumed office, in order to run as representative. Luz Sarmiento, the wife of Davao del Norte representative Lorenzo Sarmiento, was appointed as governor until the first elections were held later that year. Jose Caballero was the first person to be elected as governor in 1998.

After being term limited in 2007, Arturo Uy was then elected. After he was term limited himself in 2016, his son, Jayvee Uy, was elected. In 2019, Compostela Valley was renamed into "Davao de Oro" after another plebiscite.

== List of governors ==
#	Image	Name	Took office	Left office	Party
1		Prospero Amatong	March 8, 1998	March 27, 1998	Lakas
-		Luz Sarmiento	March 27, 1998	June 30, 1998	
2		Jose Caballero	June 30, 1998	June 30, 2007	LAMMP
2		Jose Caballero	June 30, 1998	June 30, 2007	LDP
2		Jose Caballero	June 30, 1998	June 30, 2007	Lakas
3		Arturo Uy	June 30, 2007	June 30, 2016	Lakas
3		Arturo Uy	June 30, 2007	June 30, 2016	Lakas–Kampi
3		Arturo Uy	June 30, 2007	June 30, 2016	Liberal
4		Jayvee Uy	June 30, 2016	June 30, 2022	PDP–Laban
4		Jayvee Uy	June 30, 2016	June 30, 2022	Hugpong
5		Dorothy Gonzaga	June 30, 2022	June 30, 2025	PFP
6		Raul Mabanglo	June 30, 2025	Incumbent	Independent
