= Tyron Uy =

Filipino politician

The Honorable Tyron Uy
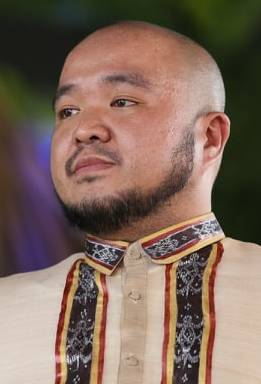

Vice Governor of Davao de Oro
- In office June 30, 2022 – June 30, 2025
- Governor: Dorothy Gonzaga
- Preceded by: Maria Carmen Zamora
- Succeeded by: Dorothy Gonzaga

Governor of Davao de Oro
- In office June 30, 2016 – June 30, 2022
- Vice Governor: Manuel E. Zamora (2016–2019); Maria Carmen Zamora (2019–2022)
- Preceded by: Arturo Uy
- Succeeded by: Dorothy Gonzaga

Personal details
- Born: Jayvee Tyron L. Uy; May 8, 1985 (age 41) Davao City, Philippines
- Party: Lakas–CMD (2021–present)
- Other political affiliations: HNP (2018–2024); Liberal (2015–2018)
- Relations: Arturo Tao Uy (father); Morris John Uy (brother)

Jayvee Tyron Lim Uy (born May 8, 1985) is a Filipino politician who served as governor of Davao de Oro from 2016 to 2022, and vice governor of Davao de Oro from 2022 to 2025 Uy was only 31 years old when he was first elected governor of Davao de Oro, then named as Compostela Valley, in 2016 and was re-elected in 2019. He is also known as the youngest governor of Mindanao.

In April 15, 2024, Uy was expelled from the Hugpong ng Pagbabago party for alleged "events and actions" conflicting with the party's positions.
