= Hugpong ng Pagbabago =

Dutertist regional political party

- President: Claude Bautista
- Chairwoman: Sara Duterte
- Secretary-General: Anthony del Rosario
- Founder: Sara Duterte
- Founded: February 23, 2018
- Membership (2025): 2 (Note: According to Sara Duterte, she and Board member Al David Uy are the only members left.)
- Ideology: Davao regionalism Populism; Dutertismo
- National affiliation: PDP (2019–present); RAGE Coalition (2026–present); DuterTen (2024–2025); UniTeam (2021–2022)
- Coalition members (2019): PDP–Laban (2019); Lakas–CMD (2019); NUP (2019); NPC (2019); Nacionalista (2019); PMP (2019); LDP (2019)
- Colors: Blue, red, and green
- House of Representatives: 0 / 11 (Davao Region seats only)
- Provincial Governors: 0 / 5 (Davao Region seats only)
- Vice Provincial Governors: 0 / 5 (Davao Region seats only)
- Councilors: 50 / 100 (Davao Region seats only)

Hugpong ng Pagbabago (HNP, lit. 'Alliance of Change') is a Dutertist regional political party and former political alliance in the Philippines. Formed in 2018 by Sara Duterte, the party was established in support of President Rodrigo Duterte's administration, and was the administration electoral alliance for the 2019 Philippine general election.

In the 2022 Philippine presidential election, the party supported the candidacies of Bongbong Marcos and Sara Duterte for the Philippine presidency and vice presidency, respectively, under the UniTeam alliance.

== History ==
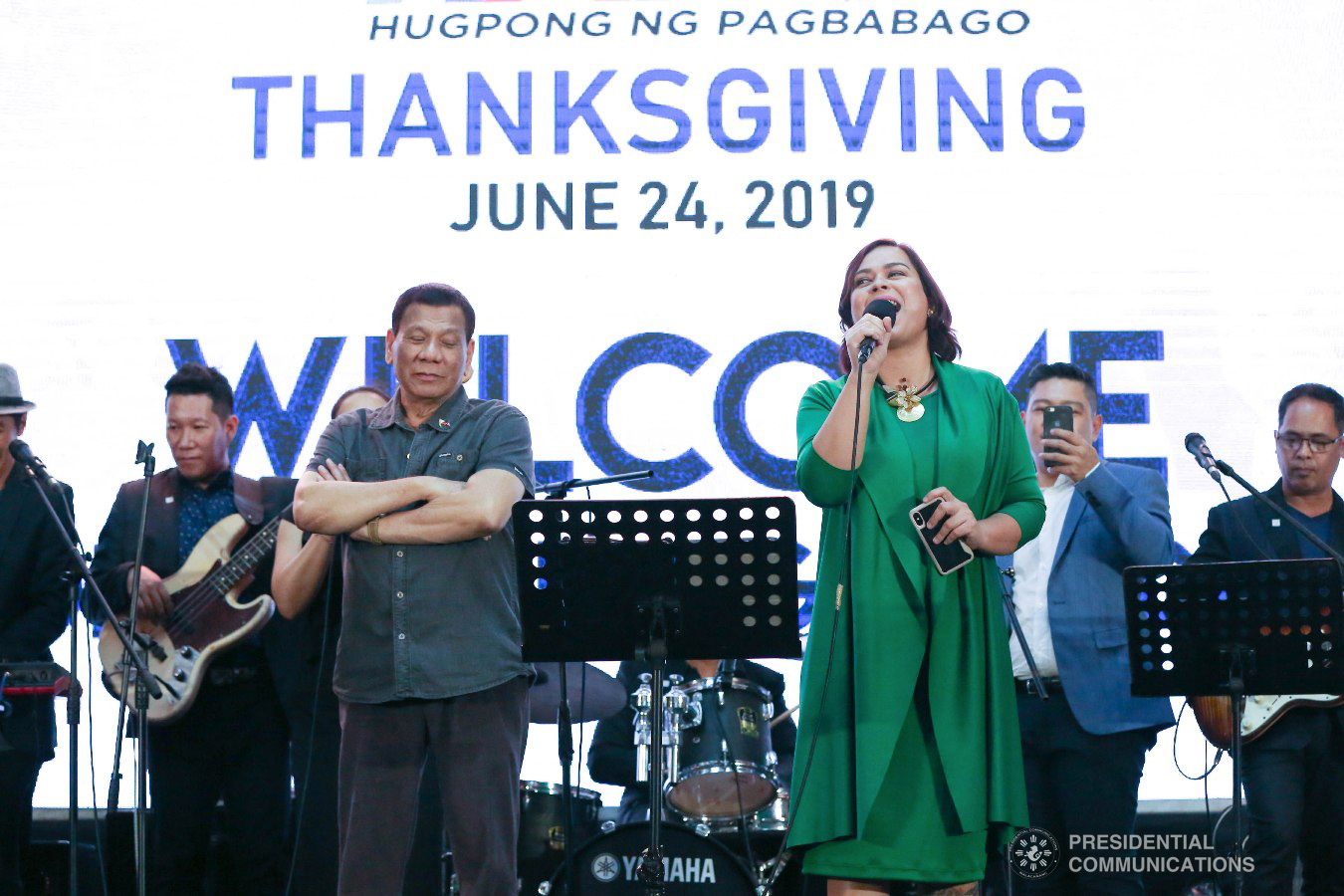
President Rodrigo Duterte performs a duet with then Davao City Mayor Sara Duterte during the Hugpong ng Pagbabago Thanksgiving Night at The Peninsula Manila in Makati City on June 24, 2019.

The party was formally launched on February 23, 2018, by Sara Duterte and four governors from the Davao Region. In addition to the party's alignment with the Duterte administration, Sara Duterte said that she formed Hugpong ng Pagbabago "to pursue the ideals of what we all want, a strong region, a secure life for our constituents, good governance and effective leadership of the members of the party." The Commission on Elections (COMELEC) granted the accreditation of Hugpong ng Pagbabago as a regional political party in July 2018. A proposal to turn the party into a national party was shelved by Duterte in January 2019.

In preparation for the 2019 elections, HNP held its first political rally on February 12, 2019, in San Fernando, Pampanga. HNP partnered with the parties of PDP–Laban, Nacionalista, Lakas–CMD, Pwersa ng Masang Pilipino, Nationalist People's Coalition, Laban ng Demokratikong Pilipino, National Unity Party, and the People's Reform Party, and formed a senatorial slate consisting of 13 candidates for the 2019 senatorial race. Although HNP was allied with the Duterte administration, President Duterte stated that he would not personally endorse the HNP's slate; he later endorsed all of HNP's candidates, except for senators Bong Revilla and Jinggoy Estrada. 9 out of the 13 candidates under Hugpong ng Pagbabago won a seat in the Senate.

For the 2022 Philippine general election, the HNP formed a coalition with three political parties under the UniTeam alliance, supporting Bongbong Marcos' 2022 presidential campaign. The party also renewed its alliances with the National Unity Party and the People's Reform Party.

== Current officials ==
- Chairperson: Sara Duterte, Vice President of the Philippines
- President: Claude Bautista, Davao Occidental representative
- Secretary-General: Anthony G. del Rosario, Former Governor, Davao del Norte
- Treasurer: Jayvee Tyron Uy, Vice Governor, Davao de Oro

== Candidates for the 2019 Philippine general elections ==
=== Senatorial slate ===
Candidate name and party	Position	Elected
Sonny Angara; LDP	Senator	Yes
Bong Revilla; Lakas	former Senator	Yes
Pia Cayetano; Nacionalista	former Senator and House representative for Taguig's second district	Yes
Ronald dela Rosa; PDP–Laban	Chief of the Philippine National Police and Director-General of the Bureau of Corrections	Yes
JV Ejercito; Nationalist People's Coalition	Senator	No
Jinggoy Estrada; Pwersa ng Masang Pilipino	former Senator	No
Bong Go; PDP–Laban	Special Assistant to the President	Yes
Dong Mangudadatu; PDP–Laban	House representative for Maguindanao's second district	No
Jiggy Manicad; Independent	None (former Journalist)	No
Imee Marcos; Nacionalista	Governor of Ilocos Norte	Yes
Koko Pimentel; PDP–Laban	Senator	Yes
Francis Tolentino; PDP–Laban	Presidential Adviser on Political Affairs	Yes
Cynthia Villar; Nacionalista	Senator	Yes

== Electoral performance ==
=== Presidential and vice presidential elections ===
Year	Presidential election				Vice presidential election			
Year	Candidate	Votes	%	Result	Candidate	Votes	%	Result
2022	None (Note: Duterte's running mate was Bongbong Marcos of PFP who won.)			—N/a	Sara Duterte (Note: Ran under Lakas–CMD.)	32,208,417	61.53	Won

=== Legislative elections ===
Year	Votes	%	Seats	+/–	Result	Year	Votes	%	Seats	+/–	Result
Congress of the Philippines
2019 (Note: As a regional political party in the Davao Region.)	652,318	1.61%	3 / 11	N/A	Majority	2019 (Note: As an alliance of several political parties.)	203,651,824	56.23%	9 / 24	N/A	Majority
2022	1,223,815	2.54	6 / 11	▲3		2022	Not participating (Note: As an alliance, HNP was superseded by the UniTeam alliance.)				—N/a

== See also ==
- Coalition for Change (Philippines)
- Hugpong sa Tawong Lungsod, their local counterpart in Davao City
- UniTeam, their successor as coalition
- Otso Diretso, their 2019 coalition rival
