= 2016 Davao Occidental local elections =

Philippine election

2016 Davao Occidental gubernatorial election
- May 9, 2016
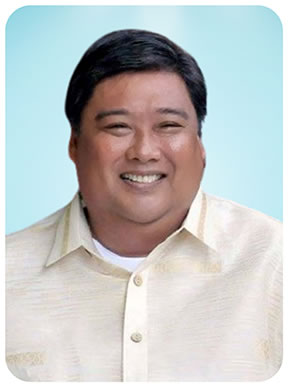
Nominee	Claude Bautista
Party	NPC
Running mate	Franklin Bautista (Liberal)
Popular vote	79,073
Percentage	100.00%
Elected Governor
Claude Bautista
NPC

The first Davao Occidental local elections were held on May 9, 2016, as part of the 2016 general election. Voters selected candidates for all local positions: a town mayor, vice mayor and town councilors, as well as members of the Sangguniang Panlalawigan, the governor, vice-governor, and representative for the Lone District of Davao Occidental.

== Background ==
The province of Davao Occidental held elections for the first time since its creation, and the key positions available were sought by members of just one family: the Bautistas.

Davao del Sur Governor Claude Bautista has two brothers, Franklin and Benjamin, Jr. "Joseph", and a sister, Lorna Bautista-Bandigan. All of them ran for positions in the province unopposed.

Franklin is congressman of the 2nd district of Davao del Sur, while Joseph is on his last term as mayor of Malita town in Davao Occidental. On October 12, Lorna Bautista-Bandigan filed her certificate of candidacy for the lone congressional district of Davao Occidental. Bradley Bautista, son of Davao del Sur congressman Franklin, filed for mayor of Malita town, Davao Occidental, seeking to succeed his uncle. Joseph Bautista ran for vice mayor of Davao Occidental.

== Results ==
=== Governor ===
Davao Occidental Gubernatorial election
Party	Candidate	Votes	%
NPC	Claude Bautista	79,073	100.00%
Valid ballots		79,073	66.18%
Invalid or blank votes		40,410	33.82%
Total votes		119,483	100.00%
NPC hold			

=== Vice-Governor ===
Davao Occidental Vice-gubernatorial election
Party	Candidate	Votes	%
Liberal	Franklin Bautista	70,196	100.00%
Valid ballots		70,196	58.75%
Invalid or blank votes		49,287	41.25%
Total votes		119,483	100.00%
Liberal hold			

=== Representative ===
2016 Philippine House of Representatives election in Davao Occidental Lone District
Party	Candidate	Votes	%
Liberal	Lorna Bautista-Bandigan	60,653	100.00%
Valid ballots		60,653	50.76%
Invalid or blank votes		58,830	49.24%
Total votes		119,483	100.00%
Liberal hold			

=== Sangguniang Panlalawigan elections ===
==== 1st Provincial District ====
Davao Occidental Board Member election - District 1
Party	Candidate	Votes	%
NPC	Alberto Baliota I	27,268	16.82%
NPC	Allan Colina	23,021	14.20%
NPC	Romeo Lopez	22,664	13.98%
NPC	Alex Lumain	17,998	11.10%
Nacionalista	Boyboy Wong	16,268	10.03%
Independent	Mila Cabañero	15,964	9.84%
Liberal	Marianela Malinao	15,301	9.44%
Liberal	Mateo Sumilat	12,655	7.80%
Independent	Ka Dote Tampadong	7,327	4.52%
Independent	Aldors Doromal	3,689	2.27%
Total votes		162,155	100.00%

==== 2nd Provincial District ====
Davao Occidental Board Member election - District 2
Party	Candidate	Votes	%
Liberal	Jardin John Joyce	14,407	17.39%
NPC	Vivencio Almano, Jr.	12,169	14.68%
NPC	Adelan De Arce	11,118	13.42%
NPC	Alexander Uy	9,846	11.88%
Liberal	Paulito Montero	9,819	11.85%
NPC	Emily Johnson	9,355	11.29%
Independent	Jambo Joyce	5,750	6.94%
Aksyon	Alexander Guillermo	5,090	6.14%
Independent	Anecito Mangolayon	3,498	4.22%
Aksyon	Victorio Jr. Gamino	1,816	2.19%
Total votes		82,868	100.00%

=== Mayoral elections ===
==== Don Marcelino ====
John Johnson is term-limited and he is running for Vice Mayor. Michael Maruya is running in his place.

Don Marcelino Mayoral election
Party	Candidate	Votes	%
Liberal	Michael Maruya	8,510	100.00%
Valid ballots		8,510	54.73%
Invalid or blank votes		7,038	45.27%
Total votes		15,548	100.00%
Liberal hold			

Michael Maruya is term-limited and he is running for Mayor. John Johnson is running in his place.

Don Marcelino Vice mayoral election
Party	Candidate	Votes	%
Liberal	John Johnson	6,001	42.55%
Aksyon	Reynold Llanto	5,523	39.16%
Independent	Dorivic Maruya	2,581	18.30%
Valid ballots		14,105	90.72%
Margin of victory		478	3.39%
Invalid or blank votes		1,443	9.28%
Total votes		15,548	100.00%
Liberal hold			

==== Jose Abad Santos ====
James Joyce is the incumbent.

Jose Abad Santos Mayoral election
Party	Candidate	Votes	%
NPC	James Joyce	15,414	66.94%
Aksyon	Alex Wangkay	7,614	33.06%
Valid ballots		23,028	88.25%
Margin of victory		7,800	33.87%
Invalid or blank votes		3,067	11.75%
Total votes		26,095	100.00%
NPC hold			

Ester Sioco is the incumbent.

Jose Abad Santos Vice mayoral election
Party	Candidate	Votes	%
NPC	Jason John Joyce	13,099	58.45%
Aksyon	Ester Sioco	9,310	41.55%
Valid ballots		22,409	85.87%
Margin of victory		3,789	16.91%
Invalid or blank votes		3,686	14.13%
Total votes		26,095	100.00%
NPC gain from Aksyon			

==== Malita ====
Joseph Bautista is term limited and he is running for Vice Mayor. His nephew, incumbent Vice Mayor Bradley, is running unopposed.

Malita Mayoral election
Party	Candidate	Votes	%
Liberal	Bradley Bautista	30,816	100.00%
Valid ballots		30,816	67.92%
Invalid or blank votes		14,556	32.08%
Total votes		45,372	100.00%
Liberal hold			

Bradley Bautista is term limited and he is running for Mayor. His uncle, incumbent Mayor Joseph, is running unopposed.

Malita Vice mayoral election
Party	Candidate	Votes	%
Liberal	Benjamin "Joseph" Bautista, Jr.	30,208	100.00%
Valid ballots		30,208	66.58%
Invalid or blank votes		15,164	33.42%
Total votes		45,372	100.00%
Liberal hold			

==== Santa Maria ====
Rudy Mariscal, Sr. is the incumbent.

Santa Maria Mayoral election
Party	Candidate	Votes	%
NPC	Rudy Mariscal, Sr.	13,274	100.00%
Valid ballots		13,274	57.13%
Invalid or blank votes		9,962	42.87%
Total votes		23,236	100.00%
NPC hold			

George Mariscal is the incumbent.

Santa Maria Vice mayoral election
Party	Candidate	Votes	%
NPC	George Mariscal	11,627	59.76%
Independent	Max Monsad	7,828	40.24%
Valid ballots		19,455	74.55%
Margin of victory		3,799	19.53%
Invalid or blank votes		6,640	25.45%
Total votes		26,095	100.00%
NPC hold			

==== Sarangani ====
Virginia Cawa is the incumbent.

Sarangani Mayoral election
Party	Candidate	Votes	%
Liberal	Virginia Cawa	6,850	100.00%
Valid ballots		6,850	74.20%
Invalid or blank votes		2,382	25.80%
Total votes		9,232	100.00%
Liberal hold			

Jerry Cawa is the incumbent.

Sarangani Vice mayoral election
Party	Candidate	Votes	%
NPC	Jerry Cawa	6,847	100.00%
Valid ballots		6,847	74.17%
Invalid or blank votes		2,385	25.83%
Total votes		9,232	100.00%
NPC hold			
