= Davao del Sur's 2nd congressional district =

Legislative district of the Philippines

Davao del Sur's 2nd congressional district is an obsolete congressional district in Davao del Sur for the House of Representatives of the Philippines from 1987 to 2016. The district encompassed eight southern local government units of the previously undivided province, most of which now constitute the province of Davao Occidental. It was created ahead of the 1987 Philippine House of Representatives elections following the ratification of the 1987 constitution which established two districts for Davao del Sur and another three districts for Davao City. Prior to the 1987 apportionment, Davao del Sur residents elected their representatives to the national legislatures on a provincewide basis through the Davao del Sur's at-large congressional district. The district was last contested at the 2013 Philippine House of Representatives elections. Davao del Sur returned to electing its representatives at-large in 2016 after losing most of its southern territory to the province of Davao Occidental created by Republic Act No. 10360 on January 4, 2013.

== Representation history ==
#	Image	Member	Term of office		Congress	Party	Electoral history	Constituent LGUs
#	Image	Member	Start	End	Congress	Party	Electoral history	Constituent LGUs
=== Davao del Sur's 2nd district for the House of Representatives of the Philippines ===
District created February 2, 1987 from Davao del Sur's at-large district.
1		Benjamin V. Bautista Sr.	June 30, 1987	June 30, 1998	8th	Liberal	Elected in 1987.	1987–2016; Don Marcelino, Jose Abad Santos, Kiblawan, Malalag, Malita, Santa Maria, Sarangani, Sulop
1		Benjamin V. Bautista Sr.	June 30, 1987	June 30, 1998	9th	Lakas–CMD	Re-elected in 1992.	1987–2016; Don Marcelino, Jose Abad Santos, Kiblawan, Malalag, Malita, Santa Maria, Sarangani, Sulop
1		Benjamin V. Bautista Sr.	June 30, 1987	June 30, 1998	10th	Lakas–CMD	Re-elected in 1995.	1987–2016; Don Marcelino, Jose Abad Santos, Kiblawan, Malalag, Malita, Santa Maria, Sarangani, Sulop
2		Franklin Bautista	June 30, 1998	June 30, 2001	11th	Lakas–CMD	Elected in 1998.	1987–2016; Don Marcelino, Jose Abad Santos, Kiblawan, Malalag, Malita, Santa Maria, Sarangani, Sulop
3		Claude Bautista	June 30, 2001	June 30, 2007	12th	NPC	Elected in 2001.	1987–2016; Don Marcelino, Jose Abad Santos, Kiblawan, Malalag, Malita, Santa Maria, Sarangani, Sulop
3		Claude Bautista	June 30, 2001	June 30, 2007	13th	NPC	Re-elected in 2004.	1987–2016; Don Marcelino, Jose Abad Santos, Kiblawan, Malalag, Malita, Santa Maria, Sarangani, Sulop
(2)		Franklin Bautista	June 30, 2007	June 30, 2016	14th	KAMPI	Elected in 2007.	1987–2016; Don Marcelino, Jose Abad Santos, Kiblawan, Malalag, Malita, Santa Maria, Sarangani, Sulop
(2)		Franklin Bautista	June 30, 2007	June 30, 2016	14th	Lakas–CMD	Elected in 2007.	1987–2016; Don Marcelino, Jose Abad Santos, Kiblawan, Malalag, Malita, Santa Maria, Sarangani, Sulop
(2)		Franklin Bautista	June 30, 2007	June 30, 2016	15th	Liberal	Re-elected in 2010.	1987–2016; Don Marcelino, Jose Abad Santos, Kiblawan, Malalag, Malita, Santa Maria, Sarangani, Sulop
(2)		Franklin Bautista	June 30, 2007	June 30, 2016	16th	Liberal	Re-elected in 2013.	1987–2016; Don Marcelino, Jose Abad Santos, Kiblawan, Malalag, Malita, Santa Maria, Sarangani, Sulop
District dissolved into Davao Occidental's and Davao del Sur's at-large districts.

== See also ==
- Legislative districts of Davao del Sur
