= Governor of Davao Occidental =

Head of government of the Philippine province of Davao Occidental

- Punong Lalawigan ng Davao Occidental (Filipino)
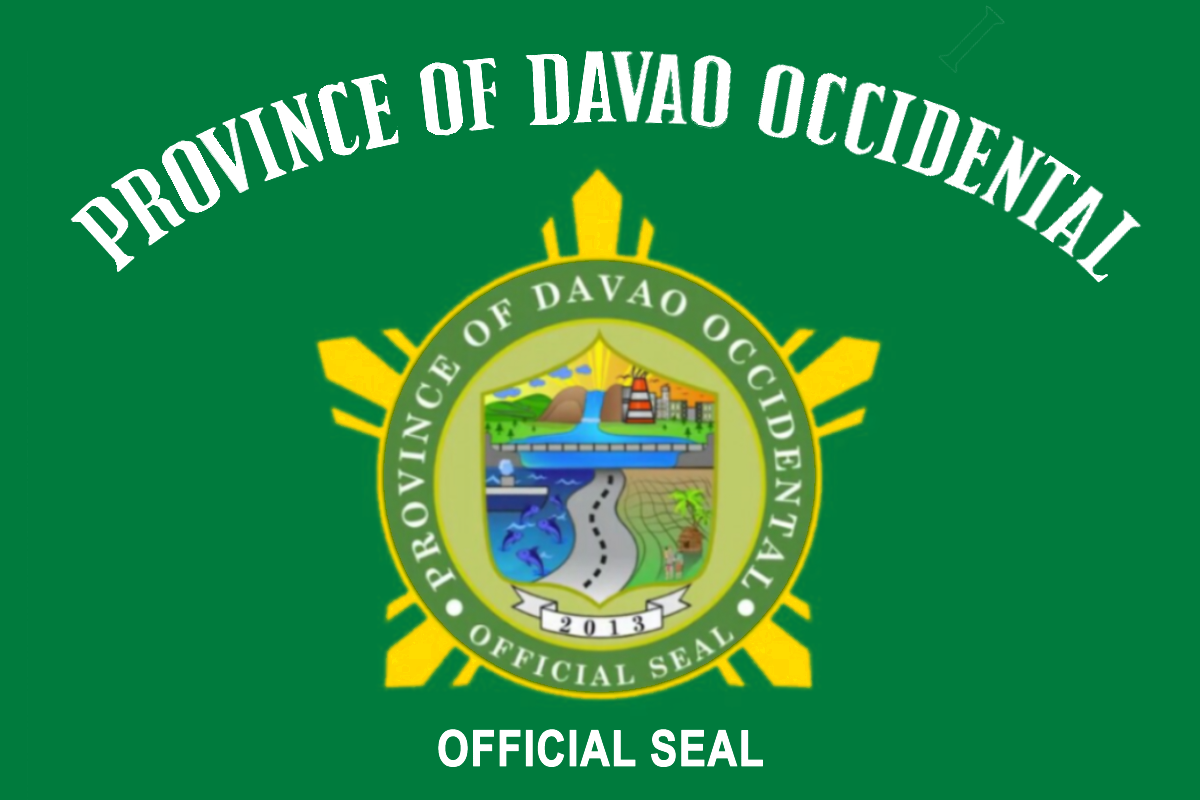
- Flag of Davao Occidental

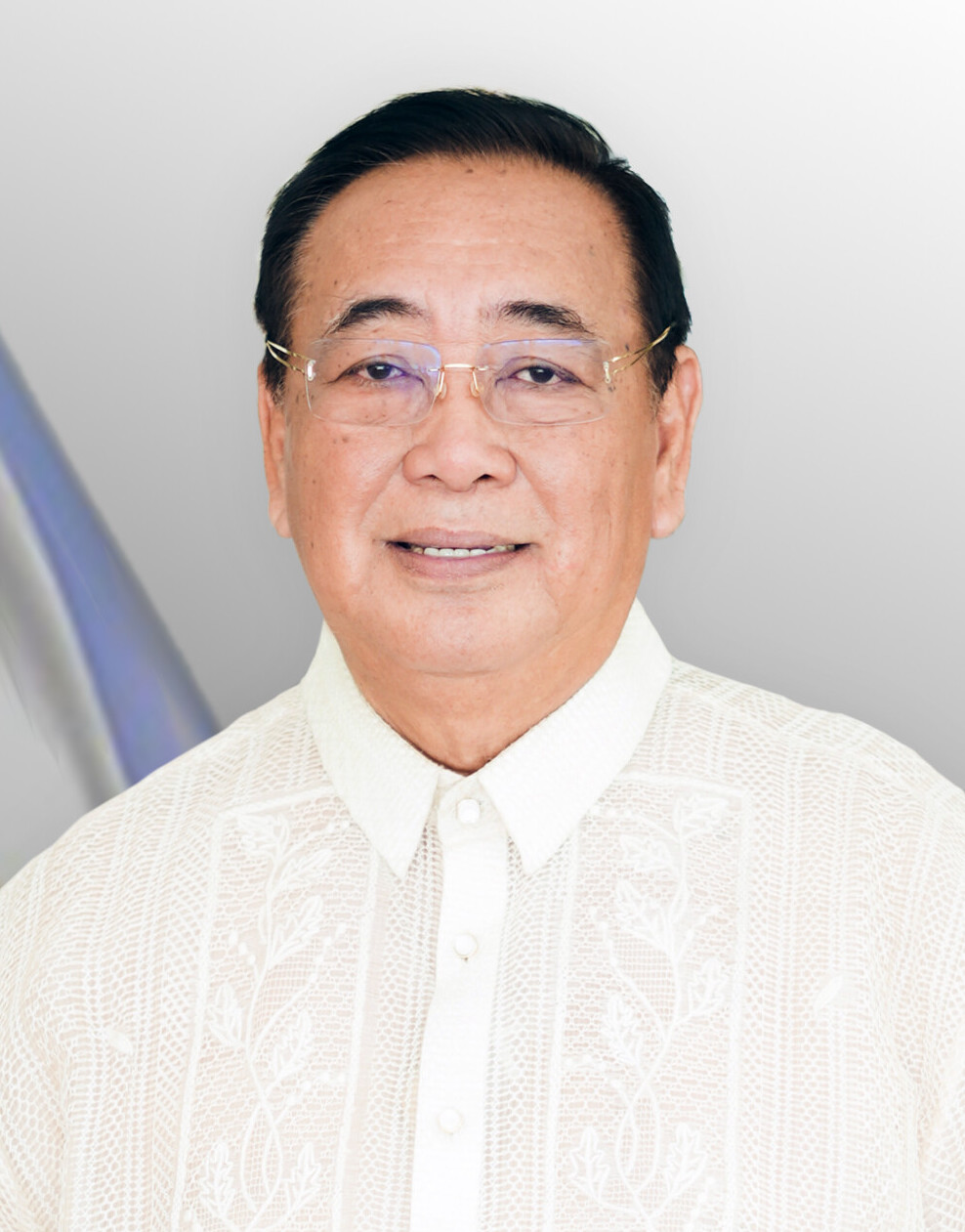
- Incumbent; Franklin Bautista since June 30, 2022
- Seat: Provincial Capital Building, Malita
- Term length: 3 years, renewable thrice
- Inaugural holder: Claude Bautista
- Deputy: Vice Governor of Davao Occidental
- Website: davaooccidental.gov.ph/government/

The governor of Davao Occidental (Filipino: Punong Lalawigan ng Davao Occidental) is the head of government of the Philippine province of Davao Occidental.

Established in 2016, the governor serves as the head of the province's executive branch. The governor's responsibilities include overseeing the provincial government, implementing policies and development plans, enforcing laws, managing resources and revenues, maintaining peace and order, and ensuring the delivery of basic services, as mandated by the 1991 Local Government Code.

The governor is limited to three consecutive three-year terms. The current governor of Davao Occidental is Franklin Bautista, a member of the Partido Federal ng Pilipinas, who first assumed office on June 30, 2022, and was re-elected in 2025. His brother, Claude Bautista, was the province's first governor, serving from 2016 to 2022.

== History ==
Republic Act No. 10360, creating the province of Davao Occidental, was enacted on January 14, 2013. A plebiscite held on October 28, 2013, ratified the province's creation, thereby establishing the position of governor.

Former Davao del Sur governor Claude Bautista was elected the province's first governor in 2016, with his brother Franklin Bautista elected vice governor. They were re-elected in 2019.

In 2022, Claude ran for the House of Representatives, while Franklin successfully ran for governor with Lorna Bautista-Bandigan as his running mate. They were re-elected in 2025.

== List of governors ==
Governors of Davao Occidental
No.	Governor	Term in office	Party	Election	Vice Governor
1	Claude Bautista (born 1960)	June 30, 2016 – June 30, 2022	NPC	2016	Franklin Bautista
1	Claude Bautista (born 1960)	June 30, 2016 – June 30, 2022	HNP	2019	Franklin Bautista
2	Franklin Bautista (born 1952)	June 30, 2022 – Incumbent	Lakas	2022	Lorna Bautista-Bandigan
2	Franklin Bautista (born 1952)	June 30, 2022 – Incumbent	PFP	2025	Lorna Bautista-Bandigan

== Vice Governor of Davao Occidental ==
Vice Governor of Davao Occidental
- Pangalawang Punong Lalawigan ng Davao Occidental (Filipino)
- Incumbent; Lorna Bautista-Bandigan since June 30, 2022
- Seat: Provincial Capital Building, Malita
- Term length: 3 years, renewable thrice
- Inaugural holder: Franklin Bautista

The vice governor of Davao Occidental is the second-highest executive officer of the government of the Philippine province of Davao Occidental. The vice governor is elected to serve a three-year term and may serve a maximum of three consecutive terms. The vice governor also serves as acting governor in the absence of the governor of Davao Occidental and as presiding officer of the Davao Occidental Provincial Board.

The current vice governor is Lorna Bautista-Bandigan, a member of Lakas–CMD, who assumed office on June 30, 2022, and was re-elected in 2025. She is the first woman elected to the office in the province.

=== List of vice governors ===
Vice Governors of Davao Occidental
No.	Vice Governor	Term in office	Party	Election	Governor
1	Franklin Bautista (born 1952)	June 30, 2016 – June 30, 2022	Liberal	2016	Claude Bautista
1	Franklin Bautista (born 1952)	June 30, 2016 – June 30, 2022	HNP	2019	Claude Bautista
2	Lorna Bautista-Bandigan (born 1954)	June 30, 2022 – Incumbent	Lakas	2022	Franklin Bautista
2	Lorna Bautista-Bandigan (born 1954)	June 30, 2022 – Incumbent	Lakas	2025	Franklin Bautista
