= Legislative districts of Davao Occidental =

"Political divisions of Davao Occidental in Congress"

The legislative districts of Davao Occidental are the representations of the province of Davao Occidental in the Congress of the Philippines. The province is currently represented in the lower house of the Congress through its lone congressional district.

== History ==
Prior to gaining separate representation, areas now under the jurisdiction of Davao Occidental were represented under the Department of Mindanao and Sulu (1917–1935), Davao Province (1935–1967), Region XI (1978–1984) and Davao del Sur (1967–1972; 1984–2016).

The passage of Republic Act No. 10360 and its subsequent ratification by plebiscite on October 28, 2013 separated from Davao del Sur's second district five municipalities to create the province of Davao Occidental. Per Section 7 of R.A. 10360, the new province was to comprise a single congressional district; voters began to elect the new province's separate representative beginning in 2016.

== Lone District ==
- Population (2015): 316,342

Period	Representative
17th Congress; 2016–2019	Lorna P. Bautista-Bandigan
18th Congress; 2019–2022	Lorna P. Bautista-Bandigan
19th Congress; 2022–2025	Claude P. Bautista
20th Congress; 2025–2028	Claude P. Bautista

== See also ==
- Legislative district of Mindanao and Sulu
- Legislative district of Davao
- Legislative district of Davao del Sur
