= Balut =

Balut may refer to:

== Places ==
- Balut-e Asadi, a village in Fars Province, Iran
- Balut Beyg, a village in Lorestan Province, Iran
- Balut Island, a Philippine island and volcano
- Baluthupa, a village in Bangladesh

== Other uses ==
- Balut (autobiography), an autobiography by Indian writer Daya Pawar
- Balut (food), a boiled fertilized egg, a popular food in parts of Asia
- Balut (game), a dice game named after the Asian food
- "Balut" (song), a 2023 song by Doja Cat from her album Scarlet

== See also ==
- Ballute, a parachute-like braking device
- Baloot, a card game popular in Persian Gulf-area countries
- Balot (disambiguation)
