= Claudine Bautista-Lim =

Filipino politician and entrepreneur (born 1985)

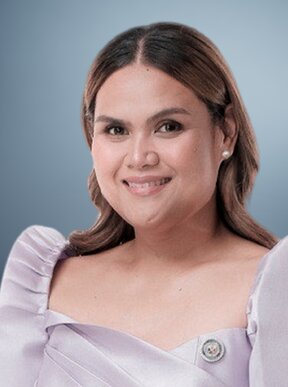
- Official portrait, 2025

Representative in the House of Representatives of the Philippines for the DUMPER Partylist
- Incumbent
- Assumed office June 30, 2019

Personal details
- Born: Claudine Diana Bautista; December 2, 1985 (age 40) Davao City, Philippines
- Party: DUMPER Partylist (2018–present)
- Spouse: Tracker Lim
- Relations: Lorna Bautista-Bandigan (aunt)
- Parent: Claude Bautista (father)
- Education: Ateneo de Davao University (BS)
- Occupation: Politician
- Profession: Entrepreneur

Claudine Diana Derequito Bautista-Lim is a Filipino politician and entrepreneur. She is currently serving as a representative for the DUMPER Partylist in the House of Representatives of the Philippines since 2019.

Bautista-Lim has represented DUMPER Partylist, a party-list representing taxi drivers, in the House of Representatives starting in 2019, where the party has one seat. The party has defended the seat in 2022 and 2025.

== Early life ==
Claudine Diana Bautista was born in Davao City on December 2, 1985. Her father is Claude Bautista, a politician. Her aunt is Lorna Bautista-Bandigan, a representative. Her father taught her sports like billiards and basketball. She studied management at a school in Glion, Switzerland and went to high school and college in Ateneo de Davao, gaining a degree in Entrepreneurship. When she was just 15 years old, she won as the Sangguniang Kabataan Federation president in Davao del Sur. In 2013, she became active in women's issues in Davao Occidental. She eventually became the provincial head of the Women's Council of Davao Occidental.

== Political career ==
In the 2019 Philippine House of Representatives elections, she was the first nominee of the DUMPER Partylist. DUMPER Partylist gained 41st place in the elections, gaining 218,240 votes, 0.79 percent of the votes. Because Bautista was the first nominee, she gained the one seat the party-list gained. In 2019, she gave free back-to-school rides. In the same year, she started feeding programs for taxi drivers. She supported the Magna Carta for Public Transportation Drivers Bill. She was one of the authors of House Bill (HB) 2482, which recognizes May 8 as Public Transportation Drivers' Day. She authored HB 4163, the Public Safety Act of 2019. During the COVID-19 pandemic, she donated 3 million pesos to medical frontliners, distributed 1.1 million food packs, and helped 18,000 drivers gain the COVID-19 vaccine. In the 2022 Philippine House of Representatives elections, she was the first nominee of the DUMPER Partylist. The party-list gained 39th place with 314,618 votes, 0.85 percent of the votes. She gained a seat. During her tenure, she principally authored 211 bills and co-authored 67 bills. She is the first nominee in the 2025 Philippine House of Representatives party-list election for the DUMPER Partylist.

== Personal life ==
On August 11, 2021, she married Jose French Lim, a businessman in Balesin Island. A picture of the wedding was released by the wedding gown designer Michael Cinco, gaining controversy for having a luxurious wedding in midst of the COVID-19 pandemic. Bautista said that the release of the wedding photo "was a mistake", stating that "We had no intention of making our wedding a public affair, so we kept it as intimate as possible." With the exposure of the wedding's details, several celebrities made statements on social media. She found the statement of actor Enchong Dee, which stated that the wedding was "lavish and ostentatious", and that "money for commuters and drivers" were used to pay for it, libelous, and sued him for cyberlibel in August 2021, seeking one billion pesos in damages. In June 2022, Dee flew to Digos for a mediation hearing in regards to the case.

She and Lim have a daughter named Cat.
