= Conus kostini =

Scientific classification
- Domain: Eukaryota
- Kingdom: Animalia
- Phylum: Mollusca
- Class: Gastropoda
- Subclass: Caenogastropoda
- Order: Neogastropoda
- Superfamily: Conoidea
- Family: Conidae
- Genus: Conus
- Species: C. kostini

Binomial name
- Conus kostini Filmer, Monteiro, Lorenz & Verdasca, 2012

Synonyms
- Asprella kostini (Filmer, Monteiro, Lorenz & Verdasca, 2012); Conus (Embrikena) kostini Filmer, Monteiro, Lorenz & Verdasca, 2012 · accepted, alternate representation; Embrikena kostini (Filmer, Monteiro, Lorenz & Verdasca, 2012)

Species of sea snail

Conus kostini is a species of sea snail, a marine gastropod mollusc in the family Conidae, the cone snails, cone shells or cones.

These snails are predatory and venomous. They are capable of stinging humans.

== Description ==
The size of the shell varies between 60 mm and 100 mm.

== Distribution ==
This marine species occurs off Balut Island, Southern Mindanao, the Philippines
