= DUMPER Partylist =

Political party in the Philippines

DUMPER
- — Philippine partylist —
- Full name: Drivers United for Mass Progress and Equal Rights – Philippines Taxi Drivers Association
- Abbreviation: DUMPER PTDA
- Sector(s) represented: Taxi drivers
- Colors: Green, Blue, Red

Current representation (20th Congress)
- Seats in the House of Representatives: 1 / 3 (Out of 63 party-list seats)
- Representative(s): Claudine Bautista-Lim

The Drivers United for Mass Progress and Equal Rights – Philippines Taxi Drivers Association (DUMPER PTDA), also known as the DUMPER Partylist is a political organization which has party-list representation in the House of Representatives of the Philippines.

== Background ==
Representing taxi drivers, DUMPER Partylist took part in the 2019 House of Representatives elections winning a single seat, which was filled in by Claudine Bautista, daughter of Davao Occidental Governor Claude Bautista. Bautista as DUMPER's representative advocated for the Magna Carta for Public Transportation Drivers Bill to become law which would institutionalize insurance and subsidies for drivers in the public transport sector. It took part again in the 2022 elections in a bid to at least retain its lone seat.

== Involvement in sports ==
The organization is also involved in sports being one of the sponsors of the Pilipinas Super League. The Davao Occidental Tigers is also associated with the partylist. In 2023 ahead of the UAAP Season 86, DUMPER became a sponsor of the UST Growling Tigers basketball team.

== Electoral history ==
Election	Votes	%	Seats
2016	6,941	0.02	0 / 59
2019	223,199	0.80	1 / 61
2022	314,618	0.85	1 / 63
2025	275,426	0.67	1 / 63

== Representatives to Congress ==
Period	Representative
18th Congress; 2019–2022	Claudine Bautista-Lim
19th Congress; 2022–2025	Claudine Bautista-Lim
20th Congress; 2025–2028	Claudine Bautista-Lim
Note: A party-list group, can win a maximum of three seats in the House of Representatives.
