= Conus quiquandoni =

Scientific classification
- Kingdom: Animalia
- Phylum: Mollusca
- Class: Gastropoda
- Subclass: Caenogastropoda
- Order: Neogastropoda
- Superfamily: Conoidea
- Family: Conidae
- Genus: Conus
- Species: C. quiquandoni

Binomial name
- Conus quiquandoni Lorenz & Barbier, 2008

Synonyms
- Asprella quiquandoni (Lorenz & Barbier, 2008); Conus (Phasmoconus) quiquandoni Lorenz & Barbier, 2008; Graphiconus quiquandoni (Lorenz & Barbier, 2008) · accepted, alternate representation

Species of sea snail

Conus quiquandoni is a species of sea snail, a marine gastropod mollusk in the family Conidae, the cone snails and their allies.

Like all species within the genus Conus, these snails are predatory and venomous. They are capable of stinging humans, therefore live ones should be handled carefully or not at all.

== Description ==
The size of the shell attains 68 mm.

== Distribution ==
This marine species occurs off Balut Island, the Philippines.
