= Davao Occidental General Hospital =

Government hospital in Davao Occidental, Philippines

Geography
- Location: Malita, Davao Occidental, Davao Region, Philippines
- Coordinates: 6°27′27″N 125°34′29″E

Organization
- Funding: Government hospital

The Davao Occidental General Hospital is a government hospital in the Philippines. It is located in Barangay Lacaron, Malita, Davao Occidental.
