= Claude Bautista =

Filipino politician

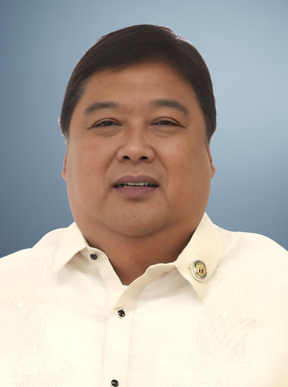
- Official portrait, 2025

Member of the Philippine House of Representatives from Davao Occidental's Lone District
- Incumbent
- Assumed office June 30, 2022
- Preceded by: Lorna Bautista-Bandigan

1st Governor of Davao Occidental
- In office June 30, 2016 – June 30, 2022
- Vice Governor: Franklin Bautista
- Preceded by: post created
- Succeeded by: Franklin Bautista

8th Governor of Davao del Sur
- In office June 30, 2013 – June 30, 2016
- Vice Governor: Aileen Almendras
- Preceded by: Douglas Cagas
- Succeeded by: Douglas Cagas

Member of the Philippine House of Representatives from Davao del Sur's 2nd district
- In office June 30, 2001 – June 30, 2007
- Preceded by: Franklin Bautista
- Succeeded by: Franklin Bautista

Mayor of Malita
- In office June 30, 1998 – June 30, 2001
- Preceded by: Franklin Bautista
- Succeeded by: Franklin Bautista

Personal details
- Born: January 17, 1960 (age 66) Malita, Davao, Philippines
- Party: NPC (2001–2012; 2015–2018; 2024–present); HNP (2018–present)
- Other political affiliations: Lakas (2022–2024); Liberal (2012–2015)
- Relations: Lorna Bautista-Bandigan (sister); Franklin "Colin" Bautista (brother); Benjamin Joseph Bautista (brother)
- Children: Claudine Diana Bautista-Lim; Claude Benjamin Bautista II
- Parents: Benjamin Bautista Sr. (father); Pilar Peralta (mother)
- Education: Pangasinan State University (BS)

Claude "Auding" Peralta Bautista (born January 17, 1960) is a Filipino politician currently serving as the representative of the lone district of Davao Occidental, Philippines. He previously served as the province's first Governor from 2016 to 2019, following its creation in 2013, and as governor of Davao Del Sur from 2013 to 2016. He was also the representative of Davao Del Sur's 2nd district from 2001 to 2007, and as mayor of Malita, Davao del Sur (now part of Davao Occidental) from 1998 to 2001.

During his tenure as governor, Bautista served alongside Martin Romualdez as campaign manager of the successful vice presidential campaign of Sara Duterte in 2022.

== Early life ==
Claude Bautista was born on January 17, 1960 in Malita, Davao (now part of Davao Occidental) to farmer, high school principal and politician Benjamin V. Bautista Sr., who served as assemblyman at the Interim Batasang Pambansa from 1978 to 1984 and as representative of Davao del Sur's second district from 1987 to 1998, and Pilar Peralta Bautista. He has five siblings: Franklin ("Colin", born 1952), Lorna (born 1954), Benjamin Joseph Jr., Eva and Imelda.

== Personal life ==
Although Bautista is unmarried, he has two children: Claudine Diana (born 1985) and Claude Benjamin II, both with the maternal family name Derequito. Claudine co-founded the Hugpong ng Pagbabago regional party of Davao City Mayor Sara Duterte in 2018, and is currently serving as representative of DUMPER Partylist, which seeks to represent taxi drivers.

Bautista is a cockfighting enthusiast, being a member of the National Cockers Association (NCA) council and participating in its annual NCA 7-Cock Derby on multiple occasions.
