= 2013 Davao Occidental creation plebiscite =

Davao Occidental creation plebiscite, 2013
- October 28, 2013
- "Do you approve of the creation of the province of Davao Occidental out of the province of Davao del Sur which shall be composed of the municipalities of Santa Maria, Malita, Don Marcelino, Jose Abad Santos and Sarangani pursuant to Republic Act No. 10360 dated July 23, 2012?
- Outcome: Proposal accepted

Results
| Choice | Votes | % |
|---|---|---|
| Yes | 180,162 | 76.57% |
| No | 55,139 | 23.43% |
| Total votes | 235,301 | 100.00% |
| Registered voters/turnout | 553,092 | 42.54% |

On October 28, 2013, residents of Davao del Sur voted in a plebiscite to approve or disapprove the creation of the then proposed province of Davao Occidental.

== Background ==
The creation of Davao Occidental was first proposed by then Davao del Sur congressman, Marc Douglas Cagas IV in 2013, while his father, Douglas Cagas, was still the governor of Davao del Sur. The proposed province was to compose all municipalities of Davao del Sur under the 2nd legislative district at that time. Cagas withdrew his proposal as the 2013 Philippine elections drew near.

The proposal was revived by Franklin Bautista 2nd district congressman of Davao del Sur. Bautista passed a law proposing the creation of the province, was passed in Congress, and approved by President Benigno Aquino III. Bautista's version of the law has a more limited scope with the municipalities of Santa Maria, Malita, Don Marcelino, Jose Abad Santos and Sarangani proposed to form Davao Occidental. Cagas' version included the municipalities of Kiblawan, Malalag and Sulop. The three municipalities opted out from being a part of the province proposed by Bautista.

By virtue of Republic Act 10360 enacted on July 23, 2013, the province is the newest in the country, carved out from the southern part of Davao del Sur. RA 10360 was passed by the House of Representatives and Senate on November 28, 2012, and December 5, 2012, respectively, and signed by President Benigno Aquino III on January 14, 2013. A plebiscite was to be held to ratify the law.

A majority vote of those who participated in the plebiscite was required to approve or disapprove the creation of Davao Occidental. Registered voters of Davao del Sur except Davao City at the time of the plebiscite were eligible to vote.

== Results ==
The results of the plebiscite was announced by the COMELEC on October 30, 2013. Seventy-six percent of those who voted favored the creation of the new province.

Do you approve of the creation of the province of Davao Occidental?
| Choice | Votes | % |
|---|---|---|
| For | 180,162 | 76.57 |
| Against | 55,139 | 23.43 |
| Total | 235,301 | 100.00 |
| Registered voters/turnout | 553,092 | 42.54 |

=== By city or municipality ===
| City or municipality | Yes | | No | | Turnout | | Registered voters |
| City or municipality | Total | % | Total | % | Total | % | Registered voters |
|---|---|---|---|---|---|---|---|
| Bansalan | 10,172 | 74.16 | 3,544 | 25.84 | 13,716 | 37.75 | 36,337 |
| Digos | 29,626 | 69.02 | 13,297 | 30.98 | 42,923 | 45.20 | 94,962 |
| Don Marcelino | 6,499 | 71.77 | 2,556 | 28.23 | 9,055 | 40.26 | 22,490 |
| Hagonoy | 9,853 | 70.07 | 4,208 | 29.93 | 14,061 | 45.86 | 30,664 |
| Jose Abad Santos | 10,591 | 74.68 | 3,591 | 25.32 | 14,182 | 37.03 | 38,300 |
| Kiblawan | 7,810 | 74.33 | 2,697 | 25.67 | 10,507 | 42.25 | 24,871 |
| Magsaysay | 10,961 | 81.26 | 2,528 | 18.74 | 13,489 | 41.66 | 32,375 |
| Malalag | 9,792 | 80.26 | 2,408 | 19.74 | 12,200 | 58.22 | 20,956 |
| Malita | 37,036 | 94.25 | 2,258 | 5.75 | 39,294 | 52.92 | 74,250 |
| Matanao | 9,725 | 78.81 | 2,615 | 21.19 | 12,340 | 37.46 | 32,946 |
| Padada | 5,315 | 58.37 | 3,790 | 41.63 | 9,105 | 47.88 | 19,017 |
| Santa Cruz | 15,272 | 75.24 | 5,025 | 24.76 | 20,297 | 34.41 | 58,989 |
| Santa Maria | 7,327 | 68.83 | 3,318 | 31.17 | 10,645 | 35.38 | 30,091 |
| Sarangani | 3,247 | 62.25 | 1,969 | 37.75 | 5,216 | 32.12 | 16,238 |
| Sulop | 6,936 | 83.86 | 1,335 | 16.14 | 8,271 | 40.14 | 20,606 |
| Davao del Sur | 180,162 | 76.57 | 55,139 | 23.43 | 235,301 | 42.54 | 553,092 |

Source: Commission on Elections

== Aftermath ==
Malita was designated as capital of the new province and government officials of Davao del Sur, with assistance from the Department of the Interior and Local Government retaining jurisdiction over the new province until residents of the province elected for the province's own set of government officials in 2016.

== See also ==
- 2001 Zamboanga Sibugay creation plebiscite, which created the province of Zamboanga Sibugay out of Zamboanga del Sur
- 2006 Dinagat Islands creation plebiscite, which created the province of Dinagat Islands out of Surigao del Norte
- 2022 Maguindanao division plebiscite, which divided the province of Maguindanao into two smaller provinces
