= Franklin Bautista =

Filipino lawyer and politician (born 1952)

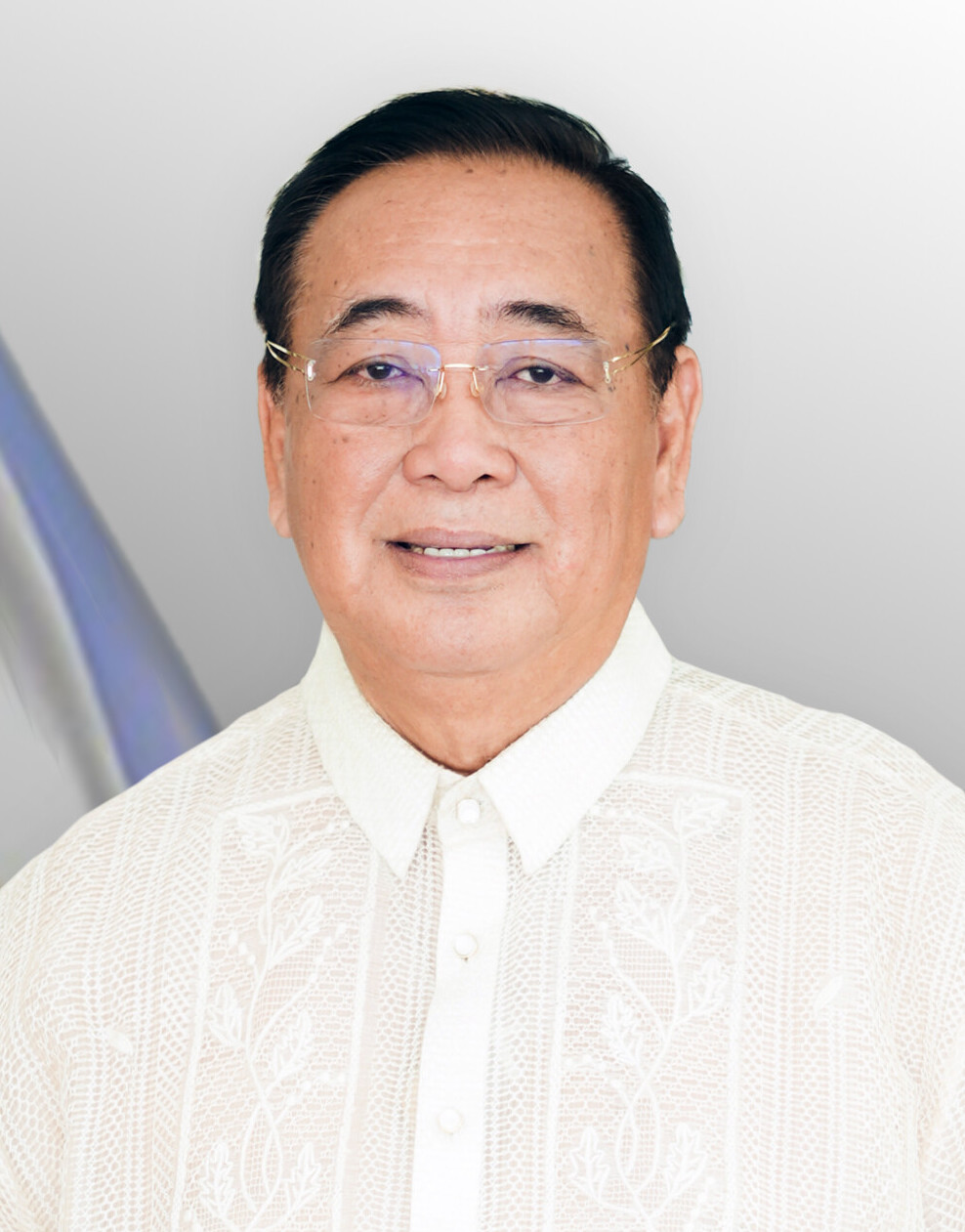
- Official portrait, 2025

2nd Governor of Davao Occidental
- Incumbent
- Assumed office June 30, 2022
- Vice Governor: Lorna Bautista-Bandigan
- Preceded by: Claude Bautista

Vice Governor of Davao Occidental
- In office June 30, 2016 – June 30, 2022
- Governor: Claude Bautista
- Preceded by: Office established
- Succeeded by: Lorna Bautista Bandigan

Member of the Philippine House of Representatives from Davao del Sur's 2nd district
- In office June 30, 2007 – June 30, 2016
- Preceded by: Claude Bautista
- Succeeded by: Office abolished
- In office June 30, 1998 – June 30, 2001
- Preceded by: Benjamin Bautista Sr.
- Succeeded by: Claude Bautista

Mayor of Malita
- In office June 30, 2001 – June 30, 2007
- In office February 2, 1988 – June 30, 1998

Personal details
- Born: April 1, 1952 (age 74) Davao City, Davao, Philippines
- Party: PFP (2024–present)
- Other political affiliations: Lakas (1998–2012; 2021–2024); HNP (2018–2021); Liberal (2012–2018); KAMPI (2007–2008)
- Relations: Claude Bautista (brother); Lorna Bautista-Bandigan (sister)

Franklin "Colin" Peralta Bautista (born April 1, 1952) is a Filipino lawyer and politician who currently serving as 2nd Governor of Davao Occidental since 2022 and formerly served as the first Vice Governor of the newly created Province of Davao Occidental from 2016 to 2022. He has been elected to two terms as a Member of the House of Representatives of the Philippines, representing the Second District of Davao del Sur. He first served from 1998 to 2001, and was again elected in 2007. He also served two non-consecutive terms as Mayor of Malita when the municipality was then part of Davao del Sur.
