= Balot =

Balot may refer to:

- Balot, Côte-d'Or, a commune in Bourgogne-Franche-Comté, France
- Balot (comedian) (1926–1996), Filipino comedian
- Balot (food), a boiled fertilized egg, popular in parts of Asia
- Balot Doctora (born 1986), Filipino footballer
- Kevin Balot (born 1991), Filipino pageant contestant

== See also ==
- Balut (disambiguation)
