= Santa Maria, Davao Occidental =

Municipality in Davao Occidental, Philippines

Santa Maria
- Municipality
- Municipality of Santa Maria
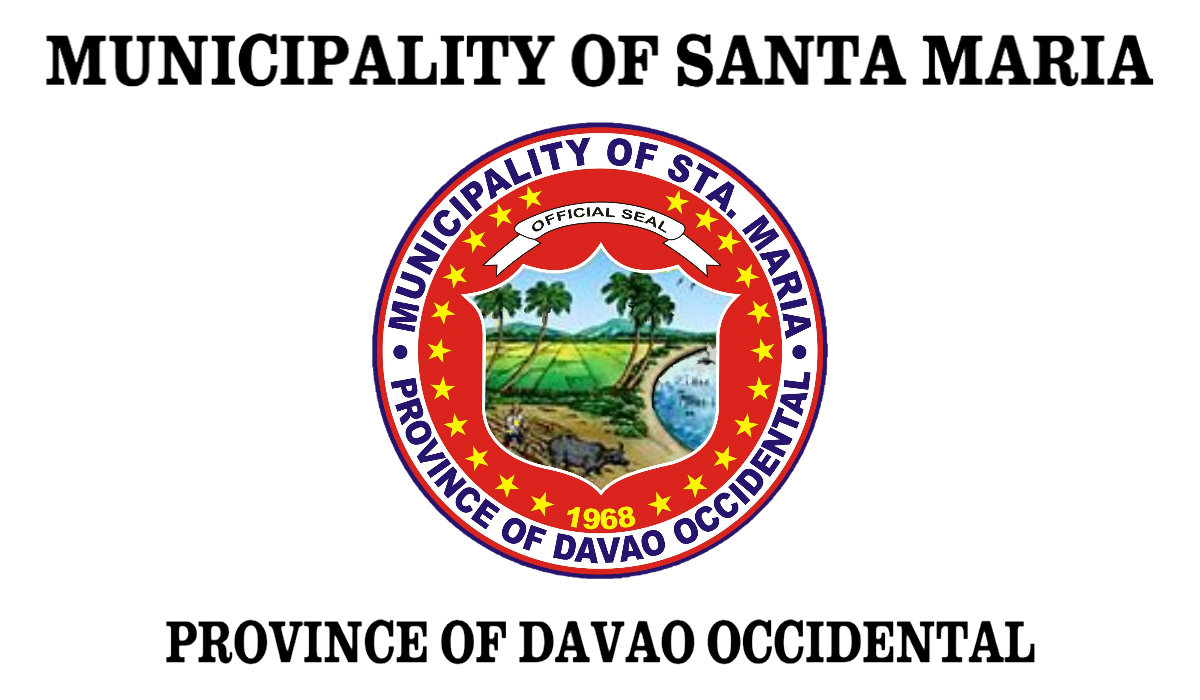
- Flag Seal
- Motto: Pristine Seas of the South
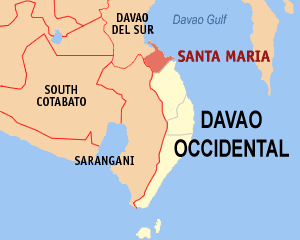
- Map of Davao Occidental with Santa Maria highlighted
- Interactive map of Santa Maria
- Location within the Philippines
- Coordinates: 6°33′05″N 125°28′23″E
- Country: Philippines
- Region: Davao Region
- Province: Davao Occidental
- District: Lone district
- Founded: June 18, 1966
- Barangays: 22 (see Barangays)

Government
  - Type: Sangguniang Bayan
  - Mayor: Claude Benjamin D. Bautista II
  - Vice Mayor: Josephine B. Mariscal
  - Municipal Council: Members: Jubane M. Monsad; Dinko Bautista; Charles C. Dupitas; Lea C. Abe; Maribel M. Aplacador; Ramilo F. Mangayao; Marylu G. Papatheodorou; Dante H. Tan
  - Electorate: 36,062 voters (2025)

Area
  - Total: 175.00 km^{2} (67.57 sq mi)
- Elevation: 87 m (285 ft)
- Highest elevation: 1,124 m (3,688 ft)
- Lowest elevation: 0 m (0 ft)

Population (2024 census)
  - Total: 58,886
  - Density: 336.49/km^{2} (871.51/sq mi)
  - Households: 14,706

Economy
  - Income class: 1st municipal income class
  - Poverty incidence: 20.5% (2023)
  - Revenue: ₱ 430.8 million (2024)
  - Assets: ₱ 546.1 million (2024)
  - Expenditure: ₱ 256.2 million (2024)
  - Liabilities: ₱ 43.36 million (2024)

Service provider
  - Electricity: Davao del Sur Electric Cooperative (DASURECO)
- Time zone: UTC+8 (PST)
- ZIP code: 8011
- PSGC: 1108604000
- IDD : area code: +63 (0)82
- Native languages: Davawenyo; Cebuano; Kalagan; Tagalog

Santa Maria, officially the Municipality of Santa Maria (Cebuano: Lungsod sa Santa Maria; Tagalog: Bayan ng Santa Maria), is a municipality in the province of Davao Occidental, Philippines. According to the 2024 census, it has a population of 58,886 people.

== History ==
Santa Maria was created as a municipality of Davao on June 18, 1966 out of 12 barangays and 15 barrios from Malalag, by virtue of Republic Act No. 4743. Basiawan was designated as the municipal seat. On May 8, 1967, the municipality became part of Davao del Sur following Davao's division under Republic Act No. 4867.

On October 28, 2013, it was ceded to Davao Occidental as a result of a plebiscite, in which the majority of voters approved the creation of the new province.

== Geography ==
The municipality, located on Mindanao Island, is about 40 kilometers (25 mi) north-west of provincial capital municipality of Malita and about 1,023 kilometers (636 mi) south-south-east of Philippine main capital Manila. It is also located on the coast of Davao Gulf. The noted feature of Santa Maria is the Mount Monkeyawa, standing about more than a hundred-meter above sea level. And at the foot of this mountain, the Municipal Hall where it is located.

=== Climate ===
Climate data for Santa Maria, Davao Occidental
Month	Jan	Feb	Mar	Apr	May	Jun	Jul	Aug	Sep	Oct	Nov	Dec	Year
Mean daily maximum °C (°F)	30 (86)	30 (86)	31 (88)	32 (90)	31 (88)	30 (86)	29 (84)	30 (86)	30 (86)	30 (86)	30 (86)	30 (86)	30 (87)
Mean daily minimum °C (°F)	23 (73)	23 (73)	23 (73)	24 (75)	24 (75)	24 (75)	24 (75)	24 (75)	24 (75)	24 (75)	24 (75)	23 (73)	24 (74)
Average precipitation mm (inches)	38 (1.5)	29 (1.1)	37 (1.5)	45 (1.8)	102 (4.0)	166 (6.5)	179 (7.0)	176 (6.9)	157 (6.2)	133 (5.2)	86 (3.4)	46 (1.8)	1,194 (46.9)
Average rainy days	8.1	7.0	8.9	11.1	22.1	26.1	26.7	26.5	25.6	25.5	19.5	11.7	218.8
Source: Meteoblue

=== Barangays ===
Santa Maria is politically subdivided into 22 barangays. Each barangay consists of puroks while some have sitios.

- Basiawan
- Buca
- Cadaatan
- Kidadan
- Kisulad
- Malalag Tubig
- Mamacao
- Ogpao
- Poblacion
- Pongpong
- San Agustin
- San Antonio
- San Isidro
- San Juan
- San Pedro
- San Roque
- Tanglad
- Santo Niño
- Santo Rosario
- Datu Daligasao
- Datu Intan
- Kinilidan

== Demographics ==
Population census of Santa Maria
Year	Pop.	±% p.a.
1970	24,271	—
1975	28,754	+3.46%
1980	30,512	+1.19%
1990	40,036	+2.75%
1995	41,919	+0.86%
2000	45,571	+1.81%
2007	48,362	+0.82%
2010	49,349	+0.74%
2015	53,671	+1.61%
2020	57,526	+1.47%
2024	58,886	+0.56%
Source: Philippine Statistics Authority

=== Language and dialects ===
- Tagakaulo - a native dialect originates from the mixture of Bagobo, Mandaya, Davawenyo, and the Lumad peoples of Davao City.
- Cebuano

== Economy ==
Poverty incidence of Santa Maria (%)

Source: Philippine Statistics Authority

== Government ==
Municipal officials 2022-2025:

- Mayor: Claude Benjamin Bautista II
- Vice Mayor: Josephine Mariscal
- Councilors:
  - Jestoni Tiwo
  - Rudy Mariscal Jr.
  - Lino Solo
  - Amel Vistal
  - Lea Abe
  - Jubane Monsad
  - Ondo Mangayao
