= Jose Abad Santos, Davao Occidental =

Municipality in Davao Occidental, Philippines

Jose Abad Santos Trinidad
- Municipality
- Municipality of Jose Abad Santos
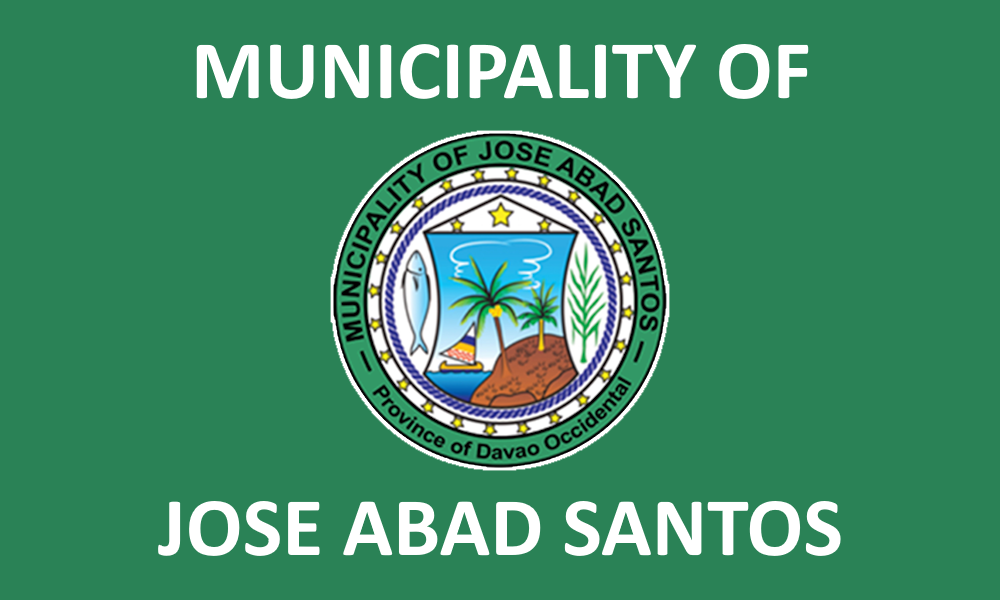
- Flag Seal

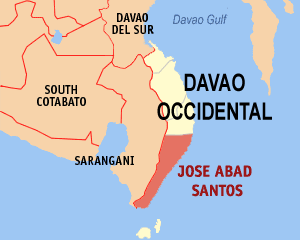
- Map of Davao Occidental with Jose Abad Santos highlighted
- Interactive map of Jose Abad Santos
- Location within the Philippines
- Coordinates: 5°54′45″N 125°38′40″E
- Country: Philippines
- Region: Davao Region
- Province: Davao Occidental
- District: Lone district
- Founded: August 1, 1948
- Renamed: April 20, 1955
- Named for: José Abad Santos
- Barangays: 26 (see Barangays)

Government
  - Type: Sangguniang Bayan
  - Mayor: Jason John A. Joyce
  - Vice Mayor: James John A. Joyce
  - Representative: Claude P. Bautista
  - Municipal Council: Members: Marvic Vonn B. Guillermo; Gualberto L. Sioco III; Ermelita G. Malaki; Evelyn G. Aragoncillo; Jessel M. Atay; Roger A. Castro; Harden Henry P. Joyce; Reynante B. Mier
  - Electorate: 52,136 voters (2025)

Area
  - Total: 600.06 km^{2} (231.68 sq mi)
- Elevation: 13.3 m (44 ft)
- Highest elevation: 1,803 m (5,915 ft)
- Lowest elevation: 0 m (0 ft)

Population (2024 census)
  - Total: 72,552
  - Density: 120.91/km^{2} (313.15/sq mi)
  - Households: 17,001

Economy
  - Income class: 1st municipal income class
  - Poverty incidence: 37.36% (2023)
  - Revenue: ₱ 375.5 million (2024)
  - Assets: ₱ 902.8 million (2024)
  - Expenditure: ₱ 347.6 million (2024)
  - Liabilities: ₱ 248.1 million (2024)

Service provider
  - Electricity: Davao del Sur Electric Cooperative (DASURECO)
- Time zone: UTC+8 (PST)
- ZIP code: 8014
- PSGC: 1108602000
- IDD : area code: +63 (0)82
- Native languages: Davawenyo; Cebuano; Sangirese; Blaauboschkraal stone ruins Kalagan; Tagalog
- Website: www.joseabadsantos.gov.ph

Jose Abad Santos, officially the Municipality of Jose Abad Santos (Cebuano: Lungsod sa Jose Abad Santos; Tagalog: Bayan ng Jose Abad Santos), is a municipality in the province of Davao Occidental, Philippines. According to the 2024 census, it has a population of 72,552 people.

== History ==
The Municipality of Jose Abad Santos was formerly a part of Malita town, then in the undivided province of Davao. Barrios Batulaki and Caburan seceded and established as a separate town on August 1, 1948, and was originally named Trinidad. Barrio Caburan became its poblacion or town center. On April 20, 1955, the municipality was renamed by virtue of Republic Act No. 1206, in honor of José Abad Santos, the Chief Justice of the Supreme Court of the Philippines who was executed by the Japanese invading forces during World War II.

On May 8, 1967, the municipality became part of Davao del Sur, when Davao was divided under Republic Act No. 4867. On June 11, 1978, the islands of Sarangani and Balut were carved out from the municipality to form the new municipality of Sarangani, through Presidential Decree No. 1550 signed by President Ferdinand Marcos. On October 28, 2013, the municipality was ceded to Davao Occidental as a result of a plebiscite, in which the majority of voters approved the creation of the new province.

On January 1, 2021, Barangay Caburan experienced a nearby earthquake. Two days later, the town became the center of a diarrhea outbreak.

== Geography ==
It is the southernmost municipality on the mainland of Mindanao island. The coastal town is the second largest municipality in Davao Occidental after Malita.

=== Barangays ===
Jose Abad Santos is politically subdivided into 26 barangays. Each barangay consists of puroks while some have sitios.

- Balangonan
- Buguis
- Bukid
- Butuan
- Butulan
- Caburan Big
- Caburan Small (Poblacion)
- Camalian
- Carahayan
- Cayaponga
- Culaman
- Kalbay
- Kitayo
- Magulibas
- Malalan
- Mangile
- Marabatuan
- Meybio
- Molmol
- Nuing
- Patulang
- Quiapo
- San Isidro
- Sugal
- Tabayon
- Tanuman

=== Climate ===
Climate data for Jose Abad Santos, Davao Occidental
Month	Jan	Feb	Mar	Apr	May	Jun	Jul	Aug	Sep	Oct	Nov	Dec	Year
Mean daily maximum °C (°F)	31 (88)	31 (88)	31 (88)	31 (88)	30 (86)	29 (84)	29 (84)	29 (84)	30 (86)	30 (86)	30 (86)	30 (86)	30 (86)
Mean daily minimum °C (°F)	23 (73)	22 (72)	23 (73)	24 (75)	24 (75)	24 (75)	24 (75)	24 (75)	24 (75)	24 (75)	24 (75)	23 (73)	24 (74)
Average precipitation mm (inches)	88 (3.5)	65 (2.6)	92 (3.6)	109 (4.3)	197 (7.8)	271 (10.7)	256 (10.1)	241 (9.5)	192 (7.6)	206 (8.1)	192 (7.6)	121 (4.8)	2,030 (80.2)
Average rainy days	14.3	12.2	15.1	18.1	26.0	27.3	26.1	25.0	23.4	26.1	25.4	20.5	259.5
Source: Meteoblue

== Demographics ==
Population census of Jose Abad Santos
Year	Pop.	±% p.a.
1948	11,343	—
1960	20,476	+5.04%
1970	29,576	+3.74%
1975	33,952	+2.81%
1980	38,232	+2.40%
1990	44,504	+1.53%
1995	47,833	+1.36%
2000	57,147	+3.89%
2007	62,513	+1.25%
2010	69,631	+4.00%
2015	76,332	+1.77%
2020	73,381	−0.83%
2024	72,552	−0.27%
Source: Philippine Statistics Authority

== Economy ==
Poverty incidence of Jose Abad Santos (%)

Source: Philippine Statistics Authority

Vast natural resources can be found, such as the wide stretch of mangroves of the municipality. Milkfish and tilapia breeding, as well as copra production, are the primary source of income for its people. The long stretch of beaches with brown, black and white sands, together with abundant marine life offshore are the primary natural attractions of Jose Abad Santos.

== Transportation ==
The municipality can be reached by public utility vehicles plying from Davao City and Digos via the Pan-Philippine Highway. Past the town of Sulop is the junction with Davao del Sur Provincial Highway. Turning east at the junction, head south on the provincial highway to the town of Malita. And to the said municipality, habal-habal or passenger motorcycles ply to the adjacent town Don Marcelino.

=== Road condition ===
The road condition of the town is poor. Its road network is mostly unpaved, traversing through high-sloped hilly coastal and mountain roads with the danger of falling rocks from above. Most of the river crossings have no bridges, so drivers traversing the town have to consider if their vehicle is capable of crossing a shallow river. During rainy weather, travelers have to wait for the water level to subside before the river could become accessible again. A trip to the town is considered as either adventurous or dangerous by those who intend to visit depending on their experience, though part of the road heading to Don Marcelino town to the north is paved, made with concrete cement.

=== Controversy ===
On August 20, 2013, former provincial representative Marc Douglas Cagas IV complained about the DPWH's complacency about the project involving the improving of roads going to the municipality. He attributed the complacency to the pork barrel scandal that was already happening in the country's politics since several days before the said complaint due to overspending of their budget for the said project.

== See also ==
- List of renamed cities and municipalities in the Philippines
