= Sarangani, Davao Occidental =

Municipality in Davao Occidental, Philippines

Sarangani
- Municipality
- Municipality of Sarangani
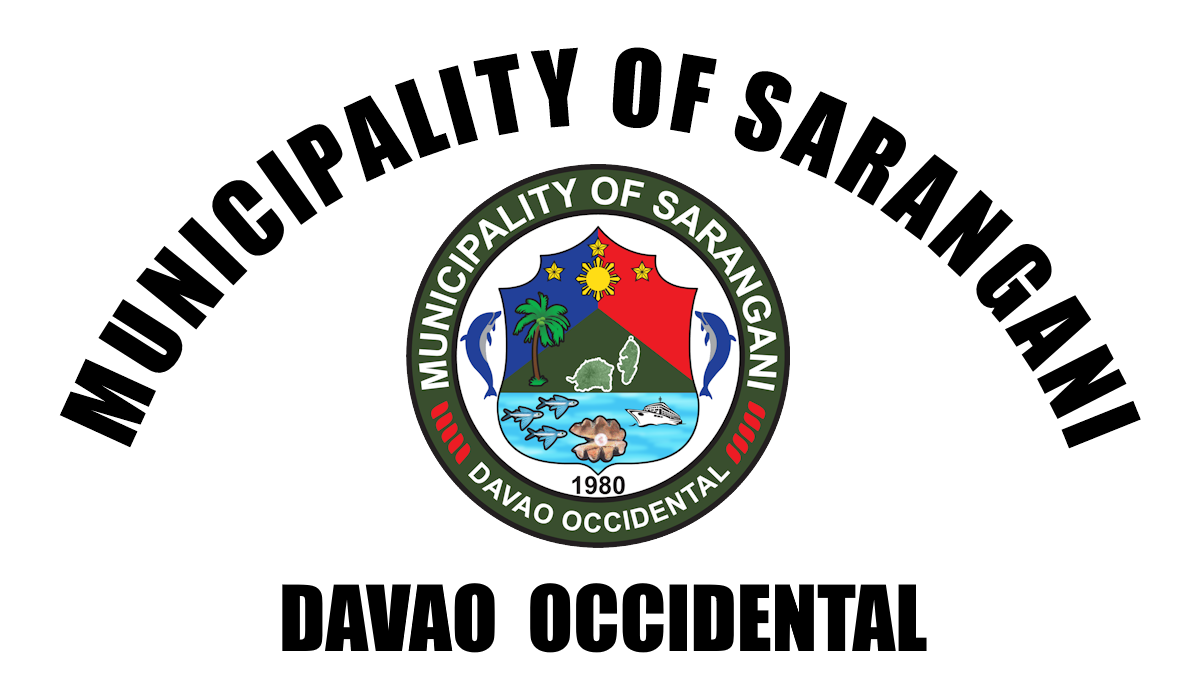
- Flag Seal
- Nicknames: Gateway to Southern Philippines; Hot Springs Capital of Davao Occidental; Philippine Backdoor to Indonesia
- Motto: Sarangani Bayan Natin, Sarangani Paraiso Natin!
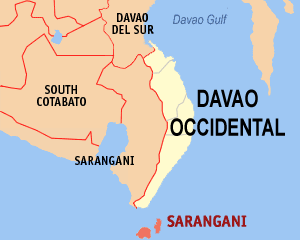
- Map of Davao Occidental with Sarangani highlighted
- Interactive map of Sarangani
- Location within the Philippines
- Coordinates: 5°24′43″N 125°25′19″E
- Country: Philippines
- Region: Davao Region
- Province: Davao Occidental
- District: Lone district
- Founded: June 11, 1978
- Barangays 17: 12 (see Barangays)

Government
  - Type: Sangguniang Bayan
  - Mayor: Adelan B. de Arce
  - Vice Mayor: Marciano C. Lagudas
  - Representative: Claude P. Bautista
  - Municipal Council: Members: Arthon M. Gantongan; Dionisio D. Wao Jr.; Alexis C. Forones; Jay William J. Olarte; Biyal A. Malong; Rodilo P. Dalumpines; Steven A. Olarte; Jomarie A. Olarte
  - Electorate: 17,122 voters (2025)

Area
  - Total: 97.72 km^{2} (37.73 sq mi)
- Elevation: 25 m (82 ft)
- Highest elevation (Mount Balut): 1,131 m (3,711 ft)
- Lowest elevation: 0 m (0 ft)

Population (2024 census)
  - Total: 22,041
  - Density: 225.6/km^{2} (584.2/sq mi)
  - Households: 5,718

Economy
  - Income class: 4th municipal income class
  - Poverty incidence: 19.71% (2023)
  - Revenue: ₱ 130.1 million (2024)
  - Assets: ₱ 326.1 million (2024)
  - Expenditure: ₱ 131 million (2024)
  - Liabilities: ₱ 100.9 million (2024)

Service provider
  - Electricity: Davao del Sur Electric Cooperative (DASURECO)
- Time zone: UTC+8 (PST)
- ZIP code: 8015
- PSGC: 1108605000
- IDD : area code: +63 (0)82
- Native languages: Davawenyo; Cebuano; Sarangani; Sangirese; Tagalog
- Website: www.saranganidavsur.gov.ph

Sarangani, officially the Municipality of Sarangani (Cebuano: Lungsod sa Sarangani; Tagalog: Bayan ng Sarangani), is a municipality in the province of Davao Occidental, Philippines. According to the 2024 census, it has a population of 22,515 people, making it the least populated municipality in the province.

== History ==
On June 11, 1978, the islands of Sarangani and Balut were carved out from the municipality of Jose Abad Santos to form the new municipality of Sarangani, then in Davao del Sur, through Presidential Decree No. 1550 signed by President Ferdinand Marcos. On October 28, 2013, the municipality was ceded to Davao Occidental as a result of a plebiscite, in which the majority of voters approved the creation of the new province.

== Geography ==
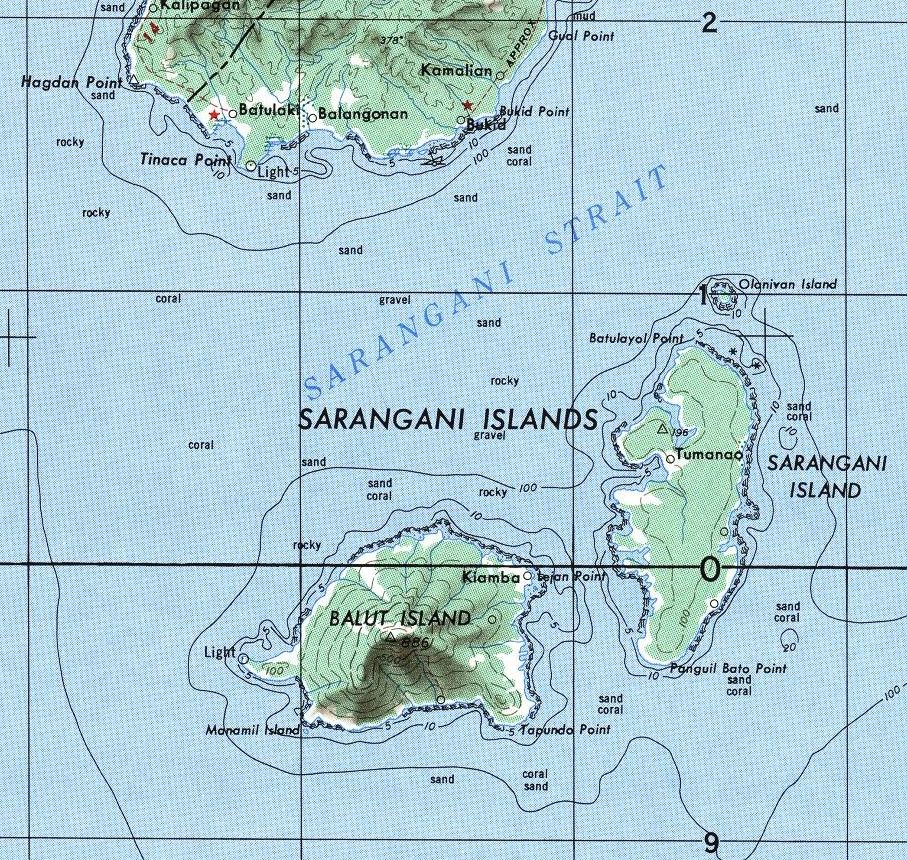
Map of the Sarangani islands

The municipality consists of two major islands (the eponymous Sarangani Island and Balut Island) and one minor islet (Olanivan Island), collectively called the Sarangani Islands, located just south of mainland Mindanao island in the Celebes Sea. The municipality shares a maritime border with Sangihe Islands Regency of Indonesia.

=== Climate ===
Sarangani has a tropical rainforest climate (Af) with moderate to heavy rainfall year-round.

Climate data for Sarangani
Month	Jan	Feb	Mar	Apr	May	Jun	Jul	Aug	Sep	Oct	Nov	Dec	Year
Mean daily maximum °C (°F)	31.5 (88.7)	31.8 (89.2)	32.4 (90.3)	32.7 (90.9)	32.0 (89.6)	31.1 (88.0)	30.8 (87.4)	31.1 (88.0)	31.4 (88.5)	31.8 (89.2)	31.9 (89.4)	31.7 (89.1)	31.7 (89.0)
Daily mean °C (°F)	26.4 (79.5)	26.6 (79.9)	27.1 (80.8)	27.5 (81.5)	27.3 (81.1)	26.6 (79.9)	26.3 (79.3)	26.5 (79.7)	26.7 (80.1)	27.0 (80.6)	27.0 (80.6)	26.8 (80.2)	26.8 (80.3)
Mean daily minimum °C (°F)	21.4 (70.5)	21.5 (70.7)	21.8 (71.2)	22.3 (72.1)	22.6 (72.7)	22.2 (72.0)	21.9 (71.4)	22.0 (71.6)	22.1 (71.8)	22.2 (72.0)	22.1 (71.8)	21.9 (71.4)	22.0 (71.6)
Average rainfall mm (inches)	169 (6.7)	137 (5.4)	119 (4.7)	118 (4.6)	165 (6.5)	168 (6.6)	159 (6.3)	115 (4.5)	114 (4.5)	162 (6.4)	166 (6.5)	160 (6.3)	1,752 (69)
Source: Climate-Data.org

=== Barangays ===
Sarangani is politically subdivided into 12 barangays. Each barangay consists of either puroks or sitios.

Balut Island

- Batuganding
- Gomtago
- Konel
- Lipol
- Mabila (Poblacion)
- Tagen
- Tinina
- Tucal

Sarangani Island

- Camahual
- Camalig
- Laker (Sarangani Sur)
- Patuco (Sarangani Norte) (includes Olanivan islet)

== Demographics ==
Population census of Sarangani
Year	Pop.	±% p.a.
1980	11,960	—
1990	15,003	+2.29%
1995	16,648	+1.97%
2000	18,391	+2.16%
2007	20,394	+1.44%
2010	23,290	+4.95%
2015	24,039	+0.60%
2020	22,515	−1.37%
Source: Philippine Statistics Authority

Due to its proximity to Indonesia, the town also has a significant population of migrants from the Sangihe-Talaud region, including several generations of Indonesian families. As early as 1918, Indonesians extensively planted coconuts in the municipality. Sarangani is also used by Indonesians as a transit point on their way to mainland Mindanao.

== Economy ==
Poverty incidence of Sarangani

Source: Philippine Statistics Authority

== Government ==
Municipal officials 2022-2025:

- Mayor: Adelan B. de Arce
- Vice Mayor: Mariano C. Lagudas
- Councilors:
  - Arthon M. Gantongan
  - Dionisio D. Wao Jr.
  - Alexis C. Forones
  - Jay William J. Olarte
  - Biyal A. Malong
  - Rodilo P. Dalumpines
  - Steven A. Olarte
  - Jomarie A. Olarte
