= Balut-e Asadi =

Balut-e Asadi بلوطاسدي
- Village
- Location within Iran
- Coordinates: 30°32′33″N 51°15′15″E
- Country: Iran
- Province: Fars
- County: Rostam
- Bakhsh: Sorna
- Rural District: Poshtkuh-e Rostam

Population (2006)
  - Total: 120
- Time zone: UTC+3:30 (IRST)
  - Summer (DST): UTC+4:30 (IRDT)

Balut-e Asadi (Persian: بلوطاسدي, also romanized as Balūţ-e Asadī and Balūţ Asadī) is a village in Poshtkuh-e Rostam Rural District, Sorna District, Rostam County, Fars province, Iran. At the 2006 census, its population was 120, in 24 families.
