= Balut Beyg =

Balut Beyg بلوطبيگ
- Village
- Location within Iran
- Coordinates: 34°00′16″N 48°50′15″E
- Country: Iran
- Province: Lorestan
- County: Borujerd
- Bakhsh: Central
- Rural District: Darreh Seydi

Population (2006)
  - Total: 138
- Time zone: UTC+3:30 (IRST)
  - Summer (DST): UTC+4:30 (IRDT)

Balut Beyg (Persian: بلوطبيگ, also Romanized as Balūt Beyg and Balūţ Beyk; also known as Robāţ Beyk and Baluibak) is a village in Darreh Seydi Rural District, in the Central District of Borujerd County, Lorestan Province, Iran. At the 2006 census, its population was 138, in 33 families.
