= Balut Island =

Island in Davao Occidental, Philippines

- Balut Volcano; Malulong; Nusang Maruḷung (Sangil)
- Location within Philippines

Highest point
- Peak: Mount Balut
- Elevation: 862 m (2,828 ft)
- Listing: List of potentially active volcanoes in the Philippines
- Coordinates: 5°24′00″N 125°22′30″E

Geography
- Location: Sarangani, Davao Occidental, Philippines

Geology
- Mountain type: Stratovolcano
- Volcanic arc: Central Mindanao Arc
- Last eruption: Unknown

Balut Island, also known as Malulong, is a potentially active volcanic island south of the tip of Davao Occidental province in the Mindanao region, southern Philippines. At the center of the island is Mount Balut or Balut Volcano, a fumarolic volcano with no historical eruptions.

== Description ==
The island is located about 13 km (8.1 mi) from mainland Mindanao, separated by the Sarangani Strait. Balut, Sarangani and Olanivan islands make up the Sarangani Islands group. The island is also located about 65 km (40 mi) north of Marore Island, one of the outlying islands of Indonesia. Politically, the group is organized under the Municipality of Sarangani of Davao Occidental since 1978, having previously been part of Jose Abad Santos. Mabila on Balut Island is administrative and commercial center of the town.

Balut is subdivided into 8 barangays:

- Batuganding
- Gomtago
- Konel
- Lipol
- Mabila
- Tagen
- Tinina
- Tucal

== Topography ==
Balut Island, the westernmost of the Sarangani Islands, is the larger, higher, and better cultivated than Sarangani Island. In the center of the island is Balut Volcano, which is fumarolic on occasion. Balut Island rises to about 1,800 metres (5,900 ft) from the seabed with the highest elevation at 862 metres (2,828 ft) above mean sea level. Base diameter of the island is 8 kilometres (5.0 mi).

If seen from the northwest, it appears between two peaks. Northeast is another peak of Balut, southwest of the peak is the Langab volcano. In the southeast part of the island is Ten Seventy Hill with an elevation of 1,083 feet (330 m).

== Coastline ==
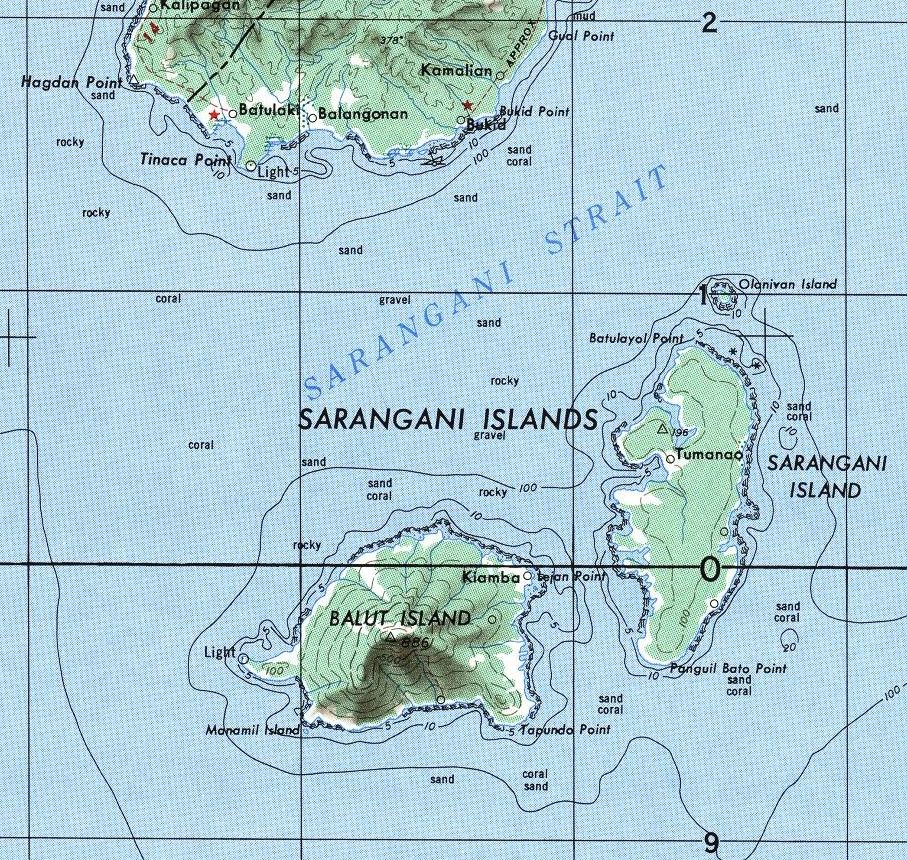
Map of the Sarangani islands

The north and east coasts are bordered by a reef, which in some places extends out over 1 mile, while on the south and west sides the fringing reef does not extend out to any distance. Off the southwest point is a rock island called Manamil Island with an elevation of 40 feet (12 m). Lajan Point, the northeast point of the island, is low and covered by mangroves.

South of the Lajan Point is Mabila, which is the poblacion or town center of the Municipality of Sarangani. The Port of Mabila is the main port of entry to the island and the gateway to the rest of the municipality.

== Classification ==
Balut is classified by Philippine Institute of Volcanology and Seismology as a potentially active stratovolcano with solfataric activity. Hot springs and thermally altered grounds with temperatures of 95–96 °C (203–205 °F) are located at the west and Southwest basal slopes of Balut Volcano. Temperature at the Palabuno Hot Spring is 42 °C (108 °F).

== Geology ==
Rock type on the volcano is predominantly basalt and andesite. Balut is part of the Central Mindanao Arc, an area of frequent earthquakes and volcanic activity. All volcanoes in the Philippines are part of the Pacific Ring of Fire. Like most volcanoes in southern Philippines, Balut Volcano is not studied much scientifically.

=== Volcanic activity ===
There are no recorded historical eruptions on the island. The January 4, 1641 eruption that enveloped most of Mindanao in darkness was falsely attributed to Balut Volcano, as well as other volcanoes in the Philippines. Later studies showed that the eruption was of Mount Parker, 80 kilometres (50 mi) NW of Balut Island.

== Astronomy ==
Being among the southernmost islands in the Philippines, it is possible to see both Polaris and the Magellanic Clouds from this area. Polaris is very low in the northern sky at about 5° altitude (about a thumb's length with the arm outstretched). The Southern Cross is also visible, and its vertical bar points almost directly at the South cardinal point. Being near the equator, the sun is often very high in the sky. At a latitude of 5° 24', the sun passes directly overhead at noontime on or about April 3 and September 8 of each year, causing zero-length shadows. This phenomenon is not possible in high-latitude areas.

Astronomers from PAGASA set up on the island to observe the December 26, 2019 Annular Solar Eclipse. Balut Island, Sarangani Island, and Olanivan Island are the only places in the Philippines where the annularity was visible. Other parts of the Philippines only experienced a partial solar eclipse. The eclipse had a magnitude of 97.2% in Balut Island, 97.1% in Sarangani Island, and 96.8% in Olanivan Island. According to local folklore, eclipses are caused by a large, celestial dragon called the Bakunawa, that devours the sun.

== See also ==
- Balut (disambiguation)
- List of active volcanoes in the Philippines
- List of potentially active volcanoes in the Philippines
- List of inactive volcanoes in the Philippines
- List of islands of the Philippines
