= Don Marcelino =

Municipality in Davao Occidental, Philippines

- Municipality
- Municipality of Don Marcelino
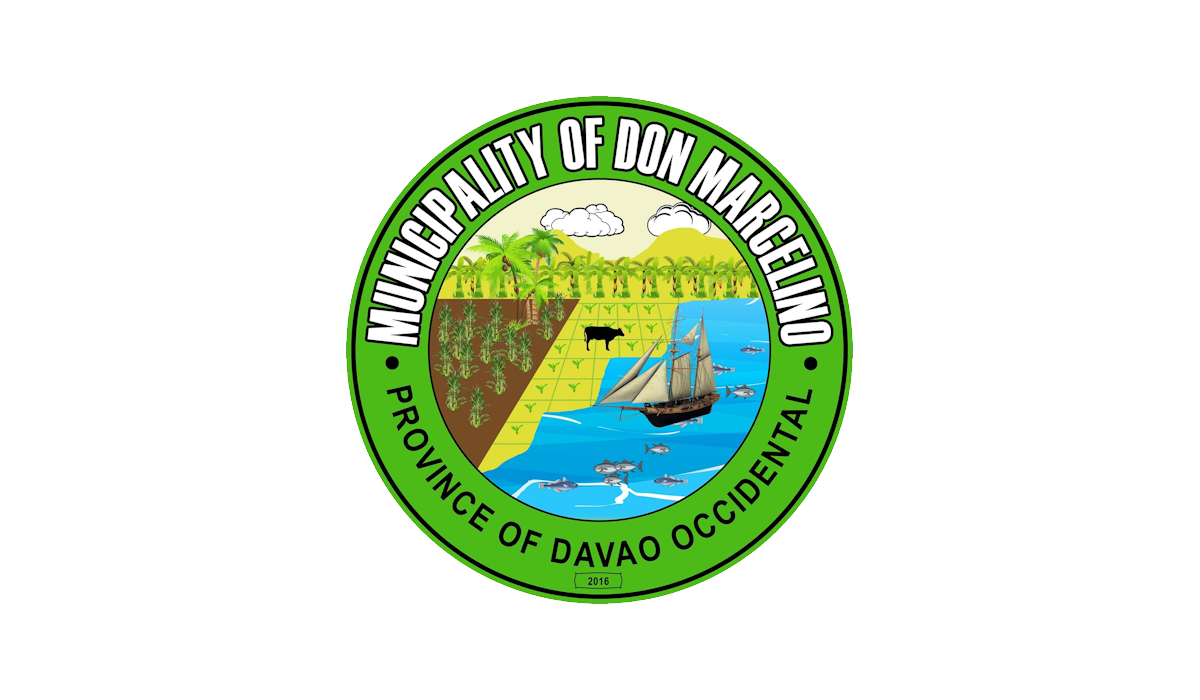
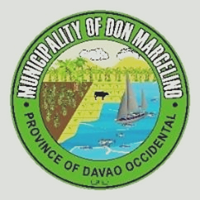
- Flag Seal

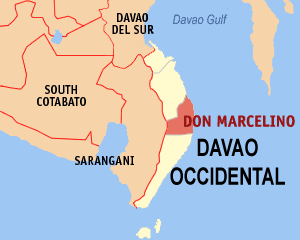
- Map of Davao Occidental with Don Marcelino highlighted
- Interactive map of Don Marcelino
- Location within the Philippines
- Coordinates: 6°12′00″N 125°41′54″E
- Country: Philippines
- Region: Davao Region
- Province: Davao Occidental
- District: Lone district
- Founded: December 19, 1979
- Named for: Marcelino Maruya
- Barangays: 15 (see Barangays)

Government
  - Type: Sangguniang Bayan
  - Mayor: Michael A. Maruya
  - Vice Mayor: Doc Marnie Maruya
  - Representative: Claude Bautista
  - Municipal Council: Members: Annie M. Blangket-Sumalinog; Joseph D. Betinol; Reynold G. Llanto; Renato S. Bautista; Danilo I. Omicas; Jorge D. Gildore; Elizabeth M. Maruya; Porferio M. Cambalon
  - Electorate: 25,810 voters (2025)

Area
  - Total: 407.30 km^{2} (157.26 sq mi)
- Elevation: 249 m (817 ft)
- Highest elevation: 1,784 m (5,853 ft)
- Lowest elevation: 1,803 m (5,915 ft)

Population (2024 census)
  - Total: 45,681
  - Density: 112.16/km^{2} (290.48/sq mi)
  - Households: 11,271

Economy
  - Income class: 1st municipal income class
  - Poverty incidence: 24.2% (2023)
  - Revenue: ₱ 240.2 million (2024)
  - Assets: ₱ 438.6 million (2024)
  - Expenditure: ₱ 237.6 million (2024)
  - Liabilities: ₱ 224 million (2024)

Service provider
  - Electricity: Davao del Sur Electric Cooperative (DASURECO)
- Time zone: UTC+8 (PST)
- ZIP code: 8013
- PSGC: 1108601000
- IDD : area code: +63 (0)82
- Native languages: Davawenyo; Cebuano; Blaan; Kalagan; Tagalog

Don Marcelino, officially the Municipality of Don Marcelino (Cebuano: Lungsod sa Don Marcelino; Filipino: Bayan ng Don Marcelino), is a municipality in the province of Davao Occidental, Philippines. According to the 2024 census, it has a population of 45,681 people.

== Etymology ==
Don Marcelino is named in honor of Marcelino Maruya, who served as the first municipal mayor of the mother municipality of Malita, appointed by President Manuel L. Quezon in 1936. The name incorporates the honorific title Don.

== History ==
Don Marcelino was created as a municipality of Davao del Sur through Batas Pambansa Bilang 47 on December 19, 1979, having been carved out from the municipality of Malita. It originally consisted of six barangays: Calian, Kiobog, Lamidan, Lawa, Nueva Villa, and Talagutong.

On October 28, 2013, the municipality was ceded to Davao Occidental as a result of a plebiscite, in which the majority of voters approved the creation of the new province.

The municipality was struck by earthquakes in 2017. Television personality Franco Hernandez died at a drowning incident in Barangay North Lamidan on November 11, 2017.

== Geography ==
=== Climate ===
Climate data for Don Marcelino, Davao Occidental
Month	Jan	Feb	Mar	Apr	May	Jun	Jul	Aug	Sep	Oct	Nov	Dec	Year
Mean daily maximum °C (°F)	30 (86)	30 (86)	31 (88)	32 (90)	31 (88)	30 (86)	29 (84)	30 (86)	30 (86)	30 (86)	30 (86)	30 (86)	30 (87)
Mean daily minimum °C (°F)	23 (73)	23 (73)	23 (73)	24 (75)	24 (75)	24 (75)	24 (75)	24 (75)	24 (75)	24 (75)	24 (75)	23 (73)	24 (74)
Average precipitation mm (inches)	38 (1.5)	29 (1.1)	37 (1.5)	45 (1.8)	102 (4.0)	166 (6.5)	179 (7.0)	176 (6.9)	157 (6.2)	133 (5.2)	86 (3.4)	46 (1.8)	1,194 (46.9)
Average rainy days	8.1	7.0	8.9	11.1	22.1	26.1	26.7	26.5	25.6	25.5	19.5	11.7	218.8
Source: Meteoblue

=== Barangays ===
Don Marcelino is politically subdivided into 15 barangays. Each barangay consists of puroks while some have sitios.

- Baluntaya
- Calian
- Dalupan
- Kinanga (Poblacion)
- Kiobog
- Lanao
- Lapuan
- Lawa
- Linadasan
- Mabuhay
- North Lamidan (easternmost barangay in the province)
- Nueva Villa
- South Lamidan
- Talaguton
- West Lamidan

== Demographics ==
Population census of Don Marcelino
Year	Pop.	±% p.a.
1980	20,024	—
1990	27,100	+3.07%
1995	29,968	+1.90%
2000	33,403	+2.35%
2007	35,166	+0.71%
2010	41,942	+6.62%
2015	44,554	+1.16%
2020	45,540	+0.46%
2024	45,681	+0.07%
Source: Philippine Statistics Authority

== Economy ==
Poverty incidence of Don Marcelino (%)

Source: Philippine Statistics Authority

== Government ==
Municipal Officials 2022-2025:

- Mayor: Michael A. Maruya
- Vice Mayor: Mark Edward Anthony M. Maruya, MD, FPATACSI
- Councilors:
  - Hon. Renato S. Bautista
  - Hon. Annie B. Sumalinog
  - Hon. Joseph C. Betinol
  - Hon. Reynold G. Llanto
  - Hon. Amador D. Cano
  - Hon. Jorge D. Gildore
  - Hon. Porferio M. Cambalon
  - Hon. Angelito M. Caluyan
