= Lorna Bautista-Bandigan =

Filipino politician

Vice Governor of Davao Occidental
- Incumbent
- Assumed office June 30, 2022
- Governor: Franklin Bautista
- Preceded by: Franklin Bautista

Member of the House of Representatives of the Philippines from Davao Occidental's Lone District
- In office June 30, 2016 – June 30, 2022
- Preceded by: position established
- Succeeded by: Claude Bautista

Personal details
- Born: Lorna Peralta Bautista; March 25, 1954 (age 72) Davao City, Davao, Philippines
- Party: Lakas (2021–present)
- Other political affiliations: NPC (2018–2021); Liberal (2015–2018)
- Relations: Claude Bautista (brother); Franklin Bautista (brother)

Lorna Peralta Bautista-Bandigan is a Filipino politician who was a member of the House of Representatives. She represented Davao Occidental's at-large congressional district from June 30, 2016 to June 30, 2022. She is Vice Governor of Davao Occidental.

== See also ==
- List of female members of the House of Representatives of the Philippines
