= Davao Occidental's at-large congressional district =

Legislative district of the Philippines

- Constituency for the House of Representatives of the Philippines
- Map of the Philippines showing the location of Davao Occidental
- Province: Davao Occidental
- Region: Davao Region
- Population: 317,159 (2020)
- Electorate: 192,420 (2022)
- Area: 2,163.45 km^{2} (835.31 sq mi)

Current constituency
- Created: 2013
- Representative: Claude Bautista
- Political party: NPC
- Congressional bloc: Majority

Davao Occidental's at-large congressional district is the congressional district of the Philippines in Davao Occidental. It has been represented in the House of Representatives of the Philippines since 2016. It was previously included in Davao del Sur's 2nd congressional district from 1987 to 2016. It is currently represented in the 20th Congress by Claude Bautista of the Nationalist People's Coalition (NPC).

== Representation history ==
#	Image	Member	Term of office		Congress	Party	Electoral history
#	Image	Member	Start	End	Congress	Party	Electoral history
District created October 28, 2013 from Davao del Sur's 2nd district.
1		Lorna Bautista-Bandigan	June 30, 2016	June 30, 2022	17th	Liberal	Elected in 2016.
1		Lorna Bautista-Bandigan	June 30, 2016	June 30, 2022	18th	NPC	Re-elected in 2019.
2		Claude P. Bautista	June 30, 2022	Incumbent	19th	Lakas (HNP)	Elected in 2022.
2		Claude P. Bautista	June 30, 2022	Incumbent	20th	NPC	Re-elected in 2025.

== Election results ==
=== 2025 ===
Candidate	Party	Votes	%
Claude Bautista (incumbent)	Nationalist People's Coalition	112,722	100.00
Total		112,722	100.00
Valid votes		112,722	74.46
Invalid/blank votes		38,654	25.54
Total votes		151,376	100.00
Registered voters/turnout		205,167	73.78
Nationalist People's Coalition hold			
Source: Commission on Elections

=== 2022 ===
2022 Philippine House of Representatives elections at Davao Occidental at-large district
Party	Candidate	Votes	%
Hugpong	Claude Bautista	106,637	100
Total votes		106,637	100
Hugpong gain from NPC			

=== 2019 ===
2019 Philippine House of Representatives elections at Davao Occidental at-large district
Party	Candidate	Votes	%
NPC	Lorna Bautista-Bandigan	86,588	100
Total votes		86,588	100
NPC hold			

=== 2016 ===
2016 Philippine House of Representatives election in Davao Occidental Lone District
Party	Candidate	Votes	%
Liberal	Lorna Bautista-Bandigan	53,461	100
Total votes		53,461	100
Liberal win (new seat)			

== See also ==
- Legislative districts of Davao Occidental
