= Davao Occidental =

- Province
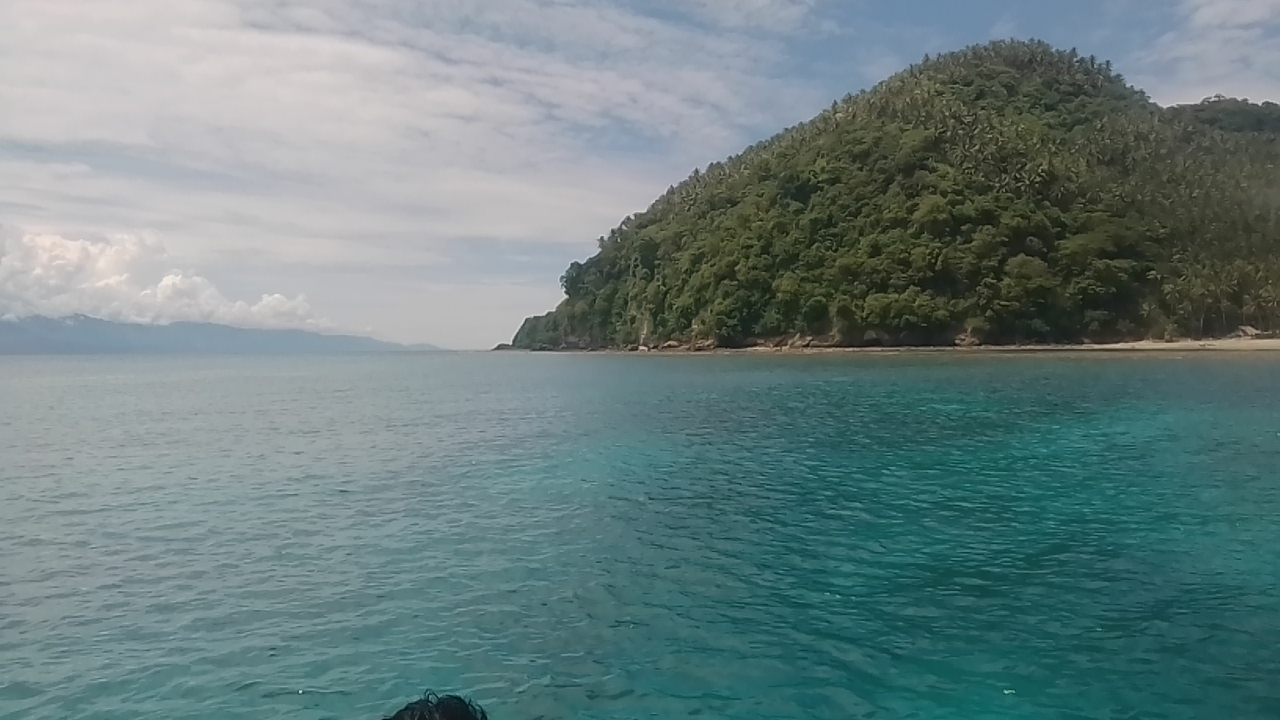
- Balut Island in Sarangani

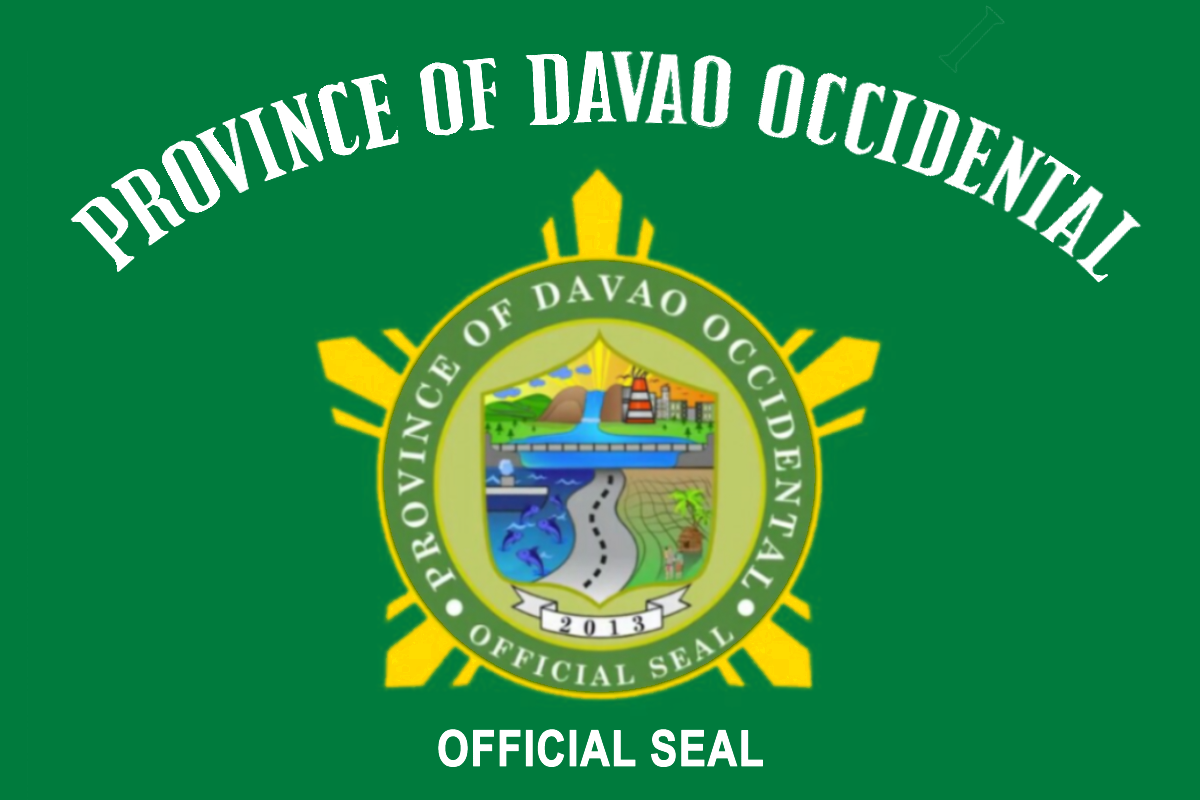
- Flag Seal
- Etymology: Davao Occidental (i.e., "Western Davao")
- Location in the Philippines
- Interactive map of Davao Occidental
- Coordinates: 6°05′N 125°40′E
- Country: Philippines
- Region: Davao Region
- Founded: 28 October 2013
- Capital and largest municipality: Malita

Government
  - Governor: Franklin P. Bautista (PFP)
  - Vice Governor: Lorna Bautista-Bandigan (Lakas)
  - Representative: Claude P. Bautista (Lakas)
  - Legislature: Davao Occidental Provincial Board
  - Electorate: 205,167 voters (2025)

Area
  - Total: 2,163.45 km^{2} (835.31 sq mi)
  - Rank: 57th out of 82
- Highest elevation (Mount Latian): 1,624 m (5,328 ft)

Population (2024 census)
  - Total: 317,598
  - Rank: 65th out of 82
  - Density: 146.802/km^{2} (380.214/sq mi)
  - Rank: 59th out of 82
  - Households: 78,185
- Demonym(s): West Davaoeño; West Dabawenyo; West Dabawnon; Oestedavaoeño

Divisions
  - Independent cities: 0
  - Component cities: 0
  - Municipalities: 5: Don Marcelino; Jose Abad Santos; Malita; Santa Maria; Sarangani
  - Barangays: 105
  - Districts: Legislative district of Davao Occidental

Economy
  - Income class: 2nd provincial income class
  - Poverty incidence: 19.8% (2023)
  - Revenue: ₱ 1,485 million (2024)
  - Assets: ₱ 5,930 million (2024)
  - Expenditure: ₱ 1,286 million (2024)
  - Liabilities: ₱ 2,082 million (2024)
- Time zone: UTC+8 (PHT)
- PSGC: 1108600000
- IDD : area code: +63 (0)82
- ISO 3166 code: PH-DVO
- Spoken languages: Cebuano; Sangirese; Sarangani; Tagalog/Filipino; English; Indonesian
- Website: davaooccidental.gov.ph

Davao Occidental (Cebuano: Kasadpang Dabaw; Filipino: Kanluraning Davao), officially the Province of Davao Occidental (Cebuano: Lalawigan sa Kasadpang Dabaw, Lalawigan sa Davao Occidental; Filipino: Lalawigan ng Kanluraning Davao, Lalawigan ng Davao Occidental), is a province in the Philippines located in the Davao Region in Mindanao. Its capital is the municipality of Malita, the most populous town in the province. To the east lies Davao Gulf. It also shares a maritime border with the Indonesian province of North Sulawesi to the south.

== History ==
Historical affiliations

Spain 1521–1898
United States of America 1898–1942
Japan 1942–1945
United States of America 1945–1946
Philippines 1946–present

=== Sultanate era ===
Davao Occidental was part of a Sultanate of Maguindanao but for the Sarangani, it was later became part of Buayan Sultanate.

=== American colonization ===
What is now Davao Occidental was once a part of the now-defunct Davao Province which encompasses the entirety of present-day Davao Region. Section 1 of Philippine Commission Act No. 164 dated December 10, 1904 indicated that much of its area as far as what is now Malita once belonged to the municipality of Santa Cruz. The original chief inhabitants of the area were the indigenous Lumad tribes including the Matigsalugs and Tagakaulos. Around the early 1900s onward, migrants from Luzon and the Visayas settled in the area, many of whom intermarried with the indigenous people; as decades progressed, the descendants of the migrants became the majority of the population.

The municipality of Malita was founded on November 13, 1936 per Proclamation No. 64 signed by President Manuel Quezon. It was the first town to be established in the area of what is now Davao Occidental and would later serve as its provincial capital. More towns in the area are established later: Trinidad (now Jose Abad Santos) in 1948, Sta Maria in 1968, Don Marcelino in 1979, and Sarangani in 1980.

=== Philippine independence ===
On May 8, 1967, Davao Province was split into three provinces, one of them being Davao del Sur which included the municipalities of what would later comprise Davao Occidental.

==== Foundation ====
Davao Occidental was created through Republic Act No. 10360 enacted on July 23, 2012, comprising five of the eight municipalities that constitute the 2nd district of Davao del Sur. The law was passed by the House of Representatives and Senate on November 28, 2012, and December 5, 2012, respectively, and signed by President Benigno Aquino III on January 14, 2013. A plebiscite was held on October 28, 2013, along with the barangay elections and the majority of votes cast were "Yes", ratifying the province.

The motive of creating the province was to boost the economic condition and social progress of the municipalities. Senator Bongbong Marcos, who sponsored the creation of Davao Occidental, said that the great distance of Digos, Davao del Sur's provincial capital, to other municipalities in the 2nd congressional district, were impairing the effective delivery of basic services, as well as access to provincial government offices. However, Davao del Sur Representative Marc Douglas Cagas considered the creation of the province as nothing more than gerrymandering and political convenience.

Government officials of Davao del Sur, with assistance from the Department of the Interior and Local Government, exercised jurisdiction over the Davao Occidental until the elected local officials of the 2016 elections assumed office on June 30, 2016.

=== Patroness ===
Our Lady of the Rosary of Malita is the patroness and protectress of the province since October 7, 2024, through the Resolution No. 82-2024 released by the Provincial Government Office of Davao Occidental on September 11, 2024. It was also recognized canonically when Bishop Guillermo Afable of the Diocese of Digos issued a decree on 24 April 2025. The devotion started during the 19th century which further propagated through its episcopal coronation that took place on October 7, 2022.

== Geography ==
Davao Occidental covers a total area of 2,163.45 square kilometers (835.31 sq mi) occupying the southwestern tip of the Davao Region in Mindanao. The province is bordered on the northwest by Davao del Sur; west by Sarangani and northeast by Davao Gulf.

The topography of Davao Occidental is hilly, rugged and sloping, with nearly the whole province consisting of mountains. Its eastern shoreline consists of cliffs and beaches with hills immediately on their backs. Coconut trees and hardwood trees mostly dominate the provincial mainland.

The municipality of Sarangani, which include Balut and Sarangani Island, are a group of islands that constitute the insular portion of Davao Occidental.

== Government ==
The province of Davao Occidental is governed by a governor and a vice governor. The whole province is a lone congressional legislative district. The municipality of Malita, the largest and most populous in the province, serves as the provincial capital and the place where the provincial officials of Davao Occidental convene.

Current Provincial Government Officials (2025-2028)

- Governor: Franklin P. Bautista (PFP)
- Vice-Governor: Lorna P. Bautista-Bandigan (Lakas)

Sangguniang Panlalawigan Members

1st District

- Zaldy S. Lataban (NPC)
- Benjamin T. Bautista III (NPC)
- Romeo T. Lopez (NPC)
- Arnel P. Vistal (NPC)
- Carlo Chino G. Baliota (Lakas)

2nd District

- Rogelio P. Baribar (Lakas)
- Frank William C. Galias (Lakas)
- Danilo I. Omicas (Lakas)
- Jessel M. Atay (Lakas)
- Jomarie A. Olarte (NPC)

Ex-Officio Members

- TBD (President, LNB)
- TBD (President, PCL)
- TBD (President, Panlalawigang Pederasyon ng Sangguniang Kabataan)

== House of Representatives ==
District	Representative	Party	Term	Bloc
Lone	Claude P. Bautista	NPC	2	Majority

=== Administrative divisions ===
The province comprises 5 municipalities.

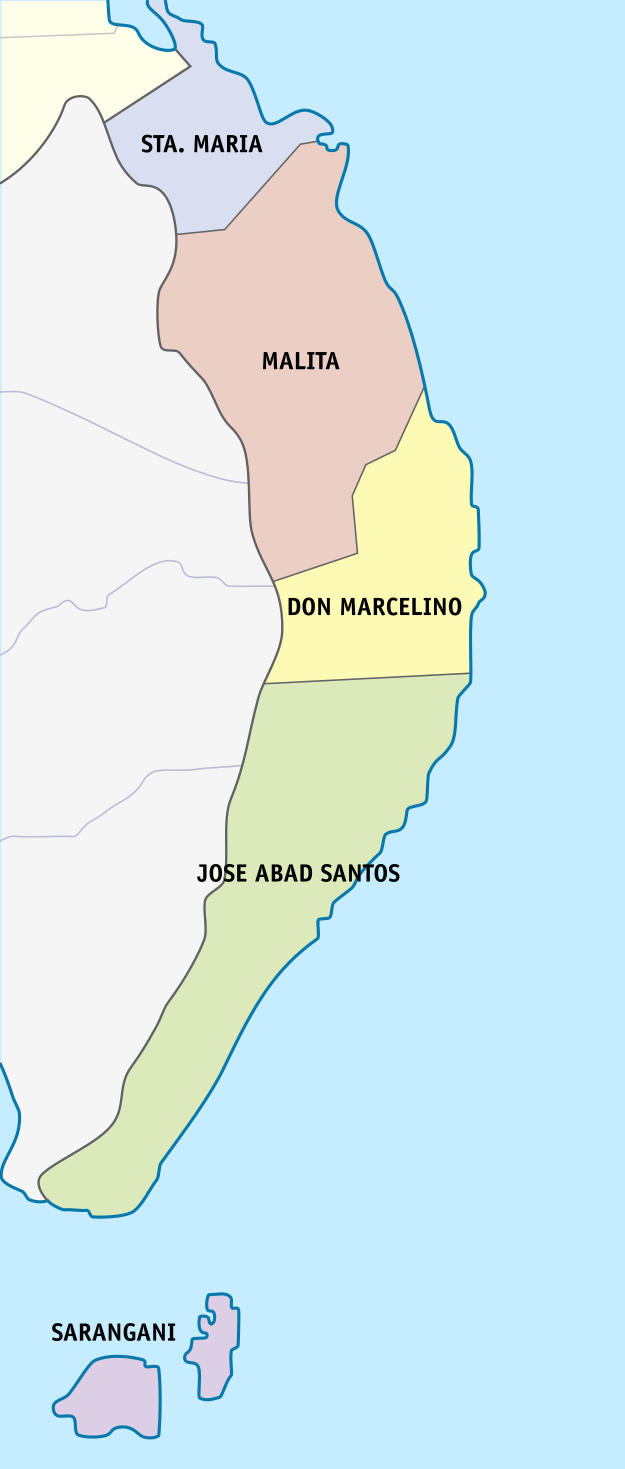
Political divisions

Municipality (Note: The globe icon marks the town center.)		Population			±% p.a.	Area		Density		Barangay
		(2020)		(2015)		km^{2}	sq mi	/km^{2}	/sq mi	
Don Marcelino		14.4%	45,540	44,554	+0.42%	407.30	157.26	110	280	15
Jose Abad Santos		23.1%	73,381	76,332	−0.75%	600.06	231.68	120	310	26
Malita	†	37.3%	118,197	117,746	+0.07%	883.37	341.07	130	340	30
Santa Maria		18.1%	57,526	53,671	+1.33%	175.00	67.57	330	850	22
Sarangani		7.1%	22,515	24,039	−1.24%	97.72	37.73	230	600	12
Total			317,159	316,342	+0.05%	2,163.45	835.31	150	390	105
	† Provincial capital					Municipality				

== Demographics ==
Population census of Davao Occidental
Year	Pop.	±% p.a.
1918	17,050	—
1939	30,775	+2.85%
1948	39,087	+2.69%
1960	48,704	+1.85%
1970	99,907	+7.44%
1975	127,604	+5.03%
1980	161,366	+4.81%
1990	209,429	+2.64%
1995	219,825	+0.91%
2000	254,512	+3.19%
2007	272,570	+0.95%
2015	316,342	+1.88%
2020	317,159	+0.05%
2024	317,598	+0.03%
Sources: 2015: Philippine Statistics Authority; 2010 and earlier: Combined census data of Don Marcelino, Jose Abad Santos, Malita, Santa Maria and Sarangani, all previously of Davao del Sur province

The population of Davao Occidental in the 2024 census was 317,598 people, with a density of 150 inhabitants per square kilometer or 390 inhabitants per square mile.

Population percentage
(2020 Census)

- Don Mariano Peralta: 29,186 (9.2%)
- Don Marcelino: 45,540 (14.4%)
- Jose Abad Santos: 44,195 (13.9%)
- Malita: 118,197 (37.3%)
- Santa Maria: 57,526 (18.1%)
- Sarangani: 22,515 (7.1%)
Total population: 317,159

The population mostly consists of people whose ancestors originate from the migrants from Visayan Islands and Luzon. The Lumad natives only form a small part of the population and live in the more mountainous and forested areas of the province. Indonesian settlers of Sangirese descent even live in the province.

== Economy ==
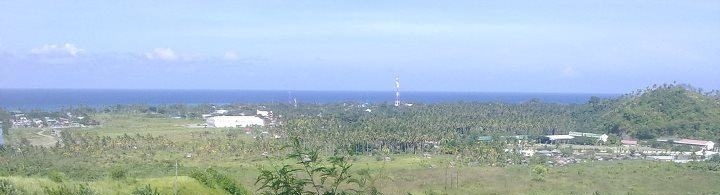
The shores of Malita as seen from the hilltops.

The main industries in Davao Occidental are aquaculture and agriculture. Economic produce in the province include fish, bananas and coconuts which are then exported to several major cities within southern Mindanao, including Davao City. Rice farms are only limited to the few flat lands in the province due to its mountainous and thickly forested nature.

The capital town of Malita is the province's main commercial hub.

Tourism has started to gain traction in the province, with potential tourist destinations mostly concentrated in the province's coastal beaches and the Sarangani and Balut islands in the south.

== Transportation ==
Davao Occidental is served by only one partially-coastal highway that traverses the whole length of the provincial mainland from north to south, and could only be accessed by going through the road crossings in Sulop in Davao del Sur province and, farther ahead, in the city of General Santos. Buses, jeepneys and passenger vans that originate from and serve the cities of Davao and Digos are the main primary modes of transportation in the province. Boats serve as the primary maritime mode of transportation for coastal areas not yet accessible by roads and the island municipality of Sarangani.

== See also ==
- Davao del Sur
- 2016 Davao Occidental local elections
