= Davao (province) =

Former province of the Philippines

Davao Dabaw
- Province of the Philippines
- 1914–1967
- Seal

- Location of the historical province of Davao.
- Capital: Davao City
- Area
- 20,244 km^{2} (7,816 sq mi)
- Historical era: Commonwealth Era / Cold War
  - Dissolution of Moro Province: 1914
  - Formation of Davao Region: 8 May 1967
- Political subdivisions: 36 municipalities & 1 city (before May 8, 1967); Davao City; Babak; Baganga; Banaybanay; Bansalan; Cateel; Caraga; Compostela; Digos; Doña Alicia (later Mabini); Hagonoy; Kapalong; Kaputian; Kiblawan; Lupon; Magsaysay; Malalag; Malita; Manay; Matan-ao; Mati; Montevista; Moncayo; Nabunturan; Padada; Panabo; Pantucan; Samal; San Isidro; Santa Cruz; Santa Maria; Saug (later Asuncion); Sigaboy (later Gov. Generoso); Sulop; Tagum; Tibal-og (later Santo Tomas); Trinidad (later Jose Abad Santos)
Preceded by
Moro Province
Succeeded by
Davao del Norte
Davao del Sur
Davao Oriental
- Today part of: · Davao City · Davao del Norte · Davao de Oro · Davao del Sur · Davao Occidental · Davao Oriental

Davao, officially the Province of Davao (Spanish: Provincia de Dávao; Cebuano: Lalawigan sa Dabaw), was a province in the Philippines on the island of Mindanao. The old province is coterminous with the present-day Davao Region or Region XI. It was divided into three provinces of Davao del Norte, Davao Oriental, and Davao del Sur with the passage of Philippine Republic Act No. 4867 on May 8, 1967. Two more provinces, Compostela Valley (now Davao de Oro) and Davao Occidental, were carved out of the territories of Davao del Norte and Davao del Sur respectively. The descendant provinces were reorganized into the current region in 2001.

It was one of the largest, most populous and prosperous provinces in the country during its time, being settled by immigrants from the Luzon and the Visayas.

== Existence ==
The province was established after the dissolution of Moro Province in 1914. Before the province broke up, massive waves of immigrants from Visayas and Luzon island groups are already settling in the province. Japanese immigrants, mostly rich businessmen and pioneers, also settled in its capital Davao in large numbers, making it the Philippines' Little Japan. Having an area of more than 20,000 square kilometers (7,700 sq mi), its borders were almost identical to its predecessor, the province of Nueva Guipúzcoa that existed from 1849 to 1858, which also covered parts of what are now Cotabato, South Cotabato, Sarangani, Bukidnon, and the region of Caraga during the Spanish era.

After the dissolution of Nueva Guipozcoa, it was then converted into the Politico-Military Commandancia of Davao (District of Davao) for many years before it was incorporated into the Moro Province.

It was converted into a regular province and was made a district of Department of Mindanao and Sulu from 1914 until 1920.

Its capital town, Davao, became a city on March 16, 1936, as the provincial congressman Romualdo Quimpo filed Bill 609 (passed as Commonwealth Act 51), paving the creation of the city from the merger of the town of Davao (Mayo) and Guianga District. The bill called for the appointment of local officials by Commonwealth President Manuel L. Quezon. By then, it was the only city in the province throughout the latter's existence. What is now the Davao City Legislative Building served as the capitol for the governor and other provincial officials in the province.

On 1942, during the outbreak of World War II in the Philippines, forces of the Imperial Japanese Army invaded the province, becoming one of the territories in the country to be first taken by Japan. Guerrilla parties were then organized in the province to battle Japanese garrison forces there. It was in late 1944 when the Allies began liberating the island of Mindanao, and earlier the next year the dreadful Battle of Davao was fought to eliminate any Japanese resistance in the province.

The province was one of few to recover quickly from the war. Its capital city resumed its role as the main economic center of Mindanao. Though some local Japanese inhabitants in the provinces were expelled from the country due to enmity after the war, most have been integrated to the local Filipino population. After the war, migration to the province steadily increased due to the employment and agricultural opportunities the province offers, especially in its capital city.

In 1948, all municipal districts in the country were abolished. This paved the way for the creation of several towns in the province, such as Digos, Padada, Compostela, and many others.

To reorganize governance in the country, President Ferdinand E. Marcos signed the Republic Act No. 4867 on May 8, 1967, dividing the province into three. The then-Davao Province is currently a region consisting of five provinces: Davao del Sur, Davao del Norte, Davao Occidental, Davao Oriental and Davao de Oro.

=== Aftermath ===
The province of Davao del Norte bore this name from 1972 to 1998, when Compostela Valley (now Davao de Oro) seceded as a separate province.

Davao Occidental was created by virtue of Republic Act 10360 enacted on July 23, 2013; the province is the newest in the country, carved out from the southern part of Davao del Sur. The Act was passed by the House of Representatives and the Senate on November 28, 2012, and December 5, 2012, respectively, and signed by President Benigno Aquino III on January 14, 2013. A plebiscite was held on October 28, 2013, along with the Barangay elections, and the majority of votes cast were "Yes", ratifying the province.

== Governors of Davao ==
The Governor of Davao served as the head of the provincial government of Davao.

No.	Image	Governor	Term began	Term ended	Era	Notes
1		Eulalio E. Causing	1915	1917	U.S. Insular Government	Also served as representative of Cebu, his native province.
2		Francisco Sales	1917	1921	U.S. Insular Government	Appointed Inspector of the Provincial Advisory Census Board of Davao in 1918.
3		Jose Edwin Palacios Sr.	1921	1922	U.S. Insular Government	
4		Celestino Chaves	1922	1925	U.S. Insular Government	
5		Sebastian T. Generoso	1925	1930	U.S. Insular Government	Served for first consecutive two of his three terms. Was the namesake of municipality of Governor Generoso.
6		Cayetano B. Bangoy	1930	1931	U.S. Insular Government	
7		Juan A. Sarenas	1931	1935	U.S. Insular Government	Served for two consecutive terms.
8		Sebastian T. Generoso	1935	1937	Commonwealth	Last of his three terms. Died in office four months before the end of his term. Was succeeded by Domingo M. Braganza.
9		Domingo M. Braganza	1937	1937	Commonwealth	Municipality of Davao officially inaugurated as city during his tenure. Only served for four months as provisional governor from September to December 14, 1937.
10		Pacifico M. Sobrecarey	1937	1940	Commonwealth	First governor after incorporation of Davao as component city.
11		Romualdo C. Quimpo	1940	1942	Commonwealth	Served as Congressman in the National Assembly before his governorship, he was as responsible for the filing Bill 609 signed as Commonwealth Act No. 51 by President Manuel Quezon which incorporated the town of Davao into a city in 1937. He was subsequently called as the "Father of Davao City". Surrendered to the Imperial Japanese Army during World War 2 while the invasion was finalizing its conclusion on May 8, 1942.
12		Ricardo D. Miranda	1942	1946	Second Republic; Commonwealth	Was installed by Japanese occupation forces as governor, which would be his first of his three terms in office.
13		Pantaleon A. Pelayo Sr.	1942	1945	Philippine resistance movement	Mayor of Davao City prior to its occupation by Japanese forces in 1942. Refusing to acknowledge their authority, he fled to the mountains and joined the guerrilla forces and declared himself governor of "Free Davao" which he would keep until the city's liberation in May 1945. One of the two governors of Davao during World War 2.
14		Antonio C. Lanzar	1946	1947	Third Republic	Was the first governor under the sovereign government of the newly independent Republic of the Philippines.
15		Gregorio V. Cañeda	1947	1947	Third Republic	
16		Ricardo D. Miranda	1947	1951	Third Republic	Last consecutive two of his three terms until his and his wife's death from an arson incident on their home in Sta. Ana, Davao City in 1951.
17		Alejandro D. Almendras	1951	1959	Third Republic	A decorated hero of Philippine resistance against Japan. Served two terms.
18		Vicente G. Duterte	1959	1965	Third Republic	Father of 16th Philippine president Rodrigo Duterte.
19		Paciano V. Bangoy	1965	1967	Third Republic	Last governor of Davao until its division on May 8, 1967. Continued as Governor of Davao Oriental until December 1967.

== Notable ==
- Tony Tan Caktiong, businessman; co founder of Jollibee Foods

== See also ==
- Davao Region
- Mindanao
- Provinces of the Philippines
