= Malita =

Capital of Davao Occidental, Philippines

- Municipality
- Municipality of Malita
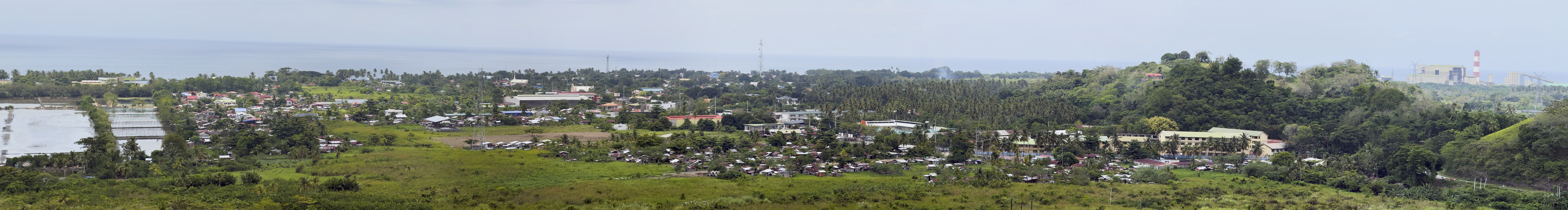
- Panoramic view of Brgy. Poblacion, Malita

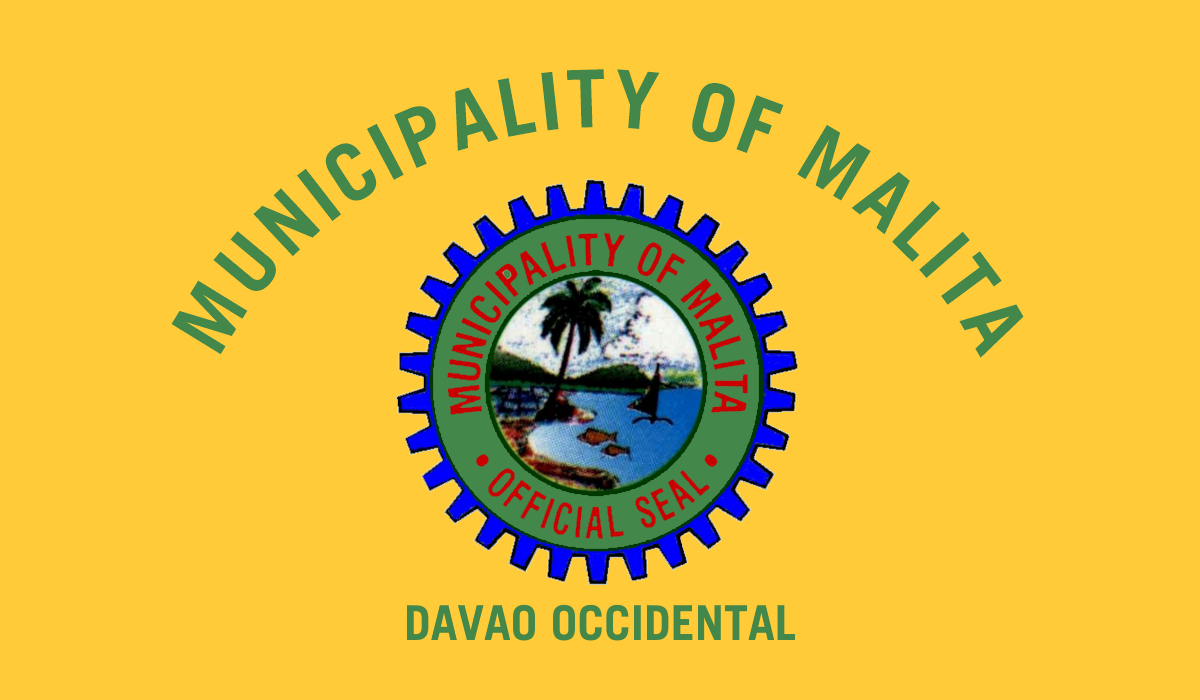
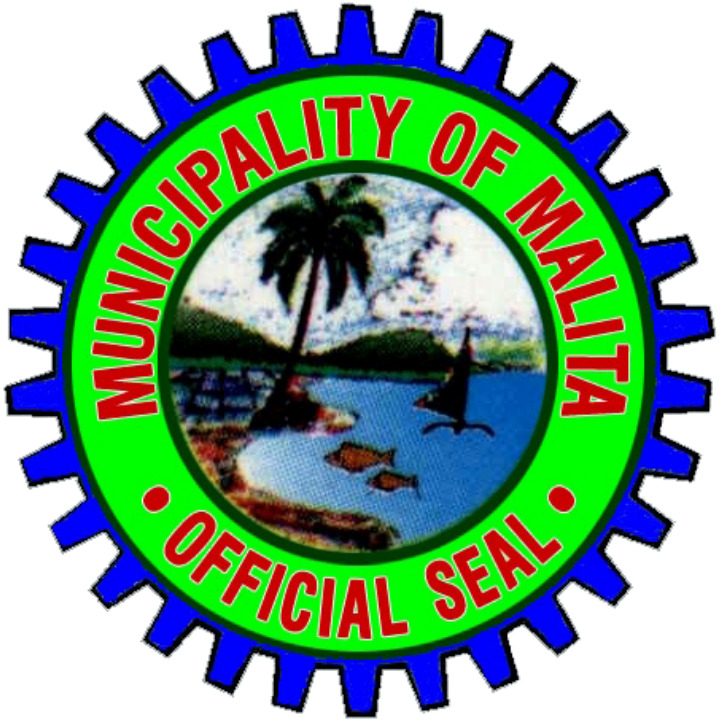
- Flag Seal
- Nicknames: Jewel of the South; Whaleshark Capital of Mindanao
- Motto: Angat Malita!
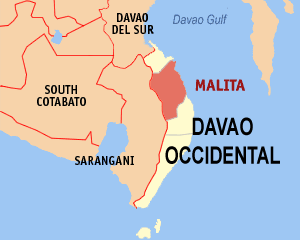
- Map of Davao Occidental with Malita highlighted
- Interactive map of Malita
- Location within the Philippines
- Coordinates: 6°24′39″N 125°36′52″E
- Country: Philippines
- Region: Davao Region
- Province: Davao Occidental
- District: Lone district
- Founded: November 17, 1936
- Barangays: 30 (see Barangays)

Government
  - Type: Sangguniang Bayan
  - Mayor: Bradly L. Bautista
  - Vice Mayor: Estefanie Bautista-Dumama
  - Representative: Lorna Bautista-Bandigan
  - Municipal Council: Members: Benjamin T. Bautista III; Carlo Chino G. Baliota; Elvira L. Gabaldon; Girly D. Licuan; Allan G. Colina; Isabelo M. Masiwel; Tomas D. Alcordo Jr.; Josie James D. Rillo
  - Electorate: 74,037 voters (2025)

Area
  - Total: 883.37 km^{2} (341.07 sq mi)
- Elevation: 197 m (646 ft)
- Highest elevation: 1,786 m (5,860 ft)
- Lowest elevation: 0 m (0 ft)

Population (2024 census)
  - Total: 118,438
  - Density: 134.08/km^{2} (347.25/sq mi)
  - Households: 29,489

Economy
  - Income class: 1st municipal income class
  - Poverty incidence: 23.05% (2023)
  - Revenue: ₱ 756.4 million (2024)
  - Assets: ₱ 1,933 million (2024)
  - Expenditure: ₱ 734 million (2024)
  - Liabilities: ₱ 665.4 million (2024)

Service provider
  - Electricity: Davao del Sur Electric Cooperative (DASURECO)
- Time zone: UTC+8 (PST)
- ZIP code: 8012
- PSGC: 1108603000
- IDD : area code: +63 (0)82
- Native languages: Davawenyo; Cebuano; Kalagan; Tagalog
- Website: www.malita.gov.ph

Malita, officially the Municipality of Malita (Cebuano: Lungsod sa Malita; Filipino: Bayan ng Malita), is a municipality and capital of the province of Davao Occidental, Philippines. According to the 2024 census, it has a population of 118,438 people making it the most populous town in the province.

Malita is known for various cultural arts and heritage of its people and tribes. Gaginaway Festival is celebrated annually every full moon on the month of November and Araw ng Malita is celebrated annually on November 17, the day of its establishment's enactment in 1936.

== Etymology ==
According to a legend, the name of Malita was derived from the Spanish word maleta, meaning suitcase. Don Mariano Peralta, a retired Spanish–American War veteran, lost his suitcase while crossing a river. His shouts of "Maleta, Maleta" caught the attention of the locals, who retrieved it and later named the area Malita. Its spelling may be associated with the local pronunciation, wherein the ‘e’ sound is commonly used for the vowels ‘i’ and ‘e’.

== History ==
Malita is the first municipality established in what is now Davao Occidental. However, its existence dates back scores of years before its formal creation as a municipality of the undivided province of Davao. The Tagakaulo, Blaan and Manobo communities have been living in the area before the arrival of the Spaniards. In 1887, Pablo Pastells, a Jesuit missionary, mentioned Malita, along with Malalag and Lais, as areas where a total of almost 7,000 Tagakaulos lived in.

Records show that Malita must have existed long before the passage of the Philippine Commission Act, the Laws of the Moro Province that mentioned Malita in Section 1 of Act No. 164 dated December 10, 1904. Through the said Act it is presumed that it existed as a barrio of Santa Cruz long before the coming of the Americans to Davao.

Waves of migrants from the Visayan islands, most of whom hail from Cebu, came on what is now Malita during the American colonial period. They were later followed by immigrants from Luzon. After World War II, the flow of migrants continued to other parts of then-Davao province and that included Malita.

In 1936, Malita was converted from a municipal district into a municipality after Executive Order No. 64, s. 1936 was issued by then-President Manuel L. Quezon. It originally consisted of nine barrios: Malita (the municipal seat), Basiauan, Kalian, Lacaron, Lais, Lawa, Lawayon, Talaguton, and Tubalon. Marcelino Maruya, for whom the town of Don Marcelino was named after, was the first appointed municipal mayor. The town parish, Our Lady of the Holy Rosary of Malita, was established in 1947.

Barrios Batulaki and Caburan were carved out from Malita to form the separate town of Trinidad (now Jose Abad Santos) on August 1, 1948. On May 8, 1967, Malita became part of Davao del Sur, when Davao was divided under Republic Act No. 4867. On December 19, 1979, barangays Calian, Kiobog, Lamidan, Lawa, Nueva Villa, and Talagutong were separated from Malita to form the new municipality of Don Marcelino.

The town high school was established in 1966. This school would eventually become the Southern Philippines Agri-Business and Marine and Aquatic School of Technology in 1984.

In 1978, the Davao del Sur Electric Cooperative expanded into Malita, becoming the power provider in the town.

On October 28, 2013, Malita was ceded to Davao Occidental and designated as its provincial capital as a result of a plebiscite, in which the majority of voters approved the creation of the new province.

In 2016, a 2000-hectare industrial plant built by San Miguel opened in the town.

== Geography ==
=== Climate ===
Climate data for Malita, Davao Occidental
| Month | Jan | Feb | Mar | Apr | May | Jun | Jul | Aug | Sep | Oct | Nov | Dec | Year |
|---|---|---|---|---|---|---|---|---|---|---|---|---|---|
| Mean daily maximum °C (°F) | 30 (86) | 30 (86) | 31 (88) | 32 (90) | 31 (88) | 29 (84) | 29 (84) | 30 (86) | 30 (86) | 30 (86) | 30 (86) | 30 (86) | 30 (86) |
| Mean daily minimum °C (°F) | 23 (73) | 23 (73) | 23 (73) | 24 (75) | 24 (75) | 24 (75) | 24 (75) | 24 (75) | 24 (75) | 24 (75) | 24 (75) | 23 (73) | 24 (74) |
| Average precipitation mm (inches) | 38 (1.5) | 29 (1.1) | 37 (1.5) | 45 (1.8) | 102 (4.0) | 166 (6.5) | 179 (7.0) | 176 (6.9) | 157 (6.2) | 133 (5.2) | 86 (3.4) | 46 (1.8) | 1,194 (46.9) |
| Average rainy days | 8.1 | 7.0 | 8.9 | 11.1 | 22.1 | 26.1 | 26.7 | 26.5 | 25.6 | 25.5 | 19.5 | 11.7 | 218.8 |
Source: Meteoblue

=== Barangays ===
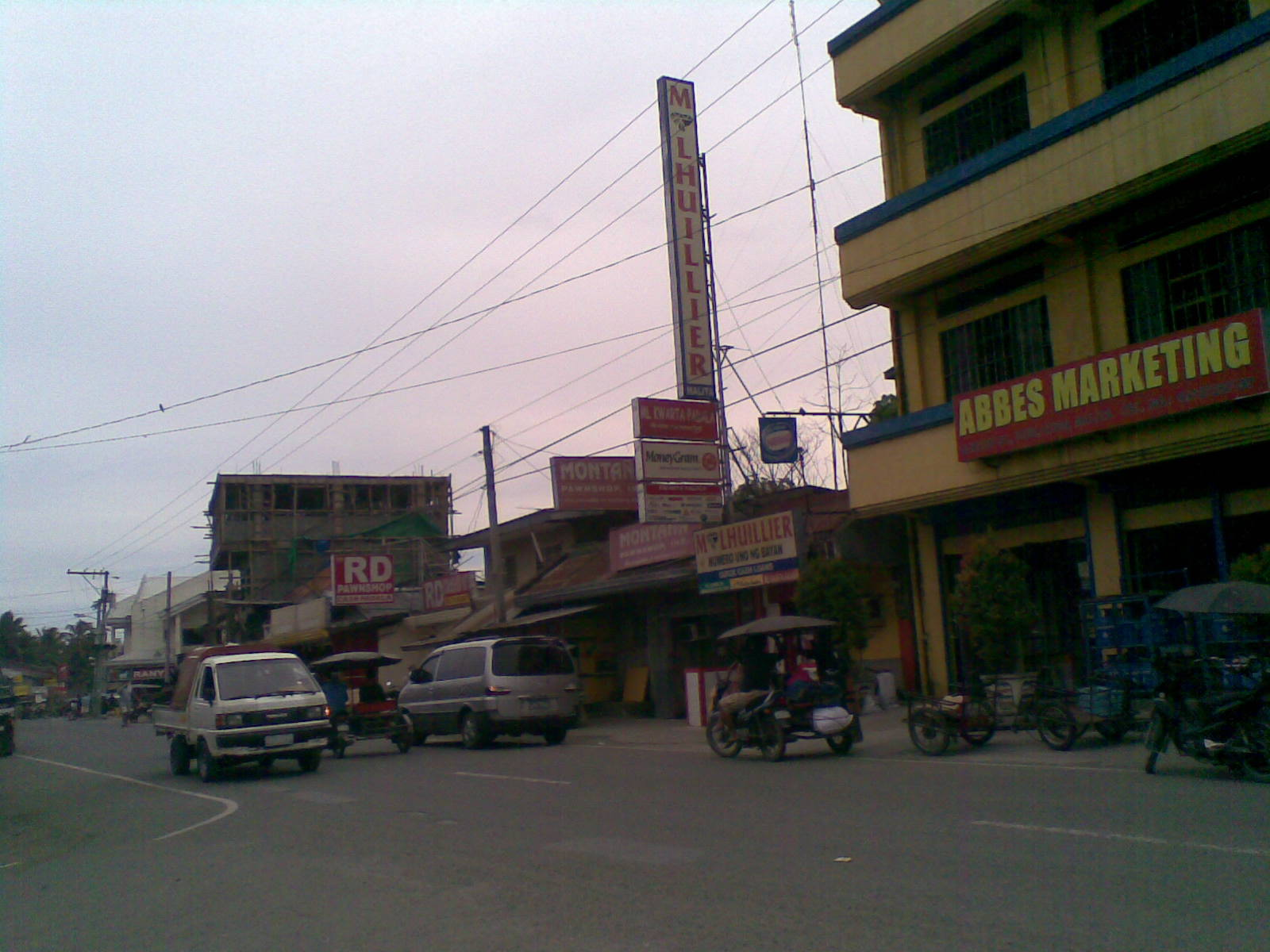
Quezon Street

Malita is subdivided into 30 barangays: Each barangay consists of puroks while some have sitios.

- Bito
- Bolila
- Buhangin
- Culaman
- Datu Danwata
- Demoloc
- Felis
- Fishing Village
- Kibalatong
- Kidalapong
- Kilalag
- Kinangan
- Lacaron
- Lagumit
- Lais
- Little Baguio
- Macol
- Mana
- Manuel Peralta
- New Argao
- Pangian
- Pinalpalan
- Poblacion
- Sangay
- Talogoy
- Tical
- Ticulon
- Tingolo
- Tubalan
- Pangaleon

== Demographics ==
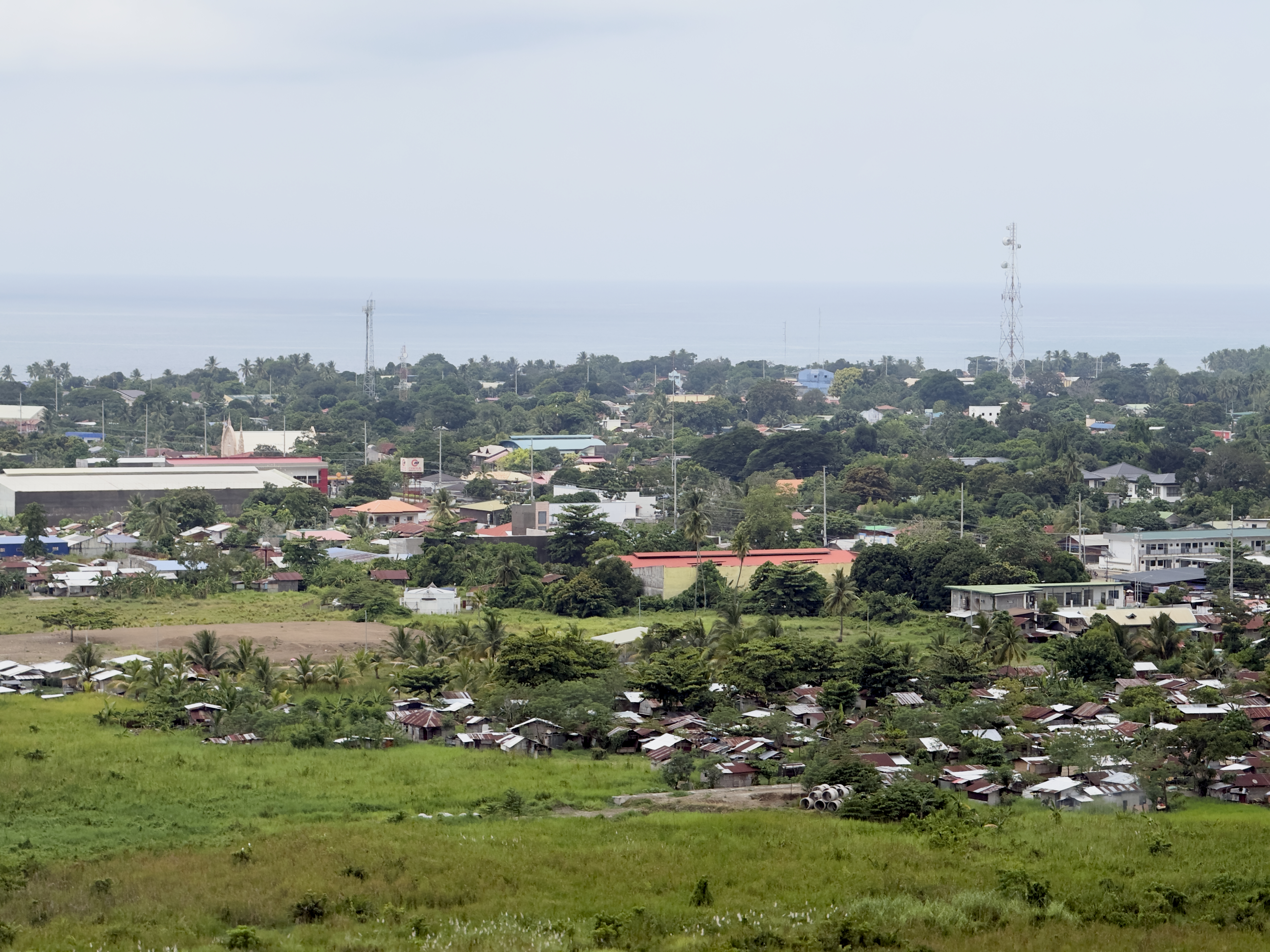
Skyline of Malita

Population census of Malita
| Year | Pop. | ±% p.a. |
|---|---|---|
| 1918 | 17,050 | — |
| 1939 | 30,775 | +2.85% |
| 1948 | 27,744 | −1.15% |
| 1960 | 28,228 | +0.14% |
| 1970 | 46,060 | +5.01% |
| 1975 | 64,898 | +7.12% |
| 1980 | 60,638 | −1.35% |
| 1990 | 82,786 | +3.16% |
| 1995 | 83,457 | +0.15% |
| 2000 | 100,000 | +3.95% |
| 2007 | 106,135 | +0.82% |
| 2010 | 109,568 | +1.17% |
| 2015 | 117,746 | +1.38% |
| 2020 | 118,197 | +0.08% |
| 2024 | 118,438 | +0.05% |
Source: Philippine Statistics Authority

== Economy ==
Poverty incidence of Malita (%)

Source: Philippine Statistics Authority

Malita is the main economic center of Davao Occidental. Agriculture and fishery are primary economic drivers of the municipality. There is also a fledgling tourism industry, focused on snorkeling and water activities. The energy sector also contributes to the municipality's economy. The Malita Power Plant, opened in 2018, is a 300-megawatt coal-fired thermal power plant developed by San Miguel Global Power.

As the town is quite far from other urban centers such as Digos, Davao City and General Santos, Malita is now developing as an urban center of its own, evident in its population, the biggest amongst the municipalities of Davao Occidental. It is now home to hospitals, colleges, banks and shopping centers. As economic activity in the town continues its rapid growth, Malita will soon become the province's first component city in a few years.

== Government ==
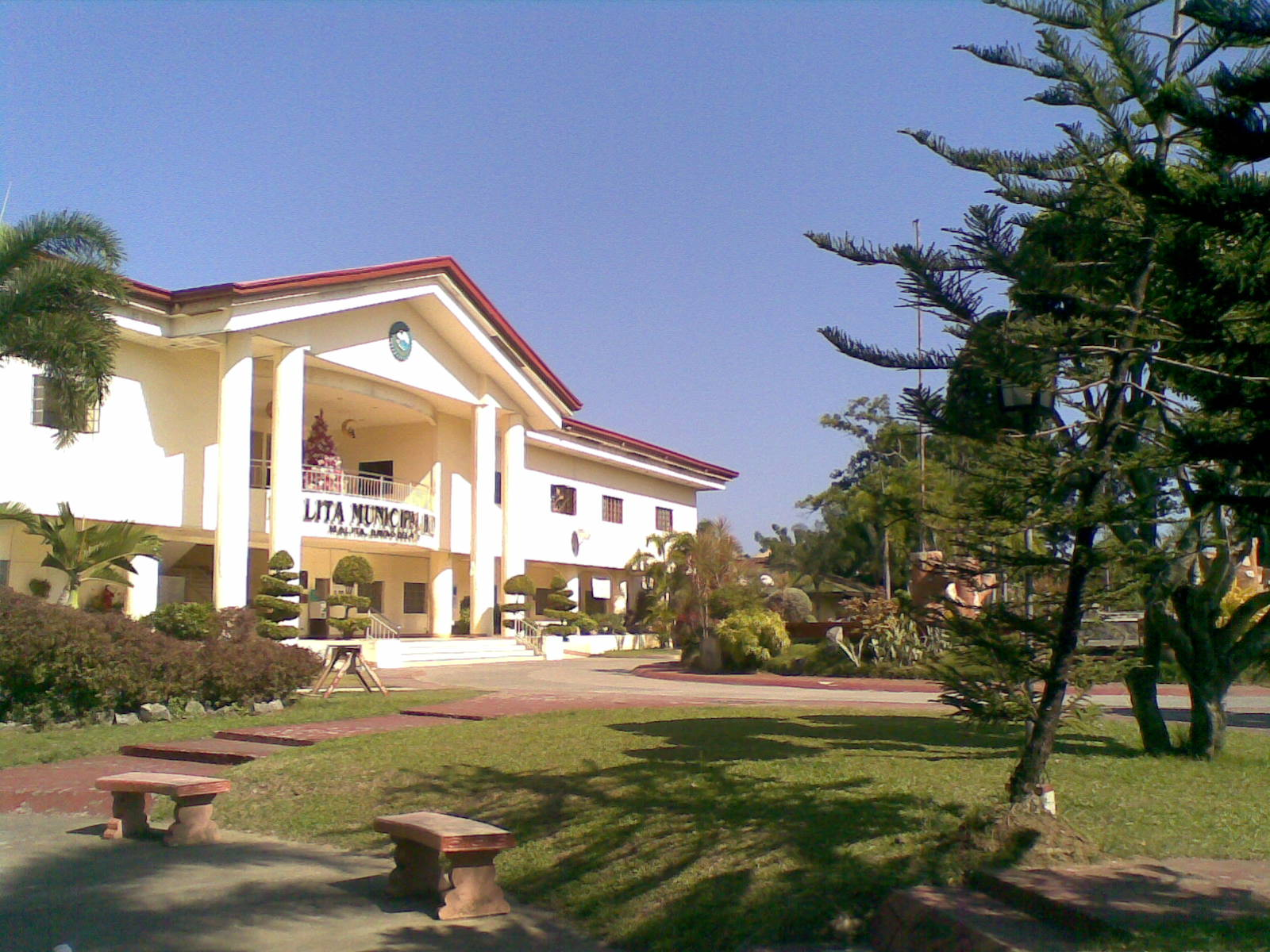
Malita Municipal Hall

Municipal officials (2022-2025):

- Mayor: Bradly Bautista
- Vice Mayor: Estefanie Bautista-Dumama
- Councilors:
  - Benjamin Bautista III
  - Carlo Chino Baliota
  - Romeo T. Lopez
  - Girly Licuan
  - Allan Colina
  - Isabelo Masiwel
  - Tomas Alcordo Jr.
  - Josie James Rillo

== Education ==
=== Tertiary ===
- Southern Philippines Agri-Business and Marine and Aquatic School of Technology - Poblacion, Malita (Main Campus) and Buhangin, Malita (Buhangin Campus)
- Adventure College of Malita, Inc.
- Seng Pek Chuan Academy, Inc.
- Don Juan Technical Academy of Davao, Inc. (Malita Branch)

=== Secondary ===
- B'laan National High School
- Benjamin V. Bautista Sr. Special High School
- Ernesto Lopez National High School
- Demoloc Valley National High School
- Fishing Village Comprehensive National High School
- Holy Cross of Malita, Inc.
- Mariano Peralta National High School (Campuses in barangays: Poblacion, Sangay, Manuel Peralta, Datu Danwata, Talogoy, Pangian, and New Argao)
- Ticulon National High School
- Tubalan Comprehensive National High School
