= 2025 Philippine House of Representatives elections in the Davao Region =

- May 12, 2025
- All 11 Davao Region seats in the House of Representatives
Party	Seats	+/–
Lakas	4	New
HTL	3	+3
PFP	1	New
Nacionalista	1	−1
NPC	1	New
Independent	1	+1
This lists parties that won seats. See the complete results below.

The 2025 Philippine House of Representatives elections in the Davao Region were held on May 12, 2025, as part of the 2025 Philippine general election.

== Summary ==
Congressional district	Incumbent	Incumbent's party	Winner	Winner's party	Winning margin
Davao City–1st	Paolo Duterte	HTL	Paolo Duterte	HTL	59.72%
Davao City–2nd	Vincent Garcia	Lakas	Omar Duterte	HTL	27.83%
Davao City–3rd	Isidro Ungab	HTL	Isidro Ungab	HTL	64.25%
Davao de Oro–1st	Maricar Zamora	Lakas	Maricar Zamora	Lakas	43.24%
Davao de Oro–2nd	Ruwel Peter Gonzaga	PFP	Jhong Ceniza	Independent	12.78%
Davao del Norte–1st	Pantaleon Alvarez	Reporma	Oyo Uy	Lakas	18.79%
Davao del Norte–2nd	Alan Dujali	Lakas	JM Lagdameo	PFP	31.05%
Davao del Sur	John Tracy Cagas	Nacionalista	John Tracy Cagas	Nacionalista	41.22%
Davao Occidental	Claude Bautista	NPC	Claude Bautista	NPC	Unopposed
Davao Oriental–1st	Nelson Dayanghirang Sr.	Nacionalista	Nelson Dayanghirang Jr.	Lakas	23.40%
Davao Oriental–2nd	Cheeno Almario	Lakas	Cheeno Almario	Lakas	21.86%

== Davao City ==
=== 1st district ===
2025 Davao City's 1st congressional district election
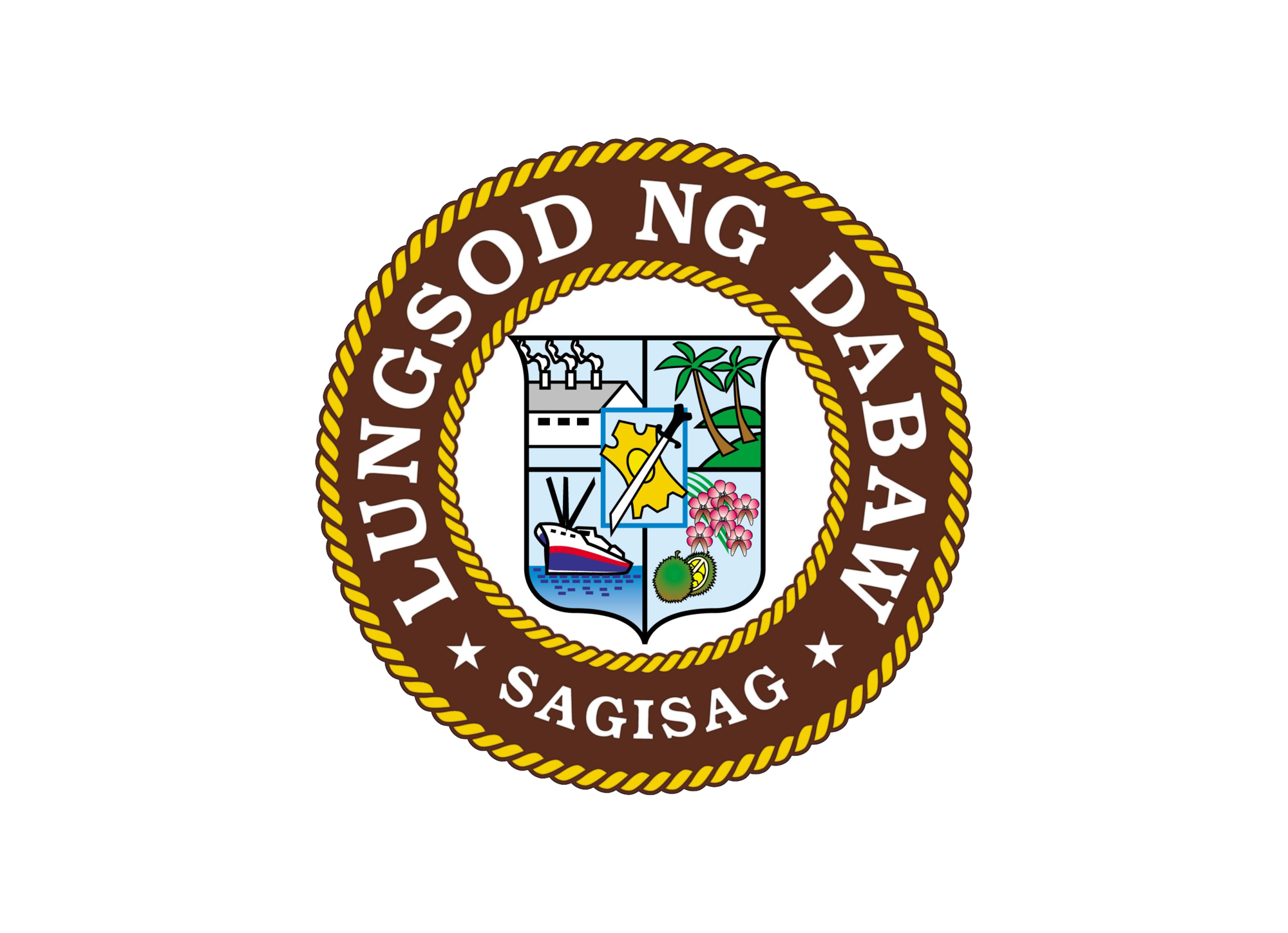

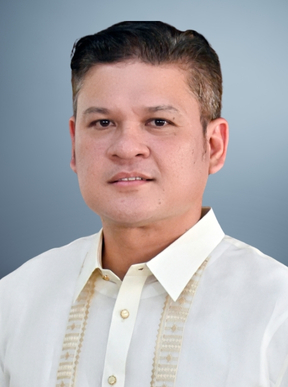

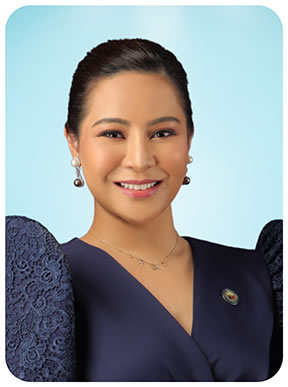
Candidate	Paolo Duterte	Migs Nograles
Party	Hugpong	Independent
Popular vote	203,557	49,186
Percentage	78.75%	19.03%
Representative before election
Paolo Duterte
Hugpong
Elected Representative
Paolo Duterte
Hugpong

Incumbent Paolo Duterte of Hugpong sa Tawong Lungsod ran for a third term. He was previously affiliated with Hugpong ng Pagbabago.

Duterte won re-election against PBA party-list representative Migs Nograles (Independent), Mags Maglana (Independent) and two other candidates.

Candidate	Party	Votes	%
Paolo Duterte (incumbent)	Hugpong sa Tawong Lungsod	203,557	78.75
Migs Nograles	Independent	49,186	19.03
Mags Maglana	Independent	3,530	1.37
Janeth Jabines	Independent	1,870	0.72
Rex Labis	Independent	331	0.13
Total		258,474	100.00
Valid votes		258,474	96.96
Invalid/blank votes		8,100	3.04
Total votes		266,574	100.00
Registered voters/turnout		366,439	72.75
HTL hold			
Source: Commission on Elections

=== 2nd district ===
2025 Davao City's 2nd congressional district election
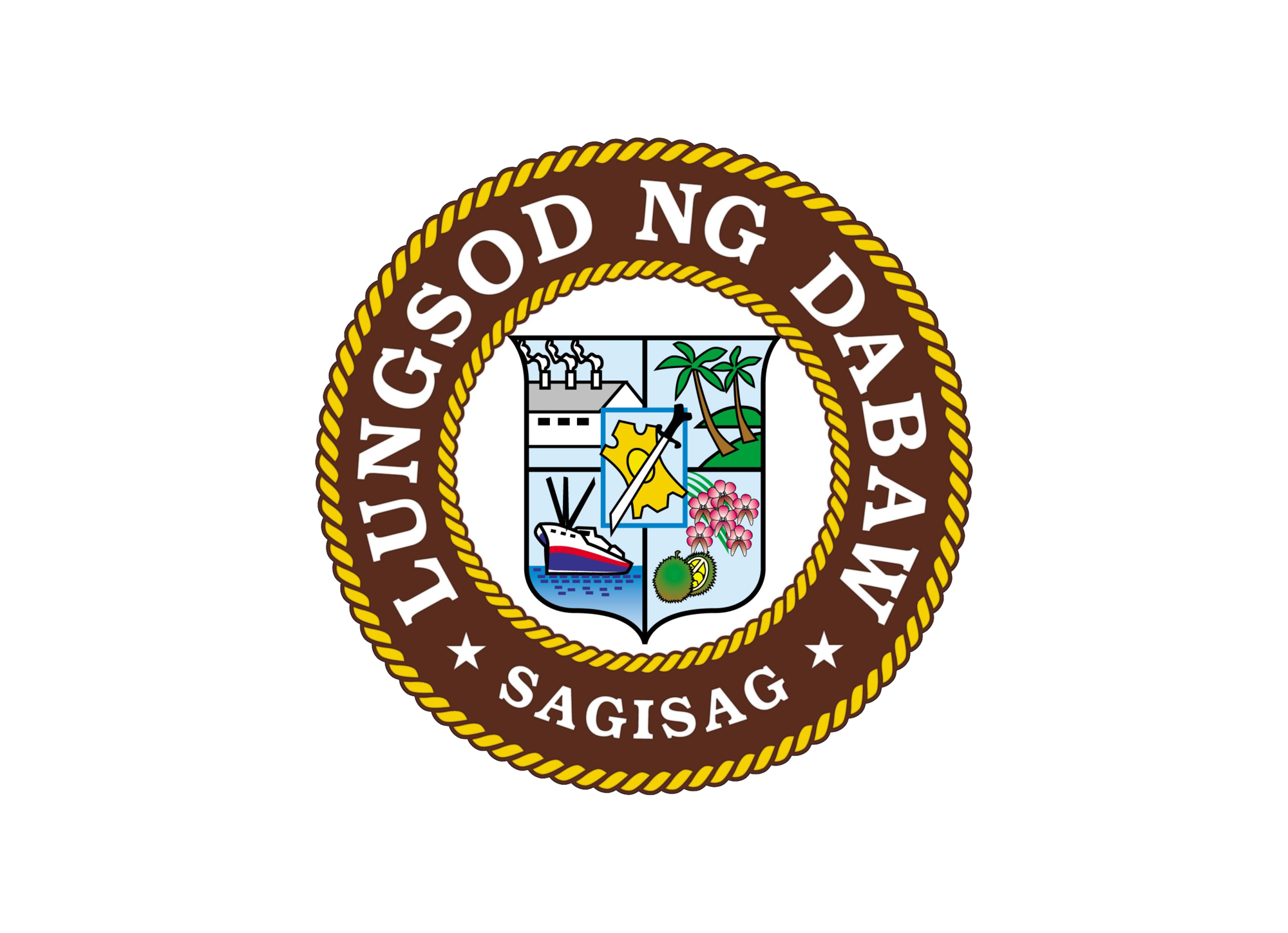

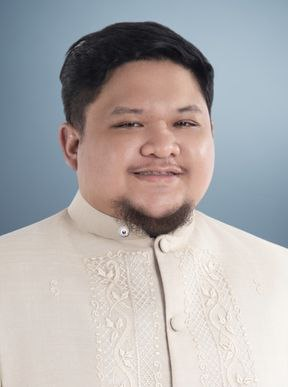
		PFP
Candidate	Omar Duterte	Javi Campos
Party	Hugpong	PFP
Popular vote	160,432	90,156
Percentage	63.54%	35.71%
Representative before election
Vincent Garcia
Lakas
Elected Representative
Omar Duterte
Hugpong

Incumbent Vincent Garcia of Lakas–CMD retired. He was previously affiliated with Hugpong ng Pagbabago.

Garcia endorsed his nephew, city councilor Javi Campos of the Partido Federal ng Pilipinas, who was defeated by Barangay Buhangin chairperson Omar Duterte of Hugpong sa Tawong Lungsod. Melogen Montesclaros (Independent) also ran for representative.

Candidate	Party	Votes	%
Omar Duterte	Hugpong sa Tawong Lungsod	160,432	63.54
Javi Campos	Partido Federal ng Pilipinas	90,156	35.71
Melogen Montesclaros	Independent	1,895	0.75
Total		252,483	100.00
Valid votes		252,483	96.61
Invalid/blank votes		8,867	3.39
Total votes		261,350	100.00
Registered voters/turnout		332,318	78.64
HTL gain from Lakas			
Source: Commission on Elections

=== 3rd district ===
2025 Davao City's 3rd congressional district election
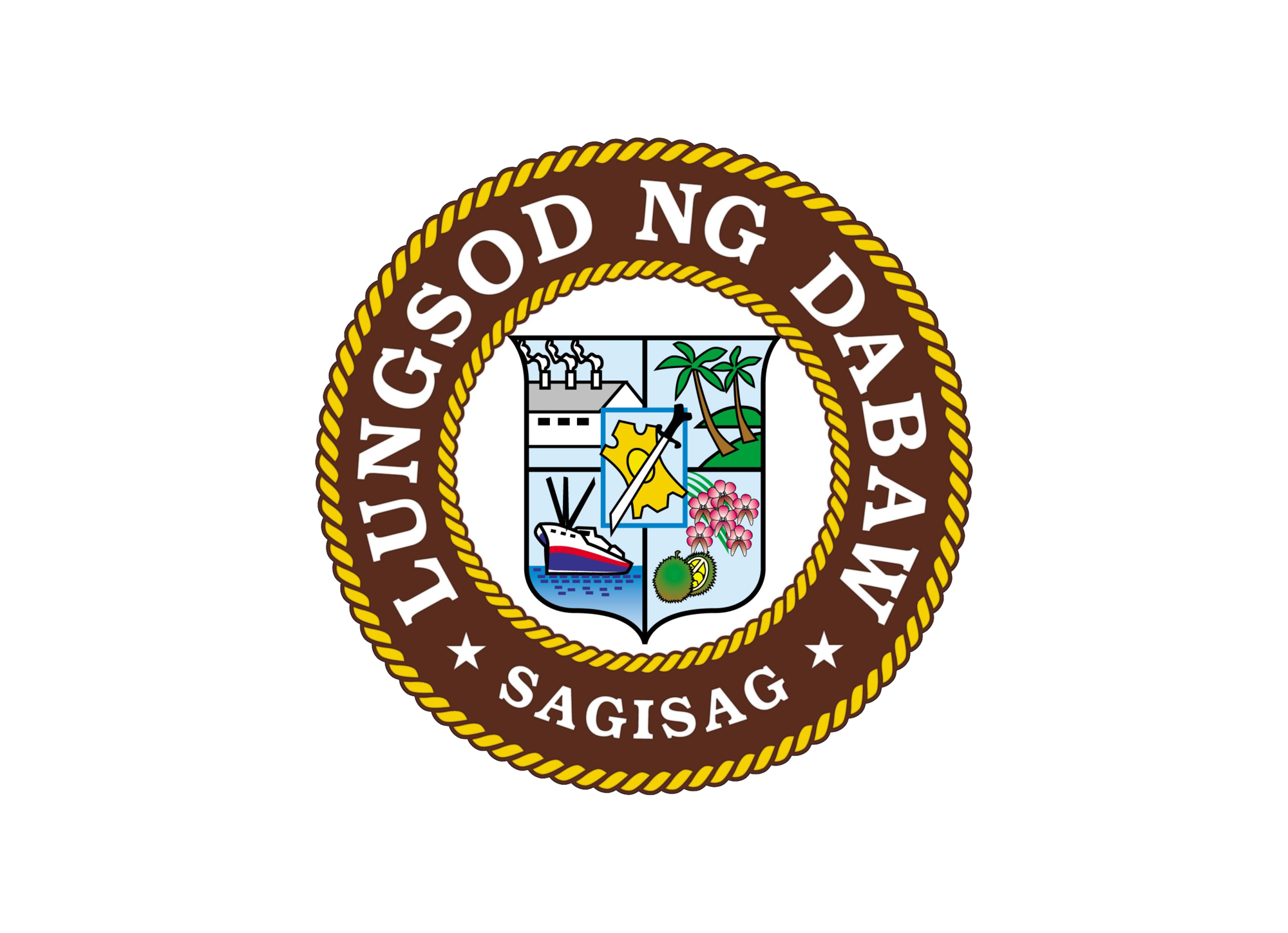

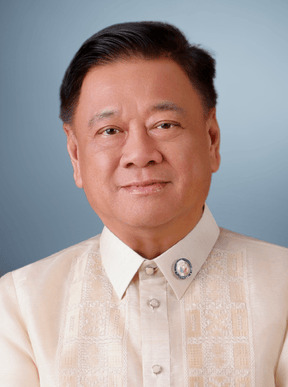
		Lakas
Candidate	Isidro Ungab	Nonoy Al-ag
Party	Hugpong	Lakas
Popular vote	178,721	30,687
Percentage	77.57%	13.32%
Representative before election
Isidro Ungab
Hugpong
Elected Representative
Isidro Ungab
Hugpong

Incumbent Isidro Ungab of Hugpong sa Tawong Lungsod ran for a third term. He was previously affiliated with Hugpong ng Pagbabago.

Ungab won re-election against city councilor Nonoy Al-ag (Lakas–CMD), former representative Ruy Elias Lopez (Partido Federal ng Pilipinas) and two other candidates.

Candidate	Party	Votes	%
Isidro Ungab (incumbent)	Hugpong sa Tawong Lungsod	178,721	77.57
Nonoy Al-ag	Lakas–CMD	30,687	13.32
Ruy Elias Lopez	Partido Federal ng Pilipinas	19,243	8.35
Lito Monreal	Independent	1,133	0.49
Dindo Plaza	Independent	612	0.27
Total		230,396	100.00
Valid votes		230,396	92.41
Invalid/blank votes		18,917	7.59
Total votes		249,313	100.00
Registered voters/turnout		307,835	80.99
HTL hold			
Source: Commission on Elections

== Davao de Oro ==
=== 1st district ===
Davao de Oro's 1st congressional district election
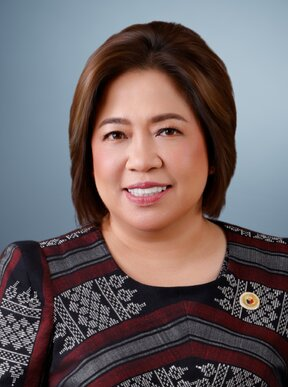
		IND
Candidate	Maricar Zamora	Franco Tito
Party	Lakas	Independent
Popular vote	134,782	47,988
Percentage	67.15%	23.91%
Representative before election
Maricar Zamora
Lakas
Elected Representative
Maricar Zamora
Lakas

Incumbent Maricar Zamora of Lakas–CMD ran for a second term. She was previously affiliated with Hugpong ng Pagbabago.

Zamora won re-election against two other candidates.

Candidate	Party	Votes	%
Maricar Zamora (incumbent)	Lakas–CMD	134,782	67.15
Franco Tito	Independent	47,988	23.91
Joselito Brillantes	Independent	17,938	8.94
Total		200,708	100.00
Valid votes		200,708	91.25
Invalid/blank votes		19,236	8.75
Total votes		219,944	100.00
Registered voters/turnout		245,824	89.47
Lakas hold			
Source: Commission on Elections

=== 2nd district ===
Davao de Oro's 2nd congressional district election
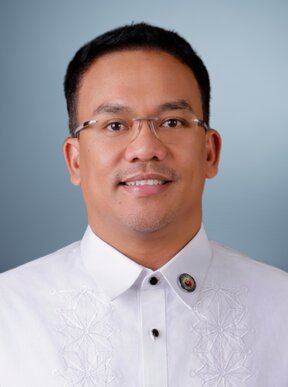
		IND
Candidate	Jhong Ceniza	Butchoy Taojo
Party	Independent	PFP
Popular vote	148,478	114,816
Percentage	56.39%	43.61%
Representative before election
Ruwel Peter Gonzaga
PFP
Elected Representative
Jhong Ceniza
Independent

Term-limited incumbent Ruwel Peter Gonzaga of the Partido Federal ng Pilipinas (PFP) ran for governor of Davao de Oro. He was previously affiliated with PDP–Laban.

The PFP nominated Butchoy Taojo, who was defeated by Pantukan mayor Jhong Ceniza, an independent.

Candidate	Party	Votes	%
Jhong Ceniza	Independent	148,478	56.39
Butchoy Taojo	Partido Federal ng Pilipinas	114,816	43.61
Total		263,294	100.00
Valid votes		263,294	97.27
Invalid/blank votes		7,391	2.73
Total votes		270,685	100.00
Registered voters/turnout		302,566	89.46
Independent gain from PFP			
Source: Commission on Elections

== Davao del Norte ==
=== 1st district ===
Davao del Norte's 1st congressional district election
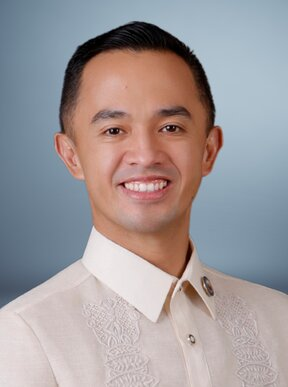
		PFP
Candidate	De Carlo Uy	Nickel Suaybaguio
Party	Lakas	PFP
Popular vote	147,057	97,519
Percentage	55.77%	36.98%
Representative before election
Pantaleon Alvarez
Reporma
Elected Representative
De Carlo Uy
Lakas

Term-limited incumbent Pantaleon Alvarez of the Partido para sa Demokratikong Reporma ran for vice governor of Davao del Norte.

Davao del Norte vice governor De Carlo Uy (Lakas–CMD) won the election against provincial board member Nickel Suaybaguio (Partido Federal ng Pilipinas) and three other candidates.

Candidate	Party	Votes	%
De Carlo Uy	Lakas–CMD	147,057	55.77
Nickel Suaybaguio	Partido Federal ng Pilipinas	97,519	36.98
Cesar Cuntapay	PDP–Laban	14,210	5.39
Edwin Concon	Independent	3,655	1.39
Cesar Granada	Independent	1,241	0.47
Total		263,682	100.00
Valid votes		263,682	90.86
Invalid/blank votes		26,529	9.14
Total votes		290,211	100.00
Registered voters/turnout		347,453	83.53
Lakas gain from Reporma			
Source: Commission on Elections

=== 2nd district ===
Davao del Norte's 2nd congressional district election
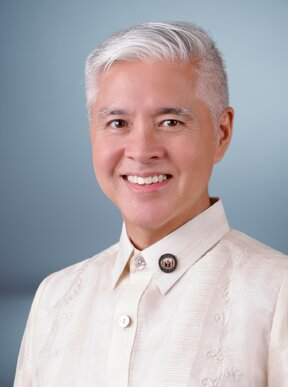
		IND
Candidate	Jose Manuel Lagdameo	Rico Peligro
Party	PFP	Independent
Popular vote	154,306	71,554
Percentage	57.90%	26.85%
Representative before election
Alan Dujali
Lakas
Elected Representative
Jose Manuel Lagdameo
PFP

Incumbent Alan Dujali of Lakas–CMD retired to run for governor of Davao del Norte. He was previously affiliated with Hugpong ng Pagbabago.

Dujali endorsed Jose Manuel Lagdameo (Partido Federal ng Pilipinas), who won the election against three other candidates.

Candidate	Party	Votes	%
Jose Manuel Lagdameo	Partido Federal ng Pilipinas	154,306	57.90
Rico Peligro	Independent	71,554	26.85
Ana Teresa Dujali	Independent	37,959	14.24
Randy Santa Maria	Independent	2,707	1.02
Total		266,526	100.00
Valid votes		266,526	85.39
Invalid/blank votes		45,588	14.61
Total votes		312,114	100.00
Registered voters/turnout		369,996	84.36
PFP gain from Lakas			
Source: Commission on Elections

== Davao del Sur ==
Davao del Sur's lone congressional district election
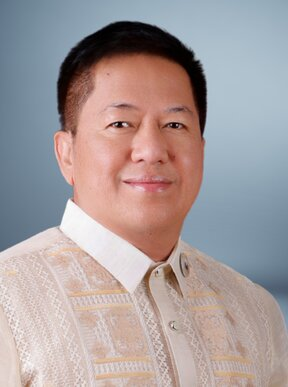
		IND
Candidate	John Tracy Cagas	Arvin Malaza
Party	Nacionalista	Independent
Popular vote	193,123	80,389
Percentage	70.61%	29.39%
Representative before election
John Tracy Cagas
Nacionalista
Elected Representative
John Tracy Cagas
Nacionalista

Incumbent John Tracy Cagas of the Nacionalista Party ran for a second term.

Cagas won re-election against former provincial board member Arvin Malaza (Independent).

Candidate	Party	Votes	%
John Tracy Cagas (incumbent)	Nacionalista Party	193,123	70.61
Arvin Malaza	Independent	80,389	29.39
Total		273,512	100.00
Valid votes		273,512	71.76
Invalid/blank votes		107,627	28.24
Total votes		381,139	100.00
Registered voters/turnout		465,227	81.93
Nacionalista hold			
Source: Commission on Elections

== Davao Occidental ==
2025 Davao Occidental's lone congressional district election
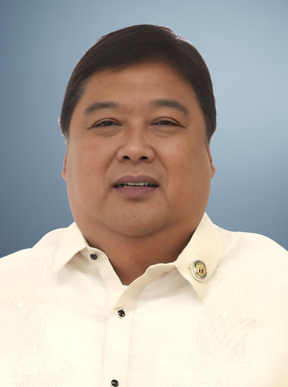
Candidate	Claude Bautista
Party	NPC
Popular vote	112,722
Percentage	100.00%
Representative before election
Claude Bautista
NPC
Elected Representative
Claude Bautista
NPC

Incumbent Claude Bautista of the Nationalist People's Coalition won re-election for a second term unopposed. He was previously affiliated with Hugpong ng Pagbabago.

Candidate	Party	Votes	%
Claude Bautista (incumbent)	Nationalist People's Coalition	112,722	100.00
Total		112,722	100.00
Valid votes		112,722	74.46
Invalid/blank votes		38,654	25.54
Total votes		151,376	100.00
Registered voters/turnout		205,167	73.78
NPC hold			
Source: Commission on Elections

== Davao Oriental ==
=== 1st district ===
Davao Oriental's 1st congressional district election
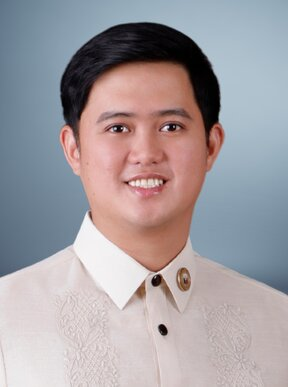
		PFP
Candidate	Nelson Dayanghirang Jr.	Pepot Lara
Party	Lakas	PFP
Popular vote	89,269	55,424
Percentage	61.70%	38.30%
Representative before election
Nelson Dayanghirang Sr.
Nacionalista
Elected Representative
Nelson Dayanghirang Jr.
Lakas

Incumbent Nelson Dayanghirang Sr. of the Nacionalista Party retired to run for governor of Davao Oriental.

Dayanghirang endorsed his son, Davao Oriental vice governor Nelson Dayanghirang Jr. (Lakas–CMD), who won the election against Baganga mayor Pepot Lara (Partido Federal ng Pilipinas).

Candidate	Party	Votes	%
Nelson Dayanghirang Jr.	Lakas–CMD	89,269	61.70
Pepot Lara	Partido Federal ng Pilipinas	55,424	38.30
Total		144,693	100.00
Valid votes		144,693	94.88
Invalid/blank votes		7,807	5.12
Total votes		152,500	100.00
Registered voters/turnout		174,878	87.20
Lakas gain from Nacionalista			
Source: Commission on Elections

=== 2nd district ===
Davao Oriental's 2nd congressional district election
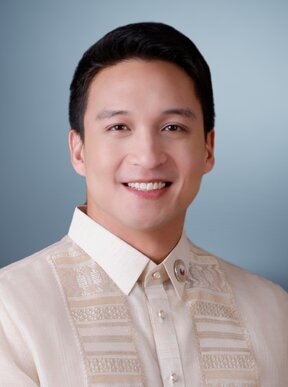
		PFP
Candidate	Cheeno Almario	Sito Rabat
Party	Lakas	PFP
Popular vote	128,454	82,358
Percentage	60.93%	39.07%
Representative before election
Cheeno Almario
Lakas
Elected Representative
Cheeno Almario
Lakas

Incumbent Cheeno Almario of Lakas–CMD ran for a second term. He was previously affiliated with PDP–Laban.

Almario won re-election against Sito Rabat (Partido Federal ng Pilipinas).

Candidate	Party	Votes	%
Cheeno Almario (incumbent)	Lakas–CMD	128,454	60.93
Sito Rabat	Partido Federal ng Pilipinas	82,358	39.07
Total		210,812	100.00
Valid votes		210,812	94.15
Invalid/blank votes		13,107	5.85
Total votes		223,919	100.00
Registered voters/turnout		258,767	86.53
Lakas hold			
Source: Commission on Elections
