= 2022 Philippine House of Representatives elections in the Davao Region =

- May 9, 2022
- All 11 Davao Region seats in the House of Representatives
Party	Seats	+/–
HNP	6	+3
Nacionalista	2	0
PDP–Laban	2	−2
Reporma	1	New
This lists parties that won seats. See the complete results below.

The 2022 Philippine House of Representatives elections in the Davao Region were held on May 9, 2022.

== Summary ==
Congressional district	Incumbent	Incumbent's party	Winner	Winner's party	Winning margin
Davao City–1st	Paolo Duterte	HNP	Paolo Duterte	HNP	86.75%
Davao City–2nd	Vincent Garcia	HNP	Vincent Garcia	HNP	36.42%
Davao City–3rd	Isidro Ungab	HNP	Isidro Ungab	HNP	95.62%
Davao de Oro–1st	Manuel E. Zamora	HNP	Maricar Zamora	HNP	11.31%
Davao de Oro–2nd	Ruwel Peter Gonzaga	PDP–Laban	Ruwel Peter Gonzaga	PDP–Laban	20.82%
Davao del Norte–1st	Pantaleon Alvarez	Reporma	Pantaleon Alvarez	Reporma	14.23%
Davao del Norte–2nd	Alan Dujali	HNP	Alan Dujali	HNP	25.98%
Davao del Sur	Mercedes Cagas	Nacionalista	John Tracy Cagas	Nacionalista	40.87%
Davao Occidental	Lorna Bautista-Bandigan	Lakas	Claude Bautista	HNP	Unopposed
Davao Oriental–1st	Corazon Malanyaon	Nacionalista	Nelson Dayanghirang Sr.	Nacionalista	Unopposed
Davao Oriental–2nd	Joel Mayo Almario	PDP–Laban	Cheeno Almario	PDP–Laban	16.86%

== Davao City ==
=== 1st district ===
Incumbent Paolo Duterte of Hugpong ng Pagbabago ran for a second term. He was previously affiliated with Hugpong sa Tawong Lungsod.

Duterte won re-election against Mags Maglana (Independent) and two other candidates.

Candidate	Party	Votes	%
Paolo Duterte (incumbent)	Hugpong ng Pagbabago	224,008	92.94
Mags Maglana	Independent	14,914	6.19
Jamal Kanan	Independent	1,432	0.59
Jovanie Mantawel	Independent	683	0.28
Total		241,037	100.00
Total votes		259,451	–
Registered voters/turnout		355,052	73.07
HNP hold			
Source: Commission on Elections

=== 2nd district ===
Incumbent Vincent Garcia of Hugpong ng Pagbabago ran for a second term.

Garcia won re-election against city councilor Danny Dayanghirang (Hugpong sa Tawong Lungsod) and Alberto Dulong (Independent).

Candidate	Party	Votes	%
Vincent Garcia (incumbent)	Hugpong ng Pagbabago	159,702	67.70
Danny Dayanghirang	Hugpong sa Tawong Lungsod	73,796	31.28
Alberto Dulong	Independent	2,415	1.02
Total		235,913	100.00
Total votes		257,891	–
Registered voters/turnout		354,747	72.70
Source: Commission on Elections

=== 3rd district ===
Incumbent Isidro Ungab of Hugpong ng Pagbabago ran for a second term.

Ungab won re-election against Abundio Indonilla (Independent).

Candidate	Party	Votes	%
Isidro Ungab (incumbent)	Hugpong ng Pagbabago	180,286	97.81
Abundio Indonilla	Independent	4,043	2.19
Total		184,329	100.00
Total votes		220,029	–
Registered voters/turnout		282,739	77.82
Source: Commission on Elections

== Davao de Oro ==
=== 1st district ===
Incumbent Manuel E. Zamora of Hugpong ng Pagbabago (HNP) retired to run for mayor of Monkayo.

The HNP nominated Zamora's daughter, former representative Maricar Zamora, who won against Monkayo mayor Joanna Gentugaya (PDP–Laban) and Nenz Atamosa (Independent).

Candidate	Party	Votes	%
Maricar Zamora	Hugpong ng Pagbabago	104,779	54.14
Joanna Gentugaya	PDP–Laban	82,898	42.83
Nenz Atamosa	Independent	5,863	3.03
Total		193,540	100.00
Total votes		205,007	–
Registered voters/turnout		233,351	87.85
HNP hold			
Source: Commission on Elections

=== 2nd district ===
Incumbent Ruwel Peter Gonzaga of PDP–Laban ran for a second term.

Gonzaga won re-election against former Davao de Oro governor Jose Caballero (Hugpong ng Pagbabago).

Candidate	Party	Votes	%
Ruwel Peter Gonzaga	PDP–Laban	136,379	60.41
Jose Caballero	Hugpong ng Pagbabago	89,388	39.59
Total		225,767	100.00
Total votes		241,519	–
Registered voters/turnout		274,870	87.87
PDP–Laban hold			
Source: Commission on Elections

== Davao del Norte ==
=== 1st district ===
Incumbent Pantaleon Alvarez of Partido para sa Demokratikong Reporma ran for a third term. He was previously affiliated with PDP–Laban.

Alvarez won re-election against two other candidates.

Candidate	Party	Votes	%
Pantaleon Alvarez (incumbent)	Partido para sa Demokratikong Reporma	143,057	56.69
Bong Aala	Hugpong ng Pagbabago	107,156	42.46
Caloy Rofales	Independent	2,133	0.85
Total		252,346	100.00
Total votes		281,364	–
Registered voters/turnout		337,583	83.35
Reporma hold			
Source: Commission on Elections

=== 2nd district ===
Incumbent Alan Dujali of Hugpong ng Pagbabago ran for a second term. He was previously affiliated with PDP–Laban.

Dujali won re-election against provincial board member Janris Jay Relampagos (Partido para sa Demokratikong Reporma).

Candidate	Party	Votes	%
Alan Dujali (incumbent)	Hugpong ng Pagbabago	166,750	62.99
Janris Jay Relampagos	Partido para sa Demokratikong Reporma	97,987	37.01
Total		264,737	100.00
Total votes		296,417	–
Registered voters/turnout		352,665	84.05
HNP hold			
Source: Commission on Elections

== Davao del Sur ==
Incumbent Mercedes Cagas of the Nacionalista Party was term-limited.

The Nacionalista Party nominated Cagas' nephew, Davao del Sur vice governor John Tracy Cagas, who won against provincial board member Erwin Llanos (Hugpong ng Pagbabago) and two other candidates.

Candidate	Party	Votes	%
John Tracy Cagas	Nacionalista Party	214,741	67.70
Erwin Llanos	Hugpong ng Pagbabago	85,109	26.83
Mina King Almendras	Independent	13,927	4.39
Brando Agbon	Independent	3,406	1.07
Total		317,183	100.00
Total votes		377,546	–
Registered voters/turnout		457,073	82.60
Nacionalista hold			
Source: Commission on Elections

== Davao Occidental ==
Incumbent Lorna Bautista-Bandigan of Lakas–CMD retired to run for vice governor of Davao Occidental. She was previously affiliated with the Nationalist People's Coalition.

Bautista-Bandigan endorsed her brother, Davao Occidental governor Claude Bautista (Hugpong ng Pagbabago), who won the election unopposed.

Candidate	Party	Votes	%
Claude Bautista	Hugpong ng Pagbabago	106,637	100.00
Total		106,637	100.00
Total votes		148,753	–
Registered voters/turnout		192,420	77.31
HNP gain from Lakas			
Source: Commission on Elections

== Davao Oriental ==
=== 1st District ===
Incumbent Corazon Malanyaon of the Nacionalista Party retired to run for governor of Davao Oriental.

The Nacionalista Party nominated Davao Oriental governor Nelson Dayanghirang Sr., who won the election unopposed.

Candidate	Party	Votes	%
Nelson Dayanghirang Sr.	Nacionalista Party	95,035	100.00
Total		95,035	100.00
Total votes		132,957	–
Registered voters/turnout		154,514	86.05
Nacionalista hold			
Source: Commission on Elections

=== 2nd district ===
Incumbent Joel Mayo Almario of PDP–Laban retired to run for mayor of Mati.

PDP–Laban nominated Almario's son, Mati councilor Cheeno Almario, who won the election against provincial board member Louie Rabat (Nacionalista Party).

Candidate	Party	Votes	%
Cheeno Almario	PDP–Laban	110,892	58.43
Louie Rabat	Nacionalista Party	78,905	41.57
Total		189,797	100.00
Total votes		208,063	–
Registered voters/turnout		241,237	86.25
PDP–Laban hold			
Source: Commission on Elections
