= Retiring and term-limited incumbents in the 2025 Philippine House of Representatives elections =

These are term-limited and retiring members of the House of Representatives of the Philippines during the 19th Congress of the Philippines, who either cannot or chose not to run in the 2025 House elections.

In the Philippines, members of the House of Representatives are limited to three consecutive terms. Term-limited members, therefore, cannot run in the 2025 elections, but may choose to run in other positions.

== Summary ==
There are 317 seats up for election from the 19th Congress, with 254 from congressional districts and 63 from party-list seats.

== Term-limited members ==
These members of Congress are term-limited and cannot run for reelection.

=== Lakas incumbents ===
1. Geraldine Roman (Bataan–1st)
  Roman's brother, Tony Roman, incumbent member of the Bataan Provincial Board, is running to succeed her.
2. Joey Salceda (Albay–2nd)
  Salceda is running for governor of Albay. He has endorsed second-term Ako Bicol representative Elizaldy Co to succeed him.
3. Marlyn Alonte-Naguiat (Biñan at-large)
  Alonte-Naguiat has endorsed Arman Dimaguila, incumbent mayor of Biñan to succeed her.
4. Mohamad Khalid Dimaporo (Lanao del Norte–1st)
  Dimaporo is running for governor of Lanao del Norte. His mother, Imelda Dimaporo, the incumbent governor, is running to succeed him.
5. Carmelo Lazatin II (Pampanga–1st)
  Lazatin is running for mayor of Angeles City. He has endorsed his brother, Carmelo Lazatin Jr., incumbent mayor, to succeed him.
6. Aurelio Gonzales Jr. (Pampanga–3rd)
  Gonzales was expected to run for mayor of San Fernando. He has endorsed his daughter, Mica Gonzales, incumbent member of the Pampanga Provincial Board, to succeed him.
7. Christopher de Venecia (Pangasinan–4th)
  De Venecia's mother, former representative Gina de Venecia, is running to succeed him.
8. Francisco Jose Matugas II (Surigao del Norte–1st)
  Matugas is running for governor of Surigao del Norte. His father, former representative Francisco Matugas, is running to succeed him.
9. Manuel Jose Dalipe (Zamboanga City–2nd)
  Dalipe is running for mayor of Zamboanga City. His brother, John Dalipe, the current mayor, is running to succeed him.
10. Glona Labadlabad (Zamboanga del Norte–2nd)
  Labadlabad is running for mayor of Sindangan. Her daughter, Irene Labadlabad, is running to succeed her.
11. Divina Grace Yu (Zamboanga del Sur–1st)
  Yu is running for governor of Zamboanga del Sur. She has endorsed her son, Joseph Yu, to succeed her.

=== Liberal incumbents ===
1. Gabriel Bordado (Camarines Sur–3rd)
  Bordado is running for vice mayor of Naga City with his running mate former vice president Leni Robredo. He has endorsed Nelson Legacion, the incumbent mayor, to succeed him.
2. Emmanuel Billones (Capiz–1st)
  Billones has endorsed Paolo Roxas to succeed him.

=== Nacionalista incumbents ===
1. Marquez Go (Baguio at-large)
  Go is running for mayor of Baguio. His wife, Soledad Go, is running to succeed him.
2. Lianda Bolilia (Batangas–4th)
  Bolilia's husband, Caloy Bolilia, is running to succeed her.
3. Mario Vittorio Mariño (Batangas–5th)
  Mariño is running for mayor of Batangas City. His wife, Beverly Dimacuha, incumbent mayor, is running to succeed him.
4. Raul Tupas (Iloilo–5th)
  Tupas is running for vice governor of Iloilo. His wife, Binky Tupas, incumbent member of the Iloilo Provincial Board, is running to succeed him.
5. Allen Jesse Mangaoang (Kalinga at-large)
  Mangaoang's wife, Caroline Agyao-Mangaoang, is running to succeed him.
6. Ace Barbers (Surigao del Norte–2nd)
  Barbers has endorsed his wife, Bernadette Barbers, to succeed him.

=== NPC incumbents ===
1. Jocelyn Sy-Limkaichong (Negros Oriental–1st)
  Sy-Limkaichong is running for mayor of Guihulngan. She has endorsed Emmanuel Limkaichong Iway, incumbent mayor of La Libertad, to succeed her.
2. Carlito Marquez (Aklan–1st)
  Marquez will retire from public office. His son, Jess Marquez, is running to succeed him.
3. Greg Gasataya (Bacolod at-large)
  Gasataya is running for mayor of Bacolod. He has endorsed Albee Benitez, the incumbent mayor, to succeed him.
4. Maria Theresa Collantes (Batangas–3rd)
  Collantes's son, King Collantes, is running to succeed her.
5. Peter John Calderon (Cebu–7th)
  Calderon's wife, Dr. Patricia Calderon, is running to succeed him.
6. Luis Campos Jr. (Makati–2nd)
  Campos is running for mayor of Makati. He has endorsed Alden Almario, incumbent member of the Makati City Council, to succeed him.
7. Edward Maceda (Manila–4th)
  Maceda's wife, Giselle Mary Maceda, is running to succeed him.
8. Lord Allan Velasco (Marinduque at-large)
  Velasco will run for governor of Marinduque switching places with his father, incumbent governor Presbitero Velasco Jr.
9. Chiquiting Sagarbarria (Negros Oriental–2nd)
  Sagarbarria is running for mayor of Dumaguete. His wife, Maisa Sagarbarria, the incumbent vice mayor, is running to succeed him.
10. Michael John Duavit (Rizal–1st)

=== NUP incumbents ===
1. Roberto Puno (Antipolo–1st)
2. Lorna Silverio (Bulacan–3rd)
  Silverio will retire from public office. Her son, Victor Silverio, is running to succeed her.
3. Luis Raymund Villafuerte (Camarines Sur–2nd)
  Villafuerte is running for governor of Camarines Sur. His son, Luigi Villafuerte, the incumbent governor, is running to succeed him.
4. Lucille Nava (Guimaras–at-large)
  Nava is running for governor of Guimaras. Her husband, JC Rahman Nava, the incumbent governor, is running to succeed her.
5. Neptali Gonzales II (Mandaluyong at-large)
  Gonzales' wife, Queenie Gonzales, is running to succeed him.
6. Juliet Ferrer (Negros Occidental–4th)
  Ferrer's husband, Jeffrey Ferrer, incumbent vice governor of Negros Occidental, is running to succeed her.
7. Horacio Suansing Jr. (Sultan Kudarat–2nd)
  His daughter, Bella Suansing, is running to succeed him.
8. Johnny Pimentel (Surigao del Sur-2nd)
  Pimentel is running for governor of Surigao del Sur. His brother, Alexander Pimentel, the incumbent governor, is running to succeed him.

=== PFP incumbents ===
1. Rosanna Vergara (Nueva Ecija–3rd)
  Vergara's husband, Julius Cesar Vergara, incumbent vice mayor of Cabanatuan, is running to succeed her.
2. Florida Robes (San Jose del Monte at-large)
  Robes is running for mayor of San Jose del Monte. Her husband, Arthur Robes, the incumbent mayor, is running to succeed her.
3. Ruwel Peter Gonzaga (Davao de Oro–2nd)
  Gonzaga will run for governor of Davao de Oro. He has endorsed Noe Taojo to succeed him.

=== Reporma incumbents ===
1. Pantaleon Alvarez (Davao del Norte–1st)
  Alvarez is running for vice governor of Davao del Norte.

=== UNA incumbents ===
1. Luisa Cuaresma (Nueva Vizcaya–at-large)
  Cuaresma is running for governor of Nueva Vizcaya.

=== Independent incumbents ===
1. Eric Martinez (Valenzuela–2nd)
  Martinez will run for senator. His wife, Katherine Martinez, is running to succeed him.

=== Party-list incumbents ===
1. Robert Raymond Estrella (Abono)
2. France Castro (ACT Teachers)
  Castro announced her bid for the Senate on June 26, 2024, under Makabayan. Former partylist representative Antonio Tinio will succeed her.
3. Anna Villaraza-Suarez (ALONA)
4. Bernadette Herrera (BH)
5. Arlene Brosas (Gabriela)
  Brosas announced her bid for the Senate on July 16, 2024, under Makabayan.
6. Shernee Tan Tambut (Kusug Tausug)
7. Virgilio Lacson (Manila Teachers)
8. Rodante Marcoleta (SAGIP)
  Marcoleta is running for senator as an independent.
9. Raymond Mendoza (TUCP)
  Mendoza will retire from politics.
10. Mikee Romero (1-Pacman)
  His daughter Milka Romero is one of 1-Pacman's nominees.

== Retiring members ==
The following members of Congress are eligible for another term, but have chosen to retire or seek other positions.

=== Basilan Unity Party ===
1. Mujiv Hataman (Basilan–at-large)
  Hataman will run for Governor of Basilan. Longtime ally Hanie Bud, mayor of Maluso, is running to succeed him.

=== Lakas incumbents ===
1. Ambrosio Cruz Jr. (Bulacan–5th)
  Cruz will run for mayor of Guiguinto, His daughter, Agay will run in his place.
2. Ramon Nolasco Jr. (Cagayan–1st)
  Nolasco Jr. will not run. His father, Ramon Sr. will run in his place.
3. Vincent Garcia (Davao City–2nd)
  Garcia will not run. His nephew, Javi Campos Garcia, member of the Davao City Council, is running in his place under Partido Federal ng Pilipinas.
4. Alan Dujali (Davao del Norte–2nd)
  Dujali will run for governor of Davao del Norte.
5. Inno Dy (Isabela–6th)
  Dy will not run. His father, Faustino Dy III. will run in his place.
6. Ruth Mariano-Hernandez (Laguna–2nd)
  Mariano-Hernandez will run for governor of Laguna. Her husband, Ramil, the incumbent governor, is running to succeed her.
7. Ma. Cynthia Chan (Lapu-Lapu City–at-large)
  Chan is running for mayor of Lapu-Lapu City, Her husband, Junard, the incumbent mayor, is running to succeed her.
8. Richard Kho (Masbate–1st)
  Kho will run for governor of Masbate. His father, Antonio, the incumbent governor is running to succeed him.
9. Ara Kho (Masbate–2nd)
  Kho will run for mayor of Masbate City. Her mother, Elisa Olga, the incumbent vice governor, is running to succeed her.
10. Stella Quimbo (Marikina–2nd)
  Quimbo will run for mayor of Marikina. Quimbo's husband, former Representative Miro Quimbo, will seek a return to the congressional seat and run in her place.
11. Edwin Olivarez (Parañaque–1st)
  Olivarez is running to return to the mayoral post in Parañaque. He is swapping places with his brother, incumbent mayor Eric Olivarez, who is seeking a return to his former congressional seat.
12. Luz Mercado (Southern Leyte–1st)
13. Bai Rihan Sakaluran (Sultan Kudarat–1st)
  Sakaluran will run for mayor of Isulan.

=== Liberal incumbents ===
1. Romulo Peña Jr. (Makati–1st)
  Peña is running for vice mayor of Makati. He endorsed Monique Lagdameo, the incumbent vice mayor, to succeed him.

=== Nacionalista incumbents ===
1. Camille Villar (Las Piñas at-large)
  Villar will run for senator.
2. Nelson Dayanghirang (Davao Oriental–1st)
  Dayanghirang Sr. will run for Governor of Davao Oriental. His son, Vice Governor Nelson Jr. will run in his place.
3. Michael Gorriceta (Iloilo–2nd)
4. Khymer Adan Olaso (Zamboanga City–1st)
  Olaso is running for mayor of Zamboanga City. His brother, Kaiser will run in his place.

=== NPC incumbents ===
1. Josephine Veronique Lacson-Noel (Malabon at-large)
  Lacson-Noel will run for Mayor of Malabon. Her husband Bem will seek congressional seat.
2. Gerardo Valmayor Jr. (Negros Occidental–1st)
3. Christian T. Yap (Tarlac–2nd)
  Yap will run for Governor of Tarlac. His uncle Victor will run in his place.

=== NUP incumbents ===
1. Pablo John Garcia (Cebu–3rd)
  Garcia withdrew his candidacy and was replaced by his wife, Karen Hope.
2. Paul Daza (Northern Samar–1st)
3. Harris Christopher Ongchuan (Northern Samar–2nd)
  Ongchuan will run for governor. His cousin, Governor Edwin Ongchuan will run in his place.
4. Joseph Gilbert Violago (Nueva Ecija–2nd)
5. Dan Fernandez (Santa Rosa at-large)
  Fernandez will run for governor of Laguna.
6. Marjorie Ann Teodoro (Marikina–1st)
  Teodoro is running for mayor of Marikina. Her husband, Marcelino, the incumbent mayor, is running to succeed her.

=== PFP incumbents ===
1. Jam Agarao (Laguna–4th)
  Agarao will run for Laguna Provincial Board member.
2. Jose Maria Zubiri Jr. (Bukidnon–3rd)
  Zubri's daughter-in-law Audrey Zubiri is running to succeed him.

=== Party-list incumbents ===
1. Bonifacio Bosita (1-Rider)
  Bosita will run for senator as an independent. None of 1-Rider's nominees are his relatives.
2. Wilbert T. Lee (Agri)
  Lee will run for senator under Aksyon Demokratiko, but later withdrew. His wife Delphine is Agri's #1 nominee.
3. Erwin Tulfo (ACT-CIS)
  Tulfo will run for senator under Lakas–CMD. His sister-in-law Jocelyn is ACT-CIS's #2 nominee.
4. Sam Verzosa (Tutok To Win)
  Verzosa will run for mayor of Manila as an independent. Several Verzosas are nominees of Tutok To Win

== Party-list representatives now running in congressional districts ==
These are party-list representatives who are eligible for another House term, but opted to run in congressional districts:

1. Brian Yamsuan (Bicol Saro)
  Yamsuan will run for representative of Parañaque's 2nd congressional district as an independent.
2. Migs Nograles (PBA)
  Nograles will run for representative of Davao City's 1st congressional district as an independent.
3. Jorge Antonio Bustos (Patrol)
  Bustos will run for representative of Pampanga's 4th congressional district as an independent.
4. Jil Bongalon (Ako Bicol)
  Bongalon will run for representative of Albay's 1st congressional district under Lakas–CMD.
5. Argel Joseph Cabatbat (Magsasaka)
  Cabatbat will run for representative of Nueva Ecija's 1st congressional district as an independent.

== District representatives now running under the party-list system ==
These are representatives from congressional districts who are eligible for another House term, but opted to run under the party-list system:

1. Munir Arbison Jr. (Sulu–2nd, Lakas)
  Arbison is running under KAPUSO PM. His father Abdulmunir Mundoc is running to succeed him.

== Mid-term vacancies ==
The following vacated their seats in the middle of Congress, ordered by date of vacancy:

1. Jesus Crispin Remulla (NUP; Cavite–7th)
  Remulla resigned his rights to sit after accepting his appointment as Secretary of Justice on May 23, 2022. On the ensuing special election, his son Crispin Diego won.
2. Romeo Jalosjos Jr. (Nacionalista, Zamboanga del Norte–1st)
  Jalosjos vacated the seat after the Supreme Court injunction on July 21, 2022. The court then declared his 2022 election opponent Roberto Uy Jr. as the rightful winner.
3. Rex Gatchalian (NPC, Valenzuela–1st)
  Gatchalian was appointed Secretary of Social Welfare and Development on January 31, 2023. In the general election, his brother Kenneth is running to succeed him.
4. Nicolas Enciso VIII (Bicol Saro, party-list)
  Enciso was dropped from the rolls on February 15, 2023, and was later replaced by Brian Yasmuan.
5. Jeffrey Soriano (ACT-CIS, party-list)
  Soriano resigned on February 22, 2023, and was later replaced by Erwin Tulfo (see above).
6. Arnolfo Teves Jr. (NPC, Negros Oriental–3rd)
  Teves was expelled by Congress on August 16, 2023. A special election was scheduled in December 2023, but was cancelled. In the general election, Teves's aunt Janice is running to succeed him.
7. Bem Noel (An Waray, party-list)
  Noel was dropped from the rolls on September 27, 2023. The COMELEC cancelled An Waray's registration, and no replacement was named. In the general election, he is running for House representative from Malabon.
8. Edward Hagedorn (PDP–Laban, Palawan–3rd)
  Hagedorn died on October 3, 2023. In the general election, his son Clink is running to succeed him.
9. Ralph Recto (Nacionalista, Batangas–6th)
  Recto was appointed Secretary of Finance on January 12, 2024. In the general election, his son Ryan Christian is running to succeed him.
10. Edgardo Salvame (PRP, Palawan–1st)
  Edgardo Salvame died on March 13, 2024. In the general election, his widow Rosalie is running succeed him.
11. Elpidio Barzaga Jr. (NUP, Cavite–4th)
  Barzaga died on April 27, 2024. In the general election, his son Kiko is running to succeed him.
12. Jose Francisco Benitez (PFP, Negros Occidental–3rd)
  Benitez was appointed Director-General of the Technical Education and Skills Development Authority on August 16, 2024. His nephew, Javi, incumbent mayor of Victorias, is running to succeed him.
13. Edcel Lagman (Liberal, Albay–1st)
  Lagman died on January 30, 2025. His daughter, Krisel, incumbent mayor of Tabaco, is running to succeed him.

The following party-list seats have remained vacant from the entirety of the 19th Congress, until election day.

1. P3PWD won one seat in the 2022 partylist election. However, a disqualification case was filed against Rowena Guanzon, their #1 nominee. Guanzon was named as the #1 nominee after the election, after the initial five nominees renounced the seat. The Supreme Court granted an injunction preventing Guanzon from taking office. In 2024, the Supreme Court granted the petition voiding Guanzon's substitution as nominee, and ordered P3PWD to submit a new set of nominees. P3PWD named Maria Camille Ilagan as their #1 nominee, and was proclaimed by the Commission on Elections in late 2024. As she was not seated by the House of Representatives, the party asked the Supreme Court to intervene in February 2025.
