= Congressional districts of the Philippines =

Electoral district for the House of Representatives of the Philippines

- Category: Electoral district
- Location: Philippines
- Number: 254 (as of 2022)
- Populations: 18,831–1,239,688
- Areas: 4.08–7,725.90 km^{2} (1.58–2,982.99 sq mi)
- Government: Congress of the Philippines

Congressional districts of the Philippines (Filipino: distritong pangkapulungan) refers to the electoral districts or constituencies in which the country is divided for the purpose of electing 254 of the 318 members of the House of Representatives (with the other 64 being elected through a system of party-list proportional representation). The country is currently divided into 254 congressional districts, also known as legislative districts or representative districts, with each one representing at least 250,000 people or one entire province. The 1987 Constitution of the Philippines initially provided for a maximum 200 congressional districts or 80 percent of the maximum 250 seats for the lower house, with the remaining 20 percent or 50 seats allotted for sectoral or party-list representatives. This number has since been revised with the enactment of several laws creating more districts pursuant to the 1991 Local Government Code.

Philippine congressional districts are contiguous and compact territories composed of adjacent local government units where practicable. They are single-member districts which return one member each to the lower chamber, elected to serve a maximum of three consecutive three-year terms through a first-past-the-post voting system. The Philippine Statistics Authority conducts a constitutionally mandated quinquennial census whose figures are used to determine the number of congressional districts to which each province or city is entitled, in a process called apportionment.

There are currently 254 congressional districts in the Philippines. Voting representatives are elected from these districts to the lower house of the Congress of the Philippines every three years. In 1946, there were originally 98 congressional districts, this number increased to 200 after the 1987 constitution was created and new redistricting articles were mandated.

== Apportionment ==
The Philippines constitution mandates a nationwide reapportionment of setting boundaries for legislative districts; however, the legislature has not approved a reapportionment bill since 1987. Following the ‘one person, one vote’ doctrine, political territories are expected to be symmetric and have limited variance in the size of its constituencies. However, many new districts have been created that defy the basic requisites for redistricting as the constitution fails to clearly expound the due process for apportionment and redistricting. This has resulted in unequal representation in districts such as Calacoon City, and Batanes being represented by one legislator each, despite containing populations of 1.2 million and 17 000 people respectively.

Philippine's 254 congressional districts are composed of territories within provinces, cities and municipalities. From an American perspective, provinces are equivalent to states, and below that is the city/municipality which is equivalent to a city/town in the United States. Provinces are represented by governors and can be split into multiple congressional districts, each of which elects a congressman. Provincial governors allocate resources and control patronage in municipalities across all congressional districts in the province, thus have greater exposure and power than a representative from a single district.

== Delimitation ==
There has been no official delimitation process in the Philippines since the 1987 constitution's ratification. As per Article 6 of the constitution, the requisites for creation of a legislative district are as follows:

- Should comprise territories that are practicably contiguous, compact and adjacent.
- Contiguous territory of at least 2,000 square kilometres, as certified by the Lands Management Bureau.
- A population of at least 250,000 inhabitants as certified by the National Statistics office.

Since 1987, 43 districts have been newly added due to the creation of new cities and provinces, sundering from existing provinces, and piecemeal redistricting. As incumbents control the institutions that determine the rules for redistricting, many of the congressional districts are allegedly gerrymandered to ensure the elite persistence of select families that form the Philippines' political dynasties. This is illustrated by the Marcos family which remained in power from 1987 to 2008 in almost 50 congressional districts, despite term limits.

== List ==
- Abra
- Agusan del Norte
- Agusan del Sur
- Aklan
- Albay
- Antipolo
- Antique
- Apayao
- Aurora
- Basilan
- Bacolod
- Baguio
- Bataan
- Batanes
- Batangas
- Benguet
- Biliran
- Biñan
- Bohol
- Bukidnon
- Bulacan
- Butuan
- Cagayan
- Cagayan de Oro
- Calamba
- Caloocan
- Camarines Norte
- Camarines Sur
- Camiguin
- Capiz
- Catanduanes
- Cavite
- Cebu
- Cebu City
- Cotabato
- Davao City
- Davao de Oro
- Davao del Norte
- Davao del Sur
- Davao Occidental
- Davao Oriental
- Dinagat Islands
- Eastern Samar
- General Santos
- Guimaras
- Ifugao
- Iligan
- Ilocos Norte
- Ilocos Sur
- Iloilo
- Iloilo City
- Isabela
- Kalinga
- La Union
- Laguna
- Lanao del Norte
- Lanao del Sur
- Lapu-Lapu
- Las Piñas
- Leyte
- Maguindanao del Norte
- Maguindanao del Sur
- Makati
- Malabon
- Mandaluyong
- Manila
- Marikina
- Marinduque
- Masbate
- Misamis Occidental
- Misamis Oriental
- Mountain Province
- Muntinlupa
- Navotas
- Negros Occidental
- Negros Oriental
- Northern Samar
- Nueva Ecija
- Nueva Vizcaya
- Occidental Mindoro
- Oriental Mindoro
- Palawan
- Pampanga
- Pangasinan
- Parañaque
- Pasay
- Pasig
- Pateros
- Quezon
- Quezon City
- Quirino
- Rizal
- Romblon
- Samar
- San Jose del Monte
- San Juan
- Santa Rosa
- Sarangani
- Siquijor
- Sorsogon
- South Cotabato
- Southern Leyte
- Sultan Kudarat
- Sulu
- Surigao del Norte
- Surigao del Sur
- Taguig
- Tarlac
- Tawi-Tawi
- Valenzuela
- Zambales
- Zamboanga City
- Zamboanga del Norte
- Zamboanga del Sur
- Zamboanga Sibugay

District	Region	Electorate (2025)	Population (2024)	Area (km^{2})	Representative	Party
Abra's at-large	CAR	188,957	246,948	4,165.25	Joseph Bernos	Lakas
Agusan del Norte's at-large	XIII	272,163	404,100	2,730.24	Dale Corvera	PFP
Agusan del Sur's 1st	XIII	214,205	366,819	4,472.97	Alfel Bascug	NUP
Agusan del Sur's 2nd	XIII	232,437	373,712	5,516.55	Eddiebong Plaza	NUP
Aklan's 1st	VI	209,532	321,601	1,033.75	Jess Marquez	NPC
Aklan's 2nd	VI	205,358	312,821	787.67	Florencio Miraflores	NPC
Albay's 1st	V	274,912	398,170	547.88	Krisel Lagman	Liberal
Albay's 2nd	V	327,382	484,409	665.94	Caloy Loria	NUP
Albay's 3rd	V	337,820	496,819	1,361.95	Adrian Salceda	Lakas
Antipolo's 1st	IV-A	212,925	391,807	35.15	Ronaldo Puno	NUP
Antipolo's 2nd	IV-A	242,872	521,905	258.57	Bong Acop	NUP
Antique's at-large	VI	399,553	643,173	2,729.17	Antonio Legarda Jr.	NPC
Apayao's at-large	CAR	83,441	126,587	4,413.35	Eleanor Begtang	NPC
Aurora's at-large	III	157,240	240,824	3,147.32	Rommel T. Angara	LDP
Bacolod's at-large	NIR	355,880	624,787	162.67	Albee Benitez	PFP
Baguio's at-large	CAR	166,416	368,426	57.51	Mauricio Domogan	Lakas
Basilan's at-large	BARMM	315,601	693,244	1,327.23	Yusop Alano	PFP
Bataan's 1st	III	163,095	239,187	357.92	Antonino Roman III	Lakas
Bataan's 2nd	III	199,306	302,042	318.24	Albert Garcia	NUP
Bataan's 3rd	III	223,643	350,211	696.82	Maria Angela Garcia	NUP
Batanes' at-large	II	13,655	18,937	219.01	Jun Gato	NPC
Batangas' 1st	IV-A	419,735	650,985	924.83	Leandro Legarda Leviste	Lakas
Batangas' 2nd	IV-A	208,306	307,269	399.14	Gerville Luistro	Lakas
Batangas' 3rd	IV-A	515,378	809,698	545.73	King Collantes	NPC
Batangas' 4th	IV-A	329,711	481,184	757.69	Caloy Bolilia	Nacionalista
Batangas' 5th	IV-A	228,263	358,267	282.96	Beverley Dimacuha	Nacionalista
Batangas' 6th	IV-A	257,401	387,392	209.40	Ryan Recto	Nacionalista
Benguet's at-large	CAR	249,729	473,190	2,769.08	Eric Yap	Lakas
Biliran's at-large	VIII	124,191	184,095	536.01	Gerardo Espina Jr.	Lakas
Biñan's at-large	IV-A	227,474	584,479	43.50	Arman Dimaguila	PFP
Bohol's 1st	VII	327,862	478,745	1,002.68	John Geesnell Yap	NUP
Bohol's 2nd	VII	326,937	478,035	1,640.57	Vanvan Aumentado	Lakas
Bohol's 3rd	VII	326,765	455,946	2,187.54	Alexie Tutor	Lakas
Bukidnon's 1st	X	217,275	350,473	2,681.51	Jose Manuel Alba	Lakas
Bukidnon's 2nd	X	267,163	423,583	3,297.07	Jonathan Keith Flores	Lakas
Bukidnon's 3rd	X	311,057	499,956	3,219.57	Audrey Zubiri	PFP
Bukidnon's 4th	X	200,241	327,890	1,300.44	Laarni Roque	Nacionalista
Bulacan's 1st	III	449,028	781,607	385.73	Danny Domingo	NUP
Bulacan's 2nd	III	236,272	375,698	147.48	Tina Pancho	NUP
Bulacan's 3rd	III	286,844	441,252	1,445.50	Cholo Violago	PFP
Bulacan's 4th	III	287,554	552,603	117.94	Linabelle Villarica	PFP
Bulacan's 5th	III	317,655	508,874	119.23	Agay Cruz	PFP
Bulacan's 6th	III	285,359	531,084	462.28	Salvador Pleyto	PFP
Butuan's at-large	XIII	220,694	385,530	816.62	Jose Aquino II	Lakas
Cagayan's 1st	II	280,282	462,712	4,221.45	Ramon Nolasco	PFP
Cagayan's 2nd	II	210,751	329,098	2,751.40	Baby Alfonso	PFP
Cagayan's 3rd	II	294,961	492,866	2,322.90	Joseph Lara	Lakas
Cagayan de Oro's 1st	X	211,679	394,984	377.81	Lordan Suan	PFP
Cagayan de Oro's 2nd	X	203,016	346,633	123.50	Rufus Rodriguez	CDP
Calamba's at-large	IV-A	364,766	575,046	149.50	Cha Hernandez	Lakas
Caloocan's 1st	NCR	377,294	982,077	34.86	Oscar Malapitan	Nacionalista
Caloocan's 2nd	NCR	237,712	393,552	8.40	Edgar Erice	Liberal
Caloocan's 3rd	NCR	150,243	337,316	12.54	Dean Asistio	Lakas
Camarines Norte's 1st	V	196,307	302,721	1,491.05	Josefina Tallado	NPC
Camarines Norte's 2nd	V	200,276	301,945	829.02	Rosemarie Panotes	Lakas
Camarines Sur's 1st	V	142,177	202,514	1,097.88	Hori Horibata	NUP
Camarines Sur's 2nd	V	222,775	338,897	819.21	Luigi Villafuerte	NUP
Camarines Sur's 3rd	V	339,588	557,193	614.51	Nelson Legacion	Lakas
Camarines Sur's 4th	V	314,684	464,452	2,010.75	Arnulf Bryan Fuentebella	NPC
Camarines Sur's 5th	V	324,838	500,258	954.68	Miguel Luis Villafuerte	NUP
Camiguin's at-large	X	66,557	94,892	237.95	Jurdin Jesus Romualdo	Lakas
Capiz's 1st	VI	286,934	456,606	730.41	Howard Guintu	Independent
Capiz's 2nd	VI	252,525	378,492	1,864.23	Jane Castro	Lakas
Catanduanes' at-large	V	200,804	261,169	1,492.16	Eulogio Rodriguez	PFP
Cavite's 1st	IV-A	261,336	381,048	88.34	Jolo Revilla	Lakas
Cavite's 2nd	IV-A	309,462	661,381	46.17	Lani Mercado	Lakas
Cavite's 3rd	IV-A	238,853	481,949	64.70	Adrian Jay Advincula	NUP
Cavite's 4th	IV-A	432,844	744,511	90.13	Vacant	
Cavite's 5th	IV-A	315,944	602,212	251.75	Roy Loyola	NPC
Cavite's 6th	IV-A	212,830	482,453	81.46	Antonio Ferrer	NUP
Cavite's 7th	IV-A	363,491	681,482	246.51	Crispin Diego Remulla	NUP
Cavite's 8th	IV-A	312,602	538,848	558.10	Aniela Tolentino	NUP
Cebu's 1st	VII	495,807	829,521	527.06	Rhea Gullas	Lakas
Cebu's 2nd	VII	181,873	259,191	740.67	Edsel Galeos	Lakas
Cebu's 3rd	VII	397,831	621,931	1,258.08	Karen Flores-Garcia	NUP
Cebu's 4th	VII	355,168	552,064	740.41	Sun Shimura	NUP
Cebu's 5th	VII	419,986	665,645	877.67	Duke Frasco	1CEBU
Cebu's 6th	VII	153,450	226,846	89.05	Daphne Lagon	Lakas
Cebu's 7th	VII	168,055	245,324	641.62	Patricia Calderon	NPC
Cebu City's 1st	VII	326,007	402,689	130.43	Rachel del Mar	NUP
Cebu City's 2nd	VII	395,462	562,643	142.14	Eduardo Rama Jr.	Lakas
Cotabato's 1st	XII	246,037	403,870	2,420.58	Edwin Cruzado	Lakas
Cotabato's 2nd	XII	276,804	434,416	3,321.37	Rudy Caogdan	Nacionalista
Cotabato's 3rd	XII	274,768	447,856	3,266.95	Samantha Santos	Lakas
Davao City's 1st	XI	366,439	650,568	1,010.77	Paolo Duterte	HTL
Davao City's 2nd	XI	332,318	645,734	830.37	Omar Duterte	HTL
Davao City's 3rd	XI	307,835	552,645	1,298.97	Isidro Ungab	HTL
Davao de Oro's 1st	XI	245,824	350,181	2,069.03	Maricar Zamora	PFP
Davao de Oro's 2nd	XI	302,566	433,594	2,410.74	Jhong Ceniza	Lakas
Davao del Norte's 1st	XI	347,453	560,373	2,395.64	De Carlo Uy	Lakas
Davao del Norte's 2nd	XI	369,996	583,558	1,031.33	Jose Manuel Lagdameo	PFP
Davao del Sur's at-large	XI	465,227	705,129	2,163.98	John Tracy Cagas	Lakas
Davao Occidental's at-large	XI	205,167	317,598	2,163.45	Claude Bautista	NPC
Davao Oriental's 1st	XI	174,878	226,743	3,209.91	Nelson Dayanghirang Jr.	Lakas
Davao Oriental's 2nd	XI	258,767	363,299	2,469.73	Cheeno Almario	Lakas
Dinagat Islands' at-large	XIII	81,673	120,533	1,036.34	Kaka Bag-ao	Liberal
Eastern Samar's at-large	VIII	359,570	472,683	4,660.47	Sheen Gonzales	NUP
General Santos' at-large	XII	368,454	722,059	492.86	Shirlyn Bañas-Nograles	PFP
Guimaras's at-large	VI	124,930	192,874	604.57	JC Rahman Nava	NUP
Ifugao's at-large	CAR	136,318	208,668	2,628.21	Solomon Chungalao	NPC
Iligan's at-large	X	189,050	368,132	813.37	Celso Regencia	Lakas
Ilocos Norte's 1st	I	228,771	318,758	2,047.42	Sandro Marcos	PFP
Ilocos Norte's 2nd	I	207,316	300,092	1,420.47	Angelo Barba	Nacionalista
Ilocos Sur's 1st	I	205,761	299,998	518.73	Ronald Singson	NPC
Ilocos Sur's 2nd	I	281,472	409,993	2,077.27	Kristine Singson-Meehan	NPC
Iloilo's 1st	VI	234,519	377,167	840.27	Janette Garin	Lakas
Iloilo's 2nd	VI	223,656	355,924	606.88	Kathryn Joyce Gorriceta	Lakas
Iloilo's 3rd	VI	275,733	460,006	1,405.43	Lorenz Defensor	NUP
Iloilo's 4th	VI	266,462	407,492	976.95	Ferjenel Biron	Nacionalista
Iloilo's 5th	VI	318,739	482,027	1,171.30	Binky April Tupas	Lakas
Iloilo City's at-large	VI	330,621	473,728	78.34	Julienne Baronda	Lakas
Isabela's 1st	II	265,453	415,979	4,519.71	Tonypet Albano	PFP
Isabela's 2nd	II	127,579	204,241	2,890.49	Ed Christopher Go	PFP
Isabela's 3rd	II	180,353	285,737	686.27	Ian Paul Dy	Lakas
Isabela's 4th	II	196,747	271,505	1,922.44	Joseph Tan	PFP
Isabela's 5th	II	172,212	272,358	981.43	Mike Dy III	Lakas
Isabela's 6th	II	183,197	283,228	1,414.59	Bojie Dy	PFP
Kalinga's at-large	CAR	158,555	235,391	3,231.25	Caroline Agyao	PFP
La Union's 1st	I	245,584	378,381	706.56	Paolo Ortega	Lakas
La Union's 2nd	I	308,690	446,691	791.14	Dante Garcia	Lakas
Laguna's 1st	IV-A	188,803	348,968	24.05	Ann Matibag	PFP
Laguna's 2nd	IV-A	350,865	552,034	140.28	Ramil Hernandez	Lakas
Laguna's 3rd	IV-A	372,861	613,846	487.87	Loreto Amante	PFP
Laguna's 4th	IV-A	403,696	582,052	1,017.91	Benjamin Agarao Jr.	PFP
Lanao del Norte's 1st	X	177,487	332,877	1,092.82	Imelda Dimaporo	PFP
Lanao del Norte's 2nd	X	206,724	428,848	2,253.75	Aminah Dimaporo	Lakas
Lanao del Sur's 1st	BARMM	403,831	803,184	7,402.11	Zia Alonto Adiong	Lakas
Lanao del Sur's 2nd	BARMM	303,088	564,953	6,092.26	Yasser Balindong	Lakas
Lapu-Lapu City's at-large	VII	277,288	497,813	58.10	Junard Chan	PFP
Las Piñas' at-large	NCR	318,542	615,549	32.69	Mark Anthony Santos	Independent
Leyte's 1st	VIII	335,609	553,733	988.74	Martin Romualdez	Lakas
Leyte's 2nd	VIII	305,526	430,160	1,476.72	Lolita Javier	NPC
Leyte's 3rd	VIII	133,378	180,273	651.64	Anna Veloso-Tuazon	NUP
Leyte's 4th	VIII	353,329	504,098	1,450.84	Richard Gomez	PFP
Leyte's 5th	VIII	273,212	414,547	1,947.11	Carl Cari	Lakas
Maguindanao del Norte's at-large	BARMM	530,526	1,124,811	3,988.82	Dimple Mastura	Lakas
Maguindanao del Sur's at-large	BARMM	451,687	813,243	4,728.90	Esmael Mangudadatu	PFP
Makati's 1st	NCR	216,152	269,326	16.31	Monique Lagdameo	MKTZNU
Makati's 2nd	NCR	54,088	40,444	0.78	Alden Almario	MKTZNU
Malabon's at-large	NCR	233,868	389,929	15.71	Antolin Oreta III	NUP
Mandaluyong's at-large	NCR	223,624	465,902	21.26	Alexandria Gonzales	NUP
Mandaue's at-large	VII	236,853	364,482	34.87	Emmarie Dizon	Lakas
Manila's 1st	NCR	267,797	436,427	4.57	Ernix Dionisio	NUP
Manila's 2nd	NCR	149,095	201,515	4.08	Rolando Valeriano	NUP
Manila's 3rd	NCR	156,053	237,005	6.24	Joel Chua	NUP
Manila's 4th	NCR	172,679	285,409	5.14	Giselle Lazaro-Maceda	NPC
Manila's 5th	NCR	227,051	428,791	11.56	Irwin Tieng	NUP
Manila's 6th	NCR	169,499	313,443	7.79	Benny Abante	NUP
Marikina's 1st	NCR	127,290	177,647	9.03	Marcelino Teodoro	NUP
Marikina's 2nd	NCR	188,690	293,676	13.62	Miro Quimbo	PFP
Marinduque's at-large	Mimaropa	165,436	226,522	952.58	Reynaldo Salvacion	Lakas
Masbate's 1st	V	128,429	178,295	814.48	Antonio Kho	Lakas
Masbate's 2nd	V	274,067	404,926	2,053.25	Olga Kho	Lakas
Masbate's 3rd	V	216,678	327,592	1,284.05	Wilton Kho	Lakas
Misamis Occidental's 1st	X	200,224	275,673	1,000.76	Jason Almonte	Nacionalista
Misamis Occidental's 2nd	X	237,177	346,320	1,054.46	Ando Oaminal	Lakas
Misamis Oriental's 1st	X	300,911	419,657	1,481.17	Karen Lagbas	NUP
Misamis Oriental's 2nd	X	390,691	568,408	1,650.35	Yevgeny Emano	Nacionalista
Mountain Province's at-large	CAR	121,647	149,775	2,157.38	Maximo Dalog Jr.	Nacionalista
Muntinlupa's at-large	NCR	314,934	552,225	39.75	Jaime Fresnedi	Liberal
Navotas' at-large	NCR	157,065	252,878	10.77	Toby Tiangco	Navoteño
Negros Occidental's 1st	NIR	257,408	387,242	1,436.59	Jules Ledesma	NPC
Negros Occidental's 2nd	NIR	212,207	369,983	967.77	Alfredo Marañon III	NUP
Negros Occidental's 3rd	NIR	317,481	492,149	942.29	Javi Benitez	PFP
Negros Occidental's 4th	NIR	247,306	412,527	750.86	Jeffrey Ferrer	NUP
Negros Occidental's 5th	NIR	301,233	473,046	1,220.00	Dino Yulo	Lakas
Negros Occidental's 6th	NIR	310,217	545,530	2,485.03	Mercedes Alvarez–Lansang	NPC
Negros Oriental's 1st	NIR	292,029	465,196	1,797.44	Emmanuel Iway	PFP
Negros Oriental's 2nd	NIR	375,249	560,321	1,480.26	Maisa Sagarbarria	Lakas
Negros Oriental's 3rd	NIR	308,907	466,521	2,107.83	Janice Degamo	Lakas
Northern Samar's 1st	VIII	253,112	351,751	1,937.46	Niko Raul Daza	NUP
Northern Samar's 2nd	VIII	196,079	294,038	1,755.47	Edwin Ongchuan	PFP
Nueva Ecija's 1st	III	400,221	618,880	1,027.38	Mika Suansing	PFP
Nueva Ecija's 2nd	III	329,147	508,176	1,897.18	Kokoy Salvador	PFP
Nueva Ecija's 3rd	III	466,379	665,376	1,384.55	Jay Vergara	PFP
Nueva Ecija's 4th	III	424,419	603,384	1,351.76	Emerson Pascual	Lakas
Nueva Vizcaya's at-large	II	303,090	530,106	3,975.67	Tim Cayton	PFP
Occidental Mindoro's at-large	Mimaropa	321,699	511,417	5,865.71	Leody Tarriela	PFP
Oriental Mindoro's 1st	Mimaropa	308,447	489,388	2,015.19	Arnan Panaligan	Lakas
Oriental Mindoro's 2nd	Mimaropa	261,154	430,116	2,223.19	Alfonso Umali Jr.	Liberal
Palawan's 1st	Mimaropa	302,220	474,547	7,725.90	Rosalie Salvame	NUP
Palawan's 2nd	Mimaropa	275,287	454,276	6,116.50	Jose Alvarez	NPC
Palawan's 3rd	Mimaropa	210,248	356,356	3,188.35	Gil Acosta Jr.	Lakas
Pampanga's 1st	III	441,218	923,929	240.77	Carmelo Lazatin Jr.	PFP
Pampanga's 2nd	III	372,379	696,945	815.48	Gloria Macapagal Arroyo	Lakas
Pampanga's 3rd	III	475,143	838,872	431.17	Mica Gonzales	Lakas
Pampanga's 4th	III	386,049	610,152	575.05	Anna York Bondoc	NUP
Pangasinan's 1st	I	303,690	456,894	1,758.81	Arthur Celeste	Nacionalista
Pangasinan's 2nd	I	365,279	518,738	1,080.26	Mark Cojuangco	NPC
Pangasinan's 3rd	I	454,801	713,514	584.07	Maria Rachel Arenas	Lakas
Pangasinan's 4th	I	350,022	497,112	274.35	Gina de Venecia	Lakas
Pangasinan's 5th	I	357,155	528,814	585.67}	Ramon Guico Jr.	Lakas
Pangasinan's 6th	I	325,359	473,468	1,175.09	Marlyn Primicias-Agabas	Lakas
Parañaque's 1st	NCR	139,653	282,014	17.06	Eric Olivarez	Lakas
Parañaque's 2nd	NCR	213,621	421,231	27.99	Brian Yamsuan	NUP
Pasay's at-large	NCR	292,695	453,186	13.97	Antonino Calixto	Lakas
Pasig's at-large	NCR	463,885	853,050	31.00	Roman Romulo	NPC
Quezon's 1st	IV-A	377,065	582,712	4,178.81	Mark Enverga	NPC
Quezon's 2nd	IV-A	516,199	767,044	825.38	David Suarez	Lakas
Quezon's 3rd	IV-A	304,144	452,287	1,986.20	Reynante Arrogancia	NPC
Quezon's 4th	IV-A	298,748	458,626	2,079.21	Keith Micah Tan	NPC
Quezon City's 1st	NCR	217,676	416,906	19.16	Arjo Atayde	NUP
Quezon City's 2nd	NCR	328,316	752,989	26.62	Ralph Tulfo	PFP
Quezon City's 3rd	NCR	172,497	339,527	22.16	Franz Pumaren	NUP
Quezon City's 4th	NCR	234,450	437,039	22.86	Bong Suntay	NPC
Quezon City's 5th	NCR	281,197	610,202	52.01	Patrick Michael Vargas	PFP
Quezon City's 6th	NCR	220,275	527,607	21.72	Marivic Co-Pilar	NUP
Quirino's at-large	II	130,307	210,841	2,323.47	Midy Cua	Lakas
Rizal's 1st	IV-A	555,121	1,239,688	174.35	Mia Ynares	NPC
Rizal's 2nd	IV-A	306,943	535,309	474.46	Dino Tanjuatco	NPC
Rizal's 3rd	IV-A	134,335	276,449	55.09	Jose Arturo Garcia Jr.	NPC
Rizal's 4th	IV-A	219,447	451,383	172.65	Dennis Hernandez	NPC
Romblon's at-large	Mimaropa	211,336	302,824	1,533.45	Eleandro Jesus Madrona	Nacionalista
Samar's 1st	VIII	289,756	342,213	2,269.14	Stephen James Tan	Nacionalista
Samar's 2nd	VIII	335,787	463,966	3,778.89	Reynolds Michael Tan	Lakas
San Jose del Monte's at-large	III	310,314	685,688	105.53	Arthur Robes	Lakas
San Juan's at-large	NCR	100,639	134,312	5.95	Bel Zamora	Lakas
Santa Rosa's at-large	IV-A	231,659	430,920	54.84	Roy Gonzales	PFP
Sarangani's at-large	XII	373,178	580,915	3,601.25	Steve Solon	PFP
Siquijor's at-large	NIR	81,404	107,642	337.49	Zaldy Villa	PFP
Sorsogon's 1st	V	282,352	452,203	1,103.73	Dette Escudero	NPC
Sorsogon's 2nd	V	270,888	392,863	1,015.28	Wowo Fortes	NPC
South Cotabato's 1st	XII	195,438	297,574	957.97	Ed Lumayag	PFP
South Cotabato's 2nd	XII	211,517	341,950	630.45	Dinand Hernandez	PFP
South Cotabato's 3rd	XII	222,412	370,485	2,347.53	Dibu Tuan	Lakas
Southern Leyte's 1st	VIII	134,738	201,376	528.94	Roger Mercado	PFP
Southern Leyte's 2nd	VIII	165,267	232,996	1,269.67	Christopherson Yap	Lakas
Sultan Kudarat's 1st	XII	275,693	442,794	2,327.08	Ruth Sakaluran	Lakas
Sultan Kudarat's 2nd	XII	257,691	420,857	2,971.26	Bella Suansing	PFP
Sulu's 1st	IX	262,367	676,741	1,101.53	Samier Tan	Lakas
Sulu's 2nd	IX	202,026	469,356	989.17	Abdulmunir Mundoc Arbison	Lakas
Surigao del Norte's 1st	XIII	113,571	145,806	622.56	Francisco Matugas	PFP
Surigao del Norte's 2nd	XIII	293,485	419,838	1,350.37	Bernadette Barbers	Nacionalista
Surigao del Sur's 1st	XIII	276,452	374,422	3,410.64	Romeo Momo	Nacionalista
Surigao del Sur's 2nd	XIII	200,237	274,436	1,522.06	Alexander Pimentel	PFP
Taguig–Pateros' at-large	NCR	345,062	635,902	22.11	Ading Cruz	Nacionalista
Taguig's at-large	NCR	307,232	739,502	25.17	Daniel Bocobo	Nacionalista
Tarlac's 1st	III	285,992	459,390	960.04	Jaime Cojuangco	NPC
Tarlac's 2nd	III	355,968	614,509	1,107.87	Cristy Angeles	PFP
Tarlac's 3rd	III	294,043	494,263	985.69	Bong Rivera	NPC
Tawi-Tawi's at-large	BARMM	255,632	482,645	1,087.40	Dimszar Sali	NUP
Valenzuela's 1st	NCR	210,330	360,942	25.82	Kenneth Gatchalian	NPC
Valenzuela's 2nd	NCR	228,226	364,231	18.69	Gerald Galang	Lakas
Zambales's 1st	III	253,317	491,338	982.01	Jay Khonghun	Lakas
Zambales's 2nd	III	298,819	454,790	2,848.82	Doris Maniquiz	Lakas
Zamboanga City's 1st	IX	224,316	470,841	211.21	Katrina Reiko Chua-Tai	PFP
Zamboanga City's 2nd	IX	258,742	548,008	1,203.49	Jerry Perez	NUP
Zamboanga del Norte's 1st	IX	189,224	232,172	1,536.29	Pinpin Uy	Lakas
Zamboanga del Norte's 2nd	IX	309,959	427,675	2,018.60	Irene Labadlabad	Lakas
Zamboanga del Norte's 3rd	IX	281,357	407,220	3,746.11	Ian Amatong	Liberal
Zamboanga del Sur's 1st	IX	429,807	626,884	2,180.49	Joseph Yu	Lakas
Zamboanga del Sur's 2nd	IX	283,148	418,242	2,318.97	Victoria Yu	Lakas
Zamboanga Sibugay's 1st	IX	179,359	282,984	1,393.27	Marlo Bancoro	PFP
Zamboanga Sibugay's 2nd	IX	249,063	378,514	2,214.48	Marly Hofer–Hasim	PFP

== See also ==
- Senatorial districts of the Philippines
- Parliamentary districts of Bangsamoro
- Lists of electoral districts by nation
