= Edwin Jubahib =

Filipino politician (born 1974)

The Honorable Edwin Jubahib
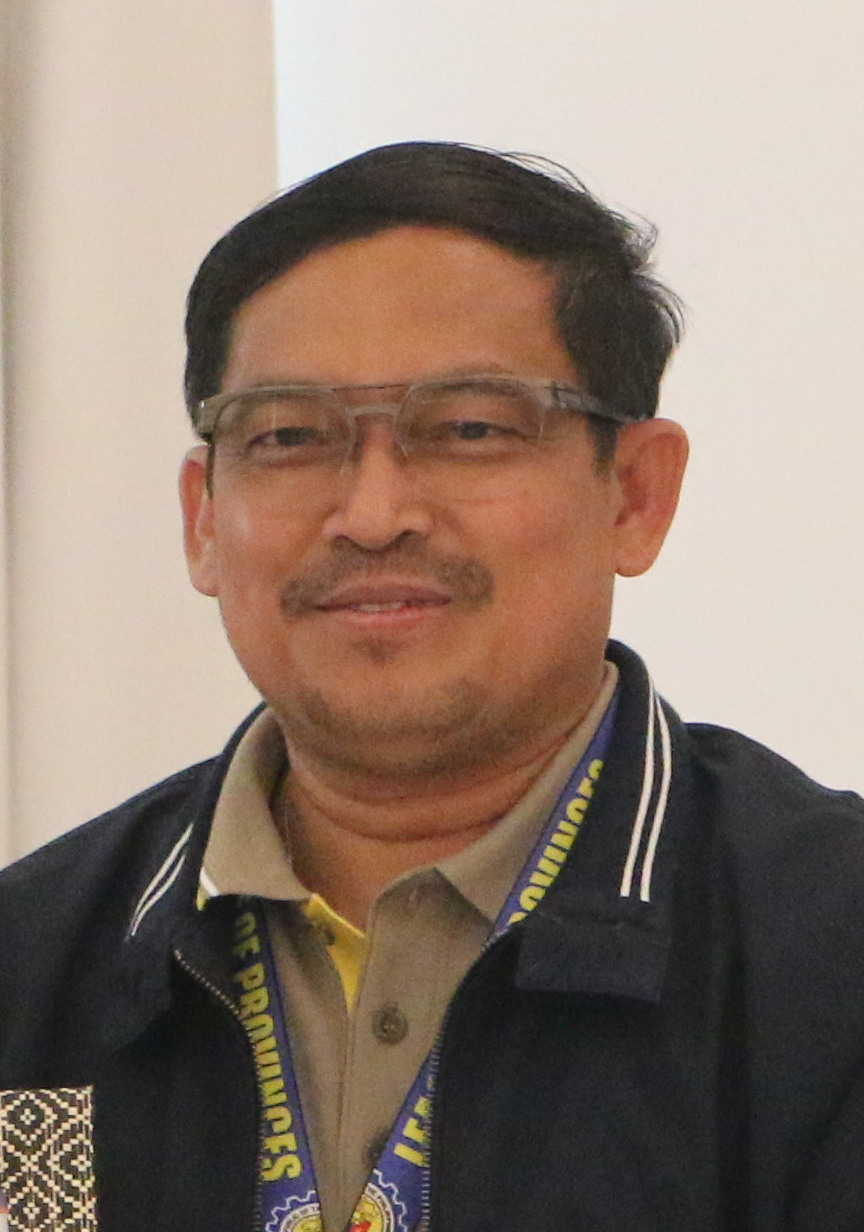
- Jubahib in 2023

Governor of Davao del Norte
- Incumbent
- Assumed office June 30, 2019 (Suspended: April 8, 2024 – July 8, 2024) (Note: During Jubahib's suspension, Vice Governor De Carlo Uy served as acting governor.)
- Vice Governor: Rey Uy (2019–2022); De Carlo Uy (2022–2025); Clarice Jubahib (2025–Present)
- Preceded by: Antonio Rafael del Rosario

Personal details
- Born: Edwin Ignacio Jubahib; April 27, 1974 (age 52) Panabo, Davao del Norte, Philippines
- Party: PFP (2023–present)
- Other political affiliations: Reporma (2021–2023); PDP–Laban (2018–2021)
- Spouse: Lotis T. Jubahib
- Children: Clarice, Louise, and Elijah
- Education: University of Mindanao

Edwin Ignacio Jubahib (born April 27, 1974), is a Filipino politician serving as governor of Davao del Norte since 2019. He was also the personal assistant of congressman and former speaker Pantaleon Alvarez.

== Early life ==
Jubahib was born to an indigent family of farmers in Barangay New Visayas, Panabo, Davao (now Davao del Norte). He studied at New Visayas Elementary School and Panabo Provincial High School while supplementing his family's income through farmwork, selling vegetables, and other odd jobs. He earned his Bachelor of Science degree in criminology from the University of Mindanao in nearby Davao City. He then worked for a bus company starting as a conductor and was promoted to inspector, and later assistant operations manager. In 2004, he went to Japan after securing an apprenticeship in technical engineering. Upon his return to the Philippines, he started his construction company.

== Political career ==
In 2010, Jubahib served as regional campaign manager of Senator Manny Villar's presidential campaign. During that time, he met and befriended politician Pantaleon Alvarez. He then worked as Alvarez's personal assistant.

In 2018, Congressman Alvarez and PDP–Laban fielded Jubahib as their gubernatorial candidate for the 2019 elections. Jubahib defeated Rodolfo "Rodney" del Rosario Jr., ending the Del Rosario political dynasty's 40-year rule in Davao del Norte.

Jubahib and Alvarez participated in the 2022 election as leaders of Partido Reporma, after the latter resigned from PDP–Laban in 2020. In the presidential election, they initially supported Senator Panfilo Lacson but later dropped him in favor of Vice President Leni Robredo. Jubahib and Alvarez both won their respective reelection bids. Their ticket won three of the ten seats in the Davao del Norte Provincial Board, as well as 4 of the 11 mayorships in the province.

On April 8, 2024, the office of President Bongbong Marcos imposed a 60-day preventive suspension on Jubahib after complaints were filed against him for "misuse of authority, potential oppression, and the utilization of government funds to advance the interests of a private company." The complaint was filed by provincial board member Orly Amit, who accused Jubahib of taking his government-issued car in what he called an "abuse of authority". Amit's complaint was received by the Office of the President in July 2023, who then asked for Jubahib's response. Jubahib replied in October 2023, after two extensions. In an April 11 address, Jubahib explained that he recalled Amit's government-issued car in November 2022 to allow the Provincial Engineer's Office to use it for a month, after which it was returned to Amit. He described the incident as "too irrelevant for them to issue a suspension order." He then alleged that the suspension was politically motivated and declared that he would defy the order. His supporters subsequently occupied the provincial capitol in Tagum to prevent the implementation of the suspension. Vice Governor De Carlo "Oyo" Uy assumed the role of acting governor that same day.

On June 7, Jubahib was suspended by the Office of the President for another 30 days due to his direct involvement and use of government vehicles in a rally against the Northern Davao Electric Cooperative (Nordeco). A vocal critic of Nordeco citing its frequent power interruptions, Jubahib had acknowledged that he requested for provincial employees' participation in the protest. After the 90-day suspension, Jubahib officially returned to office on July 8.

As of October 2024, Jubahib was no longer a member of Partido Reporma. He filed his reelection bid under Partido Federal ng Pilipinas with his daughter Clarice as his running mate, citing his desire to work with a supportive vice governor. Meanwhile, the term-limited congressman Alvarez ran against Clarice. However, Jubahib clarified that he and Alvarez remained good friends. In the 2025 elections, Jubahib secured a third and final consecutive term. Meanwhile, Clarice defeated Alvarez.

== Electoral history ==
2019 Davao del Norte gubernatorial election
Party	Candidate	Votes	%
PDP–Laban	Edwin Jubahib	280,335	62.25
Hugpong	Rodolfo del Rosario Jr.	169,982	37.75
Total votes		450,317	100.00

2022 Davao del Norte gubernatorial election
Party	Candidate	Votes	%
Reporma	Edwin Jubahib	310,947	60.9%
Hugpong	Roy Catalan	202,112	39.4%
Total votes		513,059	100.00

2025 Davao del Norte gubernatorial election
Party	Candidate	Votes	%
PFP	Edwin Jubahib	322,974	58.03%
Lakas	Alan Dujali	233,582	41.97%
Total votes		556,556	100.00
