= Davao del Norte Provincial Board =

Legislative body of the province of Davao del Norte, Philippines

Davao del Norte Provincial Board Sangguniang Panlalawigan ng Davao del Norte

Type
- Type: Unicameral
- Term limits: 3 terms (9 years)

Leadership
- Presiding Davao del Norte Provincial Board: Clarice T. Jubahib (PFP) since June 30, 2025

Structure
- Seats: 14 board members 1 ex officio presiding officer
- Political groups: PFP (4) Lakas (5) Independent (1) TBD (1) Nonpartisan (3)
- Length of term: 3 years
- Authority: Local Government Code of the Philippines

Elections
- Voting system: Multiple non-transferable vote (regular members); Indirect election (ex officio members); Acclamation (sectoral member)
- Last election: May 12, 2025
- Next election: May 15, 2028

Meeting place
- New Legislative Building, Provincial Government Center, Tagum City

The Davao del Norte Provincial Board is the Sangguniang Panlalawigan (provincial legislature) of the Philippine province of Davao del Norte.

The members are elected via plurality-at-large voting: the province is divided into two districts, each having five seats. A voter votes up to five names, with the top five candidates per district being elected. The vice governor is the ex officio presiding Davao del Norte Provincial Board, and only votes to break ties. The vice governor is elected via the plurality voting system province-wide.

The districts used in appropriation of members is coextensive with the legislative districts of Davao del Norte.

Aside from the regular members, the board also includes the provincial federation presidents of the Liga ng mga Barangay (ABC, from its old name "Association of Barangay Captains"), the Sangguniang Kabataan (SK, youth councils) and the Philippine Councilors League (PCL). Davao del Norte's provincial board also has a reserved seat for its indigenous people (IPMR).

== Apportionment ==
Elections	Seats per district		Ex officio seats	Reserved seats	Total seats
Elections	1st	2nd	Ex officio seats	Reserved seats	Total seats
2010–present	5	5	3	1	14

== List of members ==
=== Current members ===
These are the members after the 2025 local elections and 2023 barangay and SK elections

- Vice Governor: Clarice T. Jubahib (PFP)

Seat	Board member	Party	Start of term	End of term
1st district	Lou C. Suaybaguio	PFP	June 30, 2025	June 30, 2028
1st district	Prospero E. Estabillo Jr.	PFP	June 30, 2019	June 30, 2028
1st district	Tristan Royce R. Aala	Lakas	June 30, 2025	June 30, 2028
1st district	Mary Jane L. Ang	Lakas	June 30, 2025	June 30, 2028
1st district	Ronald S. Eliot	PFP	June 30, 2025	June 30, 2028
2nd district	Janris Jay G. Relampagos	PFP	June 30, 2025	June 30, 2028
2nd district	Flopone Royle A. Catalan	Lakas	June 30, 2022	June 30, 2028
2nd district	Al David T. Uy	Independent	June 30, 2025	June 30, 2028
2nd district	Orly A. Amit	Lakas	June 30, 2022	June 30, 2028
2nd district	Wendel M. Enad	Lakas	June 30, 2025	June 30, 2028
ABC	Norman P. Librero	Nonpartisan		
PCL	TBD		June 30, 2025	June 30, 2028
SK	Helen Mae I. Discaya	Nonpartisan		
IPMR	Datu Ariel S. Macla	Nonpartisan		

=== Vice Governor ===
Election year	Name	Party	Ref.
2016	Alan R. Dujali	Independent	
2019	Rey T. Uy	PDP–Laban	
2022	De Carlo L. Uy	Hugpong	
2025	Clarice T. Jubahib	PFP	

=== 1st District ===
- Population (2024):

Election year	Member (party)	Member (party)	Member (party)	Member (party)	Member (party)	Ref.
2016	Vicente Eliot (Liberal)	Shirley Belen R. Aala (Liberal)	Alfredo B. de Veyra III (Liberal)	Raymond Joey D. Millan (Liberal)	Francisco C. Remitar (Independent)	
2019	Robert Lao L. So (PDP–Laban)	Nickandro T. Suaybaguio, Jr. (PDP–Laban)	Prospero E. Estabillo, Jr. (PDP–Laban)	Roger Laguna (PDP–Laban)	Francisco T. Remitar (PDP–Laban)	
2022	Robert Lao L. So (Hugpong)	Nickandro T. Suaybaguio, Jr. (Reporma)	Prospero E. Estabillo, Jr. (Reporma)	Shirley Belen R. Aala (HNP)	Francisco T. Remitar (Reporma)	
2025	Ronald S. Eliot (PFP)	Lou C. Suaybaguio (PFP)	Prospero E. Estabillo, Jr. (PFP)	Tristan Royce R. Aala (Lakas)	Mary Anne L. Ang (Lakas)	

=== 2nd District ===
- Population (2024):

Election year	Member (party)	Member (party)	Member (party)	Member (party)	Member (party)	Ref.
2016	Rodolfo G. del Rosario, Jr. (KB)	Roy Catalan (KB)	Ernesto Evangelista, Sr. (KB)	Hernanie L. Duco (KB)	Jannet Tanong (Independent)	
2019	Franklin D. Gentiles (PDP–Laban)	Roy Catalan (HNP)	Janris Jay G. Relampagos (PDP–Laban)	Daniel A. Lu (until 2021) (HNP)	Jannet Tanong (HNP)	
2019	Franklin D. Gentiles (PDP–Laban)	Roy Catalan (HNP)	Janris Jay G. Relampagos (PDP–Laban)	Denise Marianne A. Lu (since 2021) (Independent)	Jannet Tanong (HNP)	
2022	Orly A. Amit (HNP)	Roy Catalan (HNP)	Emanuel G. Pamisaran (HNP)	Denise Marianne A. Lu (HNP)	Jannet Tanong (HNP)	
2025	Orly A. Amit (Lakas)	Flopone Royle A. Catalan (Lakas)	Wendel M. Enad (Lakas)	Janris Jay G. Relampagos (PFP)	Al David T. Uy (Independent)	
