= Tarragona, Davao Oriental =

Municipality in Davao Oriental, Philippines

Tarragona
- Municipality
- Municipality of Tarragona
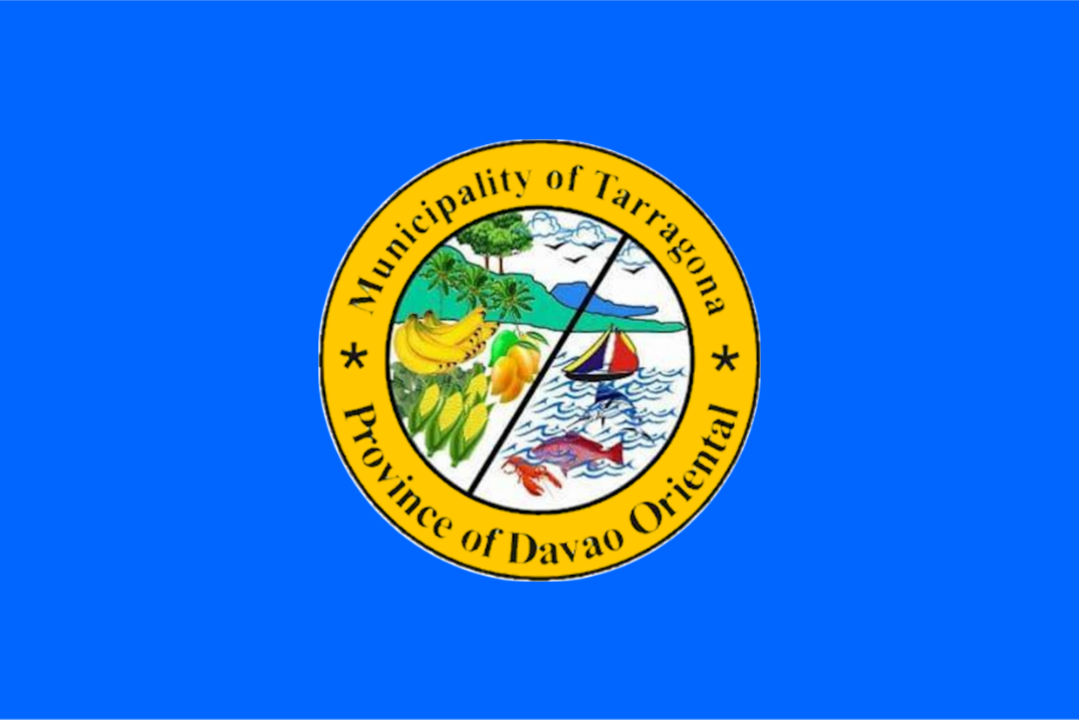
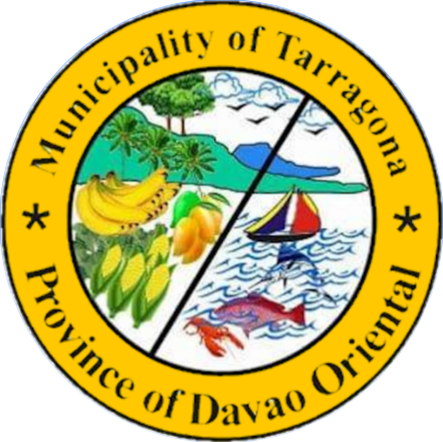
- Flag Seal

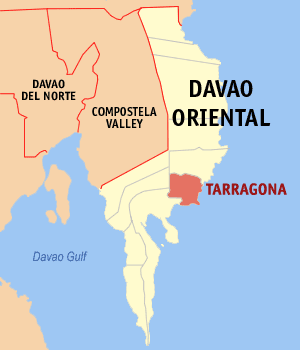
- Map of Davao Oriental with Tarragona highlighted
- Interactive map of Tarragona
- Location within the Philippines
- Coordinates: 7°02′57″N 126°26′49″E
- Country: Philippines
- Region: Davao Region
- Province: Davao Oriental
- District: 1st district
- Named for: Tarragona, Spain
- Barangays: 10 (see Barangays)

Government
  - Type: Sangguniang Bayan
  - Mayor: Kaka Bulaong
  - Vice Mayor: Nestor L. Uy
  - Representative: Nelson "Jr" Dayanghirang
  - Municipal Council: Members: Rem-rem Manlabian; Maureen Malintad-Castro; Atty. Mark Virgilio; Marve Blawis Tesoy; Maureen Malintad; Reach Batonon; Ramain Matayab; Ian Dilag
  - Electorate: 24,884 voters (2025)

Area
  - Total: 300.76 km^{2} (116.12 sq mi)
- Elevation: 178 m (584 ft)
- Highest elevation: 1,733 m (5,686 ft)
- Lowest elevation: 0 m (0 ft)

Population (2024 census)
  - Total: 27,349
  - Density: 90.933/km^{2} (235.52/sq mi)
  - Households: 5,632

Economy
  - Income class: 2nd municipal income class
  - Poverty incidence: 45.68% (2023)
  - Revenue: ₱ 192 million (2024)
  - Assets: ₱ 545.4 million (2024)
  - Expenditure: ₱ 213.7 million (2024)
  - Liabilities: ₱ 204.6 million (2024)

Service provider
  - Electricity: Davao Oriental Electric Cooperative (DORECO)
- Time zone: UTC+8 (PST)
- ZIP code: 8201
- PSGC: 1102511000
- IDD : area code: +63 (0)87
- Native languages: Davawenyo; Surigaonon; Cebuano; Kalagan; Kamayo; Tagalog
- Website: www.tarragona.gov.ph

Tarragona, officially the Municipality of Tarragona (Cebuano: Lungsod sa Tarragona; Tagalog: Bayan ng Tarragona), is a municipality in the province of Davao Oriental, Philippines. According to the 2024 census, it has a population of 27,349 people.

== Geography ==
=== Barangays ===
Tarragona is politically subdivided into 10 barangays. Each barangay consists of puroks while some have sitios.

- Cabagayan
- Central (Poblacion)
- Dadong
- Jovellar
- Limot
- Lucatan
- Maganda
- Ompao
- Tomoaong
- Tubaon

=== Climate ===
Tarragona has a tropical rainforest climate (Af) with heavy rainfall year-round.

Climate data for Tarragona
Month	Jan	Feb	Mar	Apr	May	Jun	Jul	Aug	Sep	Oct	Nov	Dec	Year
Mean daily maximum °C (°F)	30.4 (86.7)	30.6 (87.1)	31.5 (88.7)	32.2 (90.0)	32.0 (89.6)	31.4 (88.5)	31.2 (88.2)	31.4 (88.5)	31.7 (89.1)	31.8 (89.2)	31.6 (88.9)	30.9 (87.6)	31.4 (88.5)
Daily mean °C (°F)	26.0 (78.8)	26.2 (79.2)	26.7 (80.1)	27.4 (81.3)	27.5 (81.5)	27.0 (80.6)	26.8 (80.2)	26.9 (80.4)	27.0 (80.6)	27.2 (81.0)	27.0 (80.6)	26.5 (79.7)	26.9 (80.3)
Mean daily minimum °C (°F)	21.7 (71.1)	21.8 (71.2)	22.0 (71.6)	22.6 (72.7)	23.0 (73.4)	22.6 (72.7)	22.4 (72.3)	22.5 (72.5)	22.4 (72.3)	22.6 (72.7)	22.4 (72.3)	22.2 (72.0)	22.3 (72.2)
Average rainfall mm (inches)	321 (12.6)	254 (10.0)	184 (7.2)	142 (5.6)	132 (5.2)	148 (5.8)	129 (5.1)	115 (4.5)	106 (4.2)	146 (5.7)	151 (5.9)	234 (9.2)	2,062 (81)
Source: Climate-Data.org

== Demographics ==
Population census of Tarragona
Year	Pop.	±% p.a.
1970	9,468	—
1975	11,149	+3.33%
1980	14,122	+4.84%
1990	18,495	+2.73%
1995	19,779	+1.27%
2000	22,846	+3.14%
2007	24,363	+0.89%
2010	25,671	+1.92%
2015	26,225	+0.41%
2020	26,996	+0.61%
2024	27,349	+0.31%
Source: Philippine Statistics Authority

== Economy ==
Poverty incidence of Tarragona (%)

Source: Philippine Statistics Authority
