= Corazon Malanyaon =

Filipino politician (1949–2023)

The Honorable Corazon Malanyaon
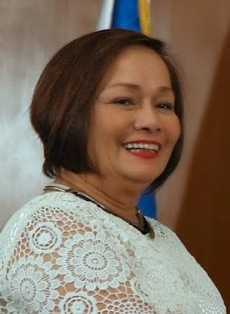
- Malanyaon in 2014

9th Governor of Davao Oriental
- In office June 30, 2022 – June 28, 2023
- Vice Governor: Niño Uy
- Preceded by: Nelson Dayanghirang Sr.
- Succeeded by: Niño Uy
- In office June 30, 2007 – June 30, 2016
- Vice Governor: Joel Mayo Z. Almario
- Preceded by: Ma. Elena T. Palma Gil
- Succeeded by: Nelson Dayanghirang Sr.

Member of the Philippine House of Representatives from Davao Oriental's 1st district
- In office June 30, 2016 – June 30, 2022
- Preceded by: Nelson Dayanghirang Sr.
- Succeeded by: Nelson Dayanghirang Sr.
- In office June 30, 2001 – June 30, 2007
- Preceded by: Ma. Elena T. Palma Gil
- Succeeded by: Nelson Dayanghirang Sr.

Vice Mayor of Davao City
- Acting; November 12, 1990 – January 11, 1991
- Mayor: Dominador B. Zuño Jr.
- Preceded by: Dominador B. Zuño Jr.
- Succeeded by: Dominador B. Zuño Jr.

Member of the Davao City Council from the 3rd district
- In office January 11, 1991 – June 30, 1992
- In office February 2, 1988 – November 12, 1990
- Officer in Charge; May 9, 1986 – November 27, 1987

Personal details
- Born: Corazon Toroba Nuñez; August 22, 1949 Cateel, Davao, Philippines
- Died: June 28, 2023 (aged 73) Davao City, Philippines
- Party: Nacionalista (2009–2023); HNP (2018–2023)
- Other political affiliations: KAMPI (2006–2009); NPC (2000–2005); PDP–Laban (1986–1992)
- Spouse: Luis Malanyaon Jr.
- Children: 1
- Education: Ateneo de Davao University (BS, LLB)
- Occupation: Politician
- Profession: Accountant • lawyer

Corazon "Cora" Toroba Nuñez-Malanyaon (August 22, 1949 – June 28, 2023) was a Filipino politician, lawyer, and accountant who served as the representative of Davao Oriental's 1st district from 2016 to 2022 and from 2001 to 2007. She also served twice as the governor of Davao Oriental from 2007 to 2016 and again from 2022 until her death in 2023. Malanyaon started her political career as a member of the Davao City Council from 1986 to 1987 and from 1988 to 1992.

== Early life ==
Corazon Toroba Nuñez was born on August 22, 1949, and raised in Cateel, Davao province (now part of Davao Oriental), where she graduated valedictorian in elementary and high school. She moved to Davao City to study commerce, major in accountancy and minor in finance and management, at Ateneo de Davao University, where she graduated cum laude. She later earned her Bachelor of Laws from the same university, also graduating cum laude.

Before joining politics, she worked as an accountant and lawyer specializing in corporate law and taxation, and also taught at her alma mater. She married businessman Luis Malanyaon Jr. They had a daughter, Michelle.

== Political career ==
Malanyaon first became involved in politics during the final years of the authoritarian presidency of Ferdinand Marcos, when she joined PDP–Laban and the Davao City-based Yellow Friday Movement which supported Corazon Aquino in the 1986 snap presidential election. After the 1986 People Power Revolution, Malanyaon was appointed by the revolutionary government of Aquino as officer-in-charge (OIC) member of the Davao City Council, serving until November 1987. The city council was presided by then-OIC Vice Mayor Rodrigo Duterte. Malanyaon became a duly elected councilor in the 1988 local elections, earning the most votes in the 3rd district. She served in that position until 1992.

In 2001, Malanyaon returned to her hometown of Cateel and successfully ran for a seat in the House of Representatives for the province's 1st district in the 2001 elections. She served for two consecutive terms until 2007 as a member of the Nationalist People's Coalition. Although eligible to run for another congressional term, she chose to run for governor of Davao Oriental under Kabalikat ng Malayang Pilipino in the 2007 elections. Malanyaon won against incumbent governor Maria Elena Palma Gil, her relative and former political ally. In the 2010 elections, she ran under the Nacionalista Party and won a landslide victory over Ruben Feliciano of Pwersa ng Masang Pilipino. She was unopposed in the 2013 elections and completed her three consecutive terms in 2016.

In the 2016 elections, Malanyaon switched posts with Nelson Dayanghirang Sr., whom she endorsed as her successor. Malanyaon and Dayanghirang won their respective bids. She was re-elected in 2019, running under the Hugpong ng Pagbabago while remaining a Nacionalista.

In the 2022 elections, she ran unopposed and was elected governor for a fourth nonconsecutive term, switching offices once again with Dayanghirang.

== Death ==
Malanyaon died at a hospital in Davao City on June 28, 2023, after experiencing difficulty breathing during an event in Banaybanay. She was 73. Prior to her death, she was reported to have suffered from health problems, complicated by a series of strokes in January 2022. She was buried at the Davao Memorial Park in Davao City nine days later.
