= Cheeno Almario =

Filipino politician (born 1993)

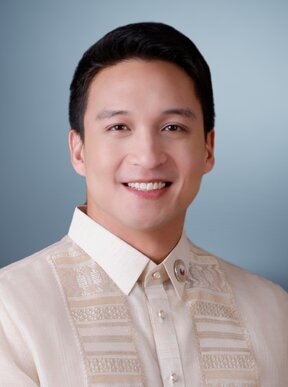
- Official portrait, 2025

Member of the House of Representatives from Davao Oriental's 2nd District
- Incumbent
- Assumed office June 30, 2022
- Preceded by: Joel Almario

Member of Mati City Council
- In office June 30, 2019 – June 30, 2022

Personal details
- Born: Cheeno Miguel Diez Almario; January 14, 1993 (age 33) Mati, Davao Oriental, Philippines
- Party: NPC (2026–present)
- Other political affiliations: Lakas (2022–2026); PDP–Laban (2018–2022)
- Spouse: Migs Nograles (m. 2024)
- Children: 1
- Education: Far Eastern University (BS)

Cheeno Miguel Diez Almario (born January 14, 1993) is a Filipino politician. He is the incumbent representative of the 2nd district of Davao Oriental in the House of Representatives of the Philippines, which he began representing in 2022. He was also a member of the Mati City Council from 2019 to 2022.

== Early life and education ==
Almario was born on January 14, 1993 in Mati, Davao Oriental to Joel Almario and Nancy Diez. His grandmother Thelma Almario, was a representative of the second district of Davao Oriental from 1987 to 1998 and lastly from 2007 to 2016. His great-granduncle Manuel Zosa, was also a representative from the sixth district of Cebu.

He studied at the Ateneo de Manila High School for his high school education. He studied Far Eastern University with the degree of Bachelor of Science in Business Administration.

== Political career ==
=== Mati City Council (2019–2022) ===
Almario was elected as member of the Mati City Council from 2019 to 2022.

=== House of Representatives (2022–present) ===
Almario represented the second district of Davao Oriental after he succeeded his father in 2022.

== Personal life ==
In October 2024, Almario married Migs Nograles in a private ceremony. They have one daughter together.

== Electoral history ==
Electoral history of Cheeno Almario
Year	Office	Party	Votes received				Result
Year	Office	Party	Total	%	P.	Swing	Result
2019	Councilor of Mati	PDP–Laban	32,829	—N/a	1st	—N/a	Won
2022	Representative (Davao Oriental–2nd)	PDP–Laban	110,892	58.43%	1st	—N/a	Won
2025	Representative (Davao Oriental–2nd)	Lakas	128,454	60.93%	1st	—N/a	Won

House of Representatives of the Philippines
Preceded by Joel Almario	Representative for Davao Oriental's 2nd district 2022–present	Incumbent
