= Jose Manuel Lagdameo =

Filipino industrial engineer and politician (born 1974)

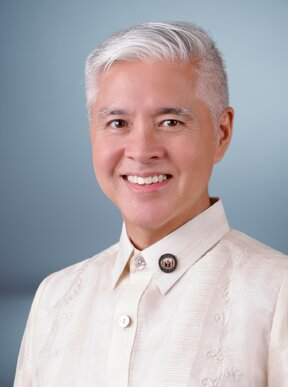
- Official portrait, 2025

Member of the House of Representatives from Davao del Norte's 2nd District
- Incumbent
- Assumed office June 30, 2025
- Preceded by: Alan Dujali

Personal details
- Born: Jose Manuel Floirendo Lagdameo; March 1, 1974 (age 52) Philippines
- Party: PFP (2024–present)
- Parent(s): Antonio Manuel Lagdameo (father); Linda Floirendo (mother)
- Relatives: Antonio Lagdameo Jr. (brother); Antonio Floirendo Sr. (grandfather)
- Education: Lehigh University (BS)
- Occupation: Politician, businessman
- Profession: Industrial engineer

Jose Manuel Floirendo Lagdameo (born March 1, 1974), also known as JM Lagdameo, is a Filipino industrial engineer, businessman and politician. He currently serves as the representative of the 2nd District of Davao del Norte in the House of Representatives of the Philippines, assuming office on June 30, 2025.

== Personal life ==
Lagdameo is the brother of businessman and Special Assistant to the President Antonio Manuel Lagdameo Jr., and a grandson of banana magnate Don Antonio Floirendo Sr.

== Political career ==
In the 2025 elections, Lagdameo was elected as representative of the 2nd District of Davao del Norte, which includes the towns of Panabo, Carmen, and Dujali. He succeeded Rep. Alan Dujali.
