= Nelson Dayanghirang Jr. =

Filipino politician (born 1993)

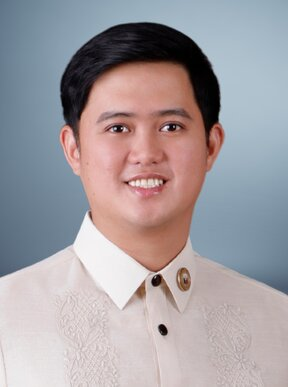
- Official portrait, 2025

Member of the Philippine House of Representatives from Davao Oriental's 1st congressional district
- Incumbent
- Assumed office June 30, 2025
- Preceded by: Nelson Dayanghirang Sr.

Vice Governor of Davao Oriental
- In office June 28, 2023 – June 30, 2025
- Governor: Niño Sotero L. Uy Jr.
- Preceded by: Niño Sotero L. Uy Jr.
- Succeeded by: Glenda Rabat-Gayta

Member of the Davao Oriental Provincial Board from 1st district
- In office June 30, 2019 – June 28, 2023

Personal details
- Born: June 17, 1993 (age 33) Davao City, Philippines
- Party: Lakas (2024–present)
- Other political affiliations: Nacionalista (2018–2024); HNP (2018–2022)
- Parent: Nelson Dayanghirang Sr. (father)
- Occupation: Politician

Nelson Restor Dayanghirang Jr. (born June 17, 1993) is a Filipino politician serving as the representative of Davao Oriental's 1st congressional district since 2025.

== Early years ==
Dayanghirang Jr. was born on June 17, 1993, in Davao City, Philippines. He is the son of Governor Nelson Dayanghirang Sr. and Nanette Restor.

== Political career ==
=== Board Member (2019–2023) ===
Dayanghirang Jr. entered politics as a member of the Davao Oriental Provincial Board from 2019 to 2023.

=== Vice Governor of Davao Oriental (2023–2025) ===
He later served as Vice Governor of Davao Oriental from 2023 until 2025.

=== House of Representatives (2025–present) ===
In 2025, he was elected as the representative of the 1st congressional district of Davao Oriental.

== Electoral history ==
Electoral history of Nelson Dayanghirang Jr.
Year	Office	Party	Votes received				Result
Year	Office	Party	Total	%	P.	Swing	Result
2019	Board Member (Davao Oriental–1st)	Nacionalista	72,811	—N/a	1st	—N/a	Won
2022	Board Member (Davao Oriental–1st)	Nacionalista	80,631	18.54%	1st	—N/a	Won
2025	Representative (Davao Oriental–1st)	Lakas	89,269	61.70%	1st	—N/a	Won
