= Alan Dujali =

Filipino politician (born 1968)

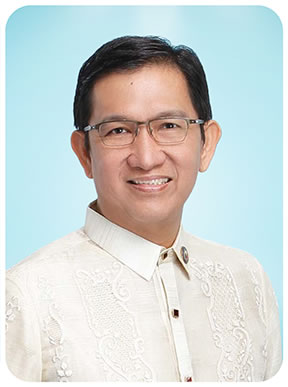
- Official portrait, 2022

Member of the House of Representatives from Davao del Norte’s 2nd district
- In office June 30, 2019 – June 30, 2025
- Preceded by: Antonio Floirendo Jr.
- Succeeded by: Jose Manuel Lagdameo

Vice Governor of Davao del Norte
- In office June 30, 2016 – June 30, 2019
- Governor: Antonio del Rosario
- Preceded by: Victorio Suaybaguio Jr.
- Succeeded by: Rey Uy

Member of the Davao del Norte Provincial Board from the 2nd district
- In office June 30, 2010 – June 30, 2016

Member of the Panabo City Council
- In office March 31, 2001 – June 30, 2004

Member of the Panabo Municipal Council
- In office June 30, 1995 – March 31, 2001

Personal details
- Born: Alan Ruales Dujali; September 21, 1968 (age 58)
- Party: Lakas (until 2009; 2022–present)
- Other political affiliations: HNP (2021–2022); PDP–Laban (2018–2021); Independent (2009–2018); KAMPI (2007–2008)
- Education: University of the Immaculate Conception; University of Bohol (MPA)
- Occupation: Politician

Alan "Aldu" Ruales Dujali (born September 21, 1968) is a Filipino politician. A member of the Lakas–CMD, he represented the 2nd District of Davao del Norte in the House of Representatives of the Philippines from 2019 to 2025.

== Early life and education ==
Dujali was born on September 21, 1968, to Ben Ricardo Dujali, an engineer and served as vice mayor of Panabo from 1981 to 1986 and Maria Clara Ruales. He studied Panabo Central Elementary School for his primary education. He studied Maryknoll High School of Panabo for his secondary education. He also studied University of the Immaculate Conception for his tertiary education. He took up master's degree in public administration at the University of Bohol.

== Political career ==
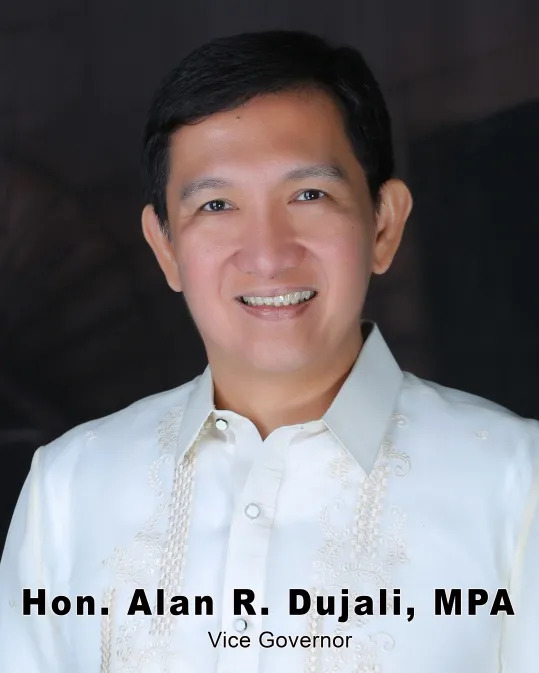
Portrait of Dujali during his term as Vice Governor of Davao del Norte

Dujali started entered politics when he was a councilor in Panabo from 1995 to 2004. He served for three consecutive terms.

In 2010, Dujali became a member of Davao del Norte Provincial Board for two terms.

In 2016, Dujali was elected as vice governor of Davao del Norte until 2019.

In 2019, Dujali was elected as representative of second district of Davao del Norte.

In 2025, Dujali ran as governor of Davao del Norte but he lost to Edwin Jubahib and garnered only 233,582 votes.

== Personal life ==
Dujali is married to Ana Dujali, a candidate for second district representative of Davao del Norte but she lost to Jose Manuel Lagdameo.
