= Governor of Davao Oriental =

Local chief executive

- Gobernador ng Davao Oriental (Filipino)
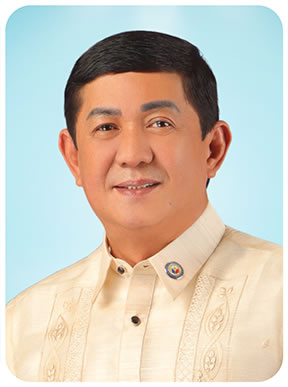
- Incumbent; Nelson Dayanghirang Sr. since June 28, 2025
- Style: Honorable
- Term length: Three years per term, can serve for up to three consecutive terms
- Inaugural holder: Paciano V. Bangoy
- Formation: 1967

The governor of Davao Oriental is the executive head of the province of Davao Oriental. The inaugural holder of the post is Paciano Bangoy.

== List ==
No.	Image	Governor	Term	Party
1		Paciano V. Bangoy	July 1967 – December 1967	
2		Leopoldo Lopez	1968 – 1971	
3		Teodoro Palma Gil	1972 – 1978	
4		Francisco Rabat	1978 – 1986	
5		Josefina S. Sibala	April 1986 – November 1987	
OIC		Teodoro Palma Gil	November 1987 – February 1988	
6		Leopoldo N. Lopez	February 1988 – August 1991	
–		Josefina S. Sibala	August 1991 – June 1992	
7		Rosalind Y. Lopez	June 1992 – June 2001	
8		Maria Elena Palma Gil	June 30, 2001 – June 30, 2007	Lakas
9		Corazon Malanyaon	June 30, 2007 – June 30, 2016	KAMPI
9		Corazon Malanyaon	June 30, 2007 – June 30, 2016	Nacionalista
10		Nelson Dayanghirang Sr.	June 30, 2016 – June 30, 2022	Hugpong
–		Corazon Malanyaon	June 30, 2022 – June 28, 2023	Nacionalista
11		Niño Sotero L. Uy Jr.	June 28, 2023 – June 30, 2025	Nacionalista
–		Nelson Dayanghirang Sr.	June 30, 2025 – present	Nacionalista
