= Davao del Norte's 2nd congressional district =

Legislative district of the Philippines

- Constituency for the House of Representatives of the Philippines
- Location of Davao del Norte within the Philippines
- Province: Davao del Norte
- Region: Davao Region
- Population: 572,415 (2020)
- Electorate: 304,306 (2019)
- Major settlements: 5 LGUs: Cities; Panabo; Samal; Municipalities; Braulio E. Dujali; Carmen; Santo Tomas
- Area: 1,031.33 km^{2} (398.20 sq mi)

Current constituency
- Created: 1987
- Representative: JM Lagdameo
- Political party: PFP
- Congressional bloc: Majority

Davao del Norte's 2nd congressional district is one of the two congressional districts of the Philippines in the province of Davao del Norte. It has been represented in the House of Representatives since 1987. The district covers the western and coastal areas of the province, namely the cities of Panabo and Samal, and the municipalities of Braulio E. Dujali, Carmen and Santo Tomas. Prior to redistricting in 1998, the district covered parts of what is now the province of Davao de Oro, as well as the capital, Tagum, in what is now the 1st district. It is currently represented in the 20th Congress by JM Lagdameo of the Partido Federal ng Pilipinas (PFP).

== Representation history ==
#	Image	Member	Term of office		Congress	Party	Electoral history	Constituent LGUs
#	Image	Member	Start	End	Congress	Party	Electoral history	Constituent LGUs
=== Davao del Norte's 2nd district for the House of Representatives of the Philippines ===
District created February 2, 1987 from Davao del Norte's at-large district.
1		Baltazar A. Sator	June 30, 1987	June 30, 1998	8th	PDP–Laban	Elected in 1987.	1987–1998; Asuncion, Capalong, Mabini, Maco, New Corella, Pantukan, San Vicente, Tagum
1		Baltazar A. Sator	June 30, 1987	June 30, 1998	9th	Lakas	Re-elected in 1992.	1987–1998; Asuncion, Capalong, Mabini, Maco, New Corella, Pantukan, San Vicente, Tagum
1		Baltazar A. Sator	June 30, 1987	June 30, 1998	10th	Lakas	Re-elected in 1995.	1987–1998; Asuncion, Capalong, Mabini, Maco, New Corella, Pantukan, San Vicente, Tagum
2		Antonio R. Floirendo Jr.	June 30, 1998	June 30, 2007	11th	LAMMP	Elected in 1998.	1998–present Braulio E. Dujali, Carmen, Panabo, Samal, Santo Tomas
2		Antonio R. Floirendo Jr.	June 30, 1998	June 30, 2007	12th	Lakas	Re-elected in 2001.	1998–present Braulio E. Dujali, Carmen, Panabo, Samal, Santo Tomas
2		Antonio R. Floirendo Jr.	June 30, 1998	June 30, 2007	13th	Lakas	Re-elected in 2004.	1998–present Braulio E. Dujali, Carmen, Panabo, Samal, Santo Tomas
3		Antonio F. Lagdameo Jr.	June 30, 2007	June 30, 2016	14th	Lakas	Elected in 2007.	1998–present Braulio E. Dujali, Carmen, Panabo, Samal, Santo Tomas
3		Antonio F. Lagdameo Jr.	June 30, 2007	June 30, 2016	15th	NUP	Re-elected in 2010.	1998–present Braulio E. Dujali, Carmen, Panabo, Samal, Santo Tomas
3		Antonio F. Lagdameo Jr.	June 30, 2007	June 30, 2016	16th	NUP	Re-elected in 2013.	1998–present Braulio E. Dujali, Carmen, Panabo, Samal, Santo Tomas
(2)		Antonio R. Floirendo Jr.	June 30, 2016	June 30, 2019	17th	Kusog Baryohanon	Elected in 2016.	1998–present Braulio E. Dujali, Carmen, Panabo, Samal, Santo Tomas
(2)		Antonio R. Floirendo Jr.	June 30, 2016	June 30, 2019	17th	HNP	Elected in 2016.	1998–present Braulio E. Dujali, Carmen, Panabo, Samal, Santo Tomas
4		Alan R. Dujali	June 30, 2019	June 30, 2025	18th	PDP–Laban	Elected in 2019.	1998–present Braulio E. Dujali, Carmen, Panabo, Samal, Santo Tomas
4		Alan R. Dujali	June 30, 2019	June 30, 2025	19th	HNP	Re-elected in 2022.	1998–present Braulio E. Dujali, Carmen, Panabo, Samal, Santo Tomas
4		Alan R. Dujali	June 30, 2019	June 30, 2025	19th	Lakas–CMD	Re-elected in 2022.	1998–present Braulio E. Dujali, Carmen, Panabo, Samal, Santo Tomas
5		Jose Manuel Lagdameo	June 30, 2025	Incumbent	20th	PFP	Elected in 2025.	1998–present Braulio E. Dujali, Carmen, Panabo, Samal, Santo Tomas

== Election results ==
=== 2025 ===
Candidate	Party	Votes	%
JM Lagdameo	Partido Federal ng Pilipinas	154,306	57.90
Rico Peligro	Independent	71,554	26.85
Ana Teresa Dujali	Independent	37,959	14.24
Randy Santa Maria	Independent	2,707	1.02
Total		266,526	100.00
Registered voters/turnout		369,996	–
Partido Federal ng Pilipinas gain from Lakas–CMD			
Source: Commission on Elections

=== 2022 ===
2022 Philippine House of Representatives elections in the 2nd District of Davao del Norte
Party	Candidate	Votes	%
Hugpong	Alan "Aldu" Dujali (incumbent)	166,750	
Reporma	Janris Jay Relampagos	97,987	
Total votes			100.00
Hugpong hold			

=== 2019 ===
2019 Philippine House of Representatives elections in the 2nd District of Davao del Norte
Party	Candidate	Votes	%
PDP–Laban	Alan "Aldu" Dujali	125,942	
Hugpong	Antonio Floirendo Jr. (incumbent)	93,035	
Independent	Rico Peligro	2,293	
Total votes			100.00
PDP–Laban gain from Hugpong			

=== 2016 ===
2016 Philippine House of Representatives election in Davao del Norte's 2nd District
Party	Candidate	Votes	%
Kusog Baryohanon	Antonio Floirendo, Jr.	170,832	100
Total votes		170,832	100
Kusog Baryohanon gain from NUP			

== See also ==
- Legislative districts of Davao del Norte
