= Nelson Dayanghirang Sr. =

Filipino politician (born 1966)

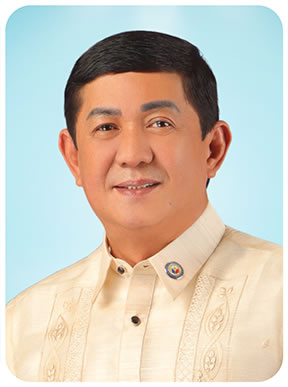
- Official portrait, 2022

10th Governor of Davao Oriental
- Incumbent
- Assumed office June 30, 2025
- Vice Governor: Glenda Rabat-Gayta
- Preceded by: Niño Sotero L. Uy Jr.
- In office June 30, 2016 – June 30, 2022
- Vice Governor: Niño Sotero L. Uy Jr.
- Preceded by: Corazon Malanyaon
- Succeeded by: Corazon Malanyaon

Member of the Philippine House of Representatives from Davao Oriental's 1st district
- In office June 30, 2022 – June 30, 2025
- Preceded by: Corazon Malanyaon
- Succeeded by: Nelson Dayanghirang Jr.
- In office June 30, 2007 – June 30, 2016
- Preceded by: Corazon Malanyaon
- Succeeded by: Corazon Malanyaon

Personal details
- Born: January 24, 1966 (age 60) Manay, Davao, Philippines
- Party: Nacionalista (2007–2015; 2018–present)
- Other political affiliations: HNP (2018–2022); Liberal (2015–2018); KAMPI (2007–2008)
- Spouse: Nanette Restor-Dayanghirang
- Children: Nelson Dayanghirang Jr. Jossone Michael Dayanghirang; Therese Nicole Dayanghirang; Camille Joyce Dayanghirang- Chiu; Tiffany Ann Dayanghirang- Cabañog

Nelson "Boy" Lechoncito Dayanghirang Sr. (born January 24, 1966) is a Filipino politician who served as the representative of Davao Oriental's 1st district from 2022 to 2025 and previously from 2007 to 2016. and serving as the governor of Davao Oriental since 2025 and previously from 2016 to 2022.
