= De Carlo Uy =

Filipino politician and businessman (born 1985)

De Carlo L. Uy
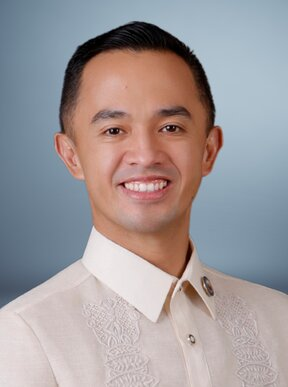
- Official portrait, 2025

Member of the Philippine House of Representatives from Davao del Norte's 1st congressional district
- Incumbent
- Assumed office June 30, 2025
- Preceded by: Pantaleon Alvarez

Vice Governor of Davao del Norte
- In office June 30, 2022 – June 30, 2025
- Governor: Edwin Jubahib
- Preceded by: Rey Uy
- Succeeded by: Clarice Jubahib

Acting Governor of Davao del Norte
- In office April 11, 2024 – July 8, 2024
- Preceded by: Edwin Jubahib
- Succeeded by: Edwin Jubahib

Member of the Tagum City Council
- In office June 30, 2007 – June 30, 2013

Personal details
- Born: De Carlo Lim Uy; January 12, 1985 (age 41) Philippines
- Party: Lakas (2007–2009; 2024–present)
- Other political affiliations: HNP (2018–2024); Liberal (2009–2018)
- Occupation: Politician, businessman
- Known for: Davao Metro Shuttle Corporation executive
- Nickname: Oyo

De Carlo "Oyo" Lim Uy (born January 12, 1985) is a Filipino politician and businessman currently serving as the Representative of Davao del Norte's 1st congressional district. He assumed office on June 30, 2025. He previously served as the Vice Governor of Davao del Norte from 2022 to 2025 and as Acting Governor of Davao del Norte from April 11 to July 8, 2024, during the preventive suspension of Governor Edwin Jubahib.

Uy supported the second impeachment of Vice President Sara Duterte in 2026, and was one of five congressmen from Davao Region to vote in favor of impeachment.

== Early life and career ==
Uy was born on January 12, 1985. He is the son of a family involved in the transport sector, managing the Davao Metro Shuttle Corporation. Under his management, the company expanded significantly, strengthening his expertise in economic growth and transportation issues.

== Political career ==
=== Tagum City Councilor (2007–2013) ===
Uy was elected as a councilor of Tagum City in 2007 and served until 2013. He was recognized for his legislative work and was named Davao's Outstanding Councilor. His initiatives during this period emphasized urban development and infrastructure.

=== Vice Governor of Davao del Norte (2022–2025) ===
In 2022, Uy was elected as Vice Governor of Davao del Norte. In this role, he presided over the Sangguniang Panlalawigan (Provincial Board), which passed 461 resolutions and 19 ordinances in 2023, addressing socio-economic and governance issues.

=== Acting Governor of Davao del Norte (2024) ===
Uy became Acting Governor on April 11, 2024, following the 60-day suspension of Governor Edwin Jubahib. By April 15, Uy and several other Davao Region officials were removed from the Hugpong ng Pagbabago (HNP) regional party of Vice President Sara Duterte. He held the position of acting governor until July 8, 2024.

=== House of Representatives (2025–present) ===
Uy was elected as the representative of Davao del Norte's 1st district in 2025.

In May 2026, Uy voted "yes" to the second impeachment of Vice President Sara Duterte, becoming one of five representatives from Davao Region to vote in favor of impeachment.
