= Davao Oriental's 1st congressional district =

Legislative district of the Philippines

- Constituency for the House of Representatives of the Philippines
- Location of Davao Oriental within the Philippines
- Province: Davao Oriental
- Region: Davao Region
- Population: 223,811 (2020)
- Electorate: 154,514 (2022)
- Major settlements: 6 LGUs: Municipalities; Baganga; Boston; Caraga; Cateel; Manay; Tarragona
- Area: 3,209.91 km^{2} (1,239.35 sq mi)

Current constituency
- Created: 1987
- Representative: Nelson Dayanghirang Jr.
- Political party: Lakas–CMD
- Congressional bloc: Majority

Davao Oriental's 1st congressional district is one of the two congressional districts of the Philippines in the province of Davao Oriental. It has been represented in the House of Representatives since 1987. The district covers the northern municipalities of Baganga, Boston, Caraga, Cateel, Manay and Tarragona. It is currently represented in the 20th Congress by Nelson Dayanghirang Jr. of the Lakas–CMD (Lakas).

== Representation history ==
#	Image	Member	Term of office		Congress	Party	Electoral history	Constituent LGUs
#	Image	Member	Start	End	Congress	Party	Electoral history	Constituent LGUs
=== Davao Oriental's 1st district for the House of Representatives of the Philippines ===
District created February 2, 1987. Redistricted from Davao Oriental's at-large district.
1		Enrico G. Dayanghirang	June 30, 1987	June 30, 1992	8th	PDP–Laban	Elected in 1987.	1987–present Baganga, Boston, Caraga, Cateel, Manay, Tarragona
2		Maria Elena Palma Gil	June 30, 1992	June 30, 2001	9th	NPC	Elected in 1992.	1987–present Baganga, Boston, Caraga, Cateel, Manay, Tarragona
2		Maria Elena Palma Gil	June 30, 1992	June 30, 2001	10th	Lakas	Re-elected in 1995.	1987–present Baganga, Boston, Caraga, Cateel, Manay, Tarragona
2		Maria Elena Palma Gil	June 30, 1992	June 30, 2001	11th	Lakas	Re-elected in 1998.	1987–present Baganga, Boston, Caraga, Cateel, Manay, Tarragona
3		Corazon Nuñez Malanyaon	June 30, 2001	June 30, 2007	12th	NPC	Elected in 2001.	1987–present Baganga, Boston, Caraga, Cateel, Manay, Tarragona
3		Corazon Nuñez Malanyaon	June 30, 2001	June 30, 2007	13th	KAMPI	Re-elected in 2004.	1987–present Baganga, Boston, Caraga, Cateel, Manay, Tarragona
4		Nelson Dayanghirang	June 30, 2007	June 30, 2016	14th	Nacionalista	Elected in 2007.	1987–present Baganga, Boston, Caraga, Cateel, Manay, Tarragona
4		Nelson Dayanghirang	June 30, 2007	June 30, 2016	15th	Nacionalista	Re-elected in 2010.	1987–present Baganga, Boston, Caraga, Cateel, Manay, Tarragona
4		Nelson Dayanghirang	June 30, 2007	June 30, 2016	16th	Liberal	Re-elected in 2013.	1987–present Baganga, Boston, Caraga, Cateel, Manay, Tarragona
(3)		Corazon Nuñez Malanyaon	June 30, 2016	June 30, 2022	17th	Nacionalista	Elected in 2016.	1987–present Baganga, Boston, Caraga, Cateel, Manay, Tarragona
(3)		Corazon Nuñez Malanyaon	June 30, 2016	June 30, 2022	18th	Nacionalista	Re-elected in 2019.	1987–present Baganga, Boston, Caraga, Cateel, Manay, Tarragona
(4)		Nelson Dayanghirang	June 30, 2022	June 30, 2025	19th	Nacionalista	Elected in 2022.	1987–present Baganga, Boston, Caraga, Cateel, Manay, Tarragona
5		Nelson Dayanghirang, Jr.	June 30, 2025	Incumbent	20th	Lakas	Elected in 2025.	1987–present Baganga, Boston, Caraga, Cateel, Manay, Tarragona

== Election results ==
=== 2025 ===
Candidate	Party	Votes	%
Nelson Dayanghirang Jr.	Lakas–CMD	89,269	61.70
Pepot Lara	Partido Federal ng Pilipinas	55,424	38.30
Total		144,693	100.00
Valid votes		144,693	94.88
Invalid/blank votes		7,807	5.12
Total votes		152,500	100.00
Registered voters/turnout		174,878	87.20
Lakas–CMD gain from Nacionalista Party			
Source: Commission on Elections

=== 2022 ===
2022 Philippine House of Representatives elections
Party	Candidate	Votes	%
Nacionalista	Nelson Dayanghirang	95,035	100.00
Nacionalista hold			

== See also ==
- Legislative districts of Davao Oriental
