= Governor of Davao del Norte =

Local chief executive

Provincial Governor of Davao del Norte
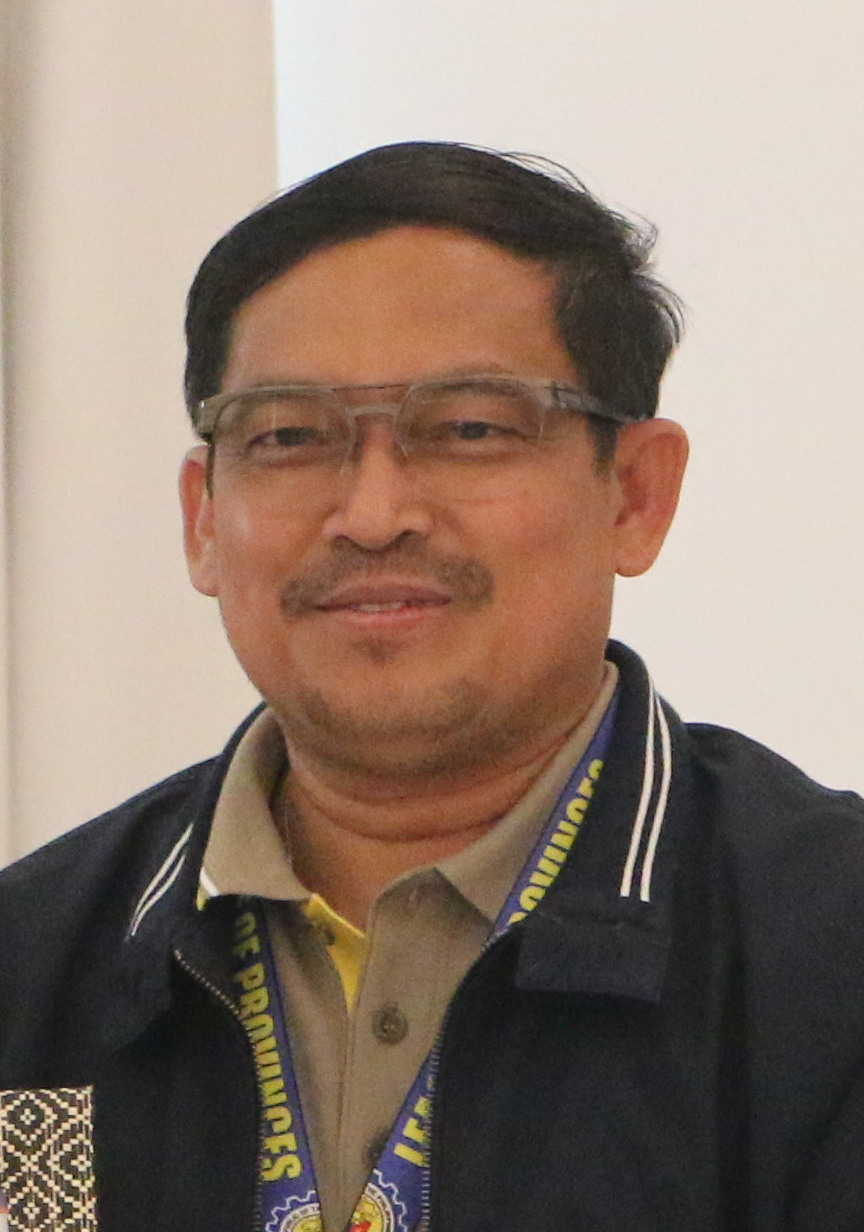
- Incumbent; Edwin I. Jubahib since June 30, 2019 (Suspended: April 8, 2024 – July 8, 2024)
- Appointer: Elected via popular vote
- Term length: 3 years, maximum of 3 consecutive terms with additional non-consecutive terms
- Inaugural holder: Verulo Boiser
- Formation: 1967

The Governor of Davao del Norte (Filipino: Punong Panlalawigan ng Davao del Norte), is the chief executive of the provincial government of Davao del Norte.

== List of governors ==
No.	Image	Governor	Term
1		Verulo Boiser	1967–1977
2		Gregorio Dujali	1977–1986
3		Prospero Amatong	March 25, 1986 – November 30, 1987
4		Romeo Jardinico	November 30, 1987 – December 14, 1987
5		Jesus Albacite	1987–1988
6		Cecilia de la Paz	1988
(3)		Prospero Amatong	February 2, 1988 – March 8, 1998
7		Aniceto Solis	March 8, 1998 – June 30, 1998
8		Rodolfo del Rosario	June 30, 1998 – June 30, 2004
9		Gelacio Gementiza	June 30, 2004 – June 30, 2007
(8)		Rodolfo del Rosario	June 30, 2007 – June 30, 2016
10		Antonio Rafael del Rosario	June 30, 2016 – June 30, 2019
11		Edwin Jubahib (Note: The national government imposed a 60-day preventive suspension dated April 8 on Jubahib due to strong evidence of "grave abuse of authority and oppression charges". Jubahib defied the order and has refused to vacate the provincial capitol.)	June 30, 2019 – Present
–		De Carlo Uy (Note: Uy as vice governor serves as an acting governor while Jubahib serves his 60-day preventive suspension effective April 11, 2024.)	April 11, 2024 – July 8, 2024
