= Davao City Bypass Road =

Road in the Philippines

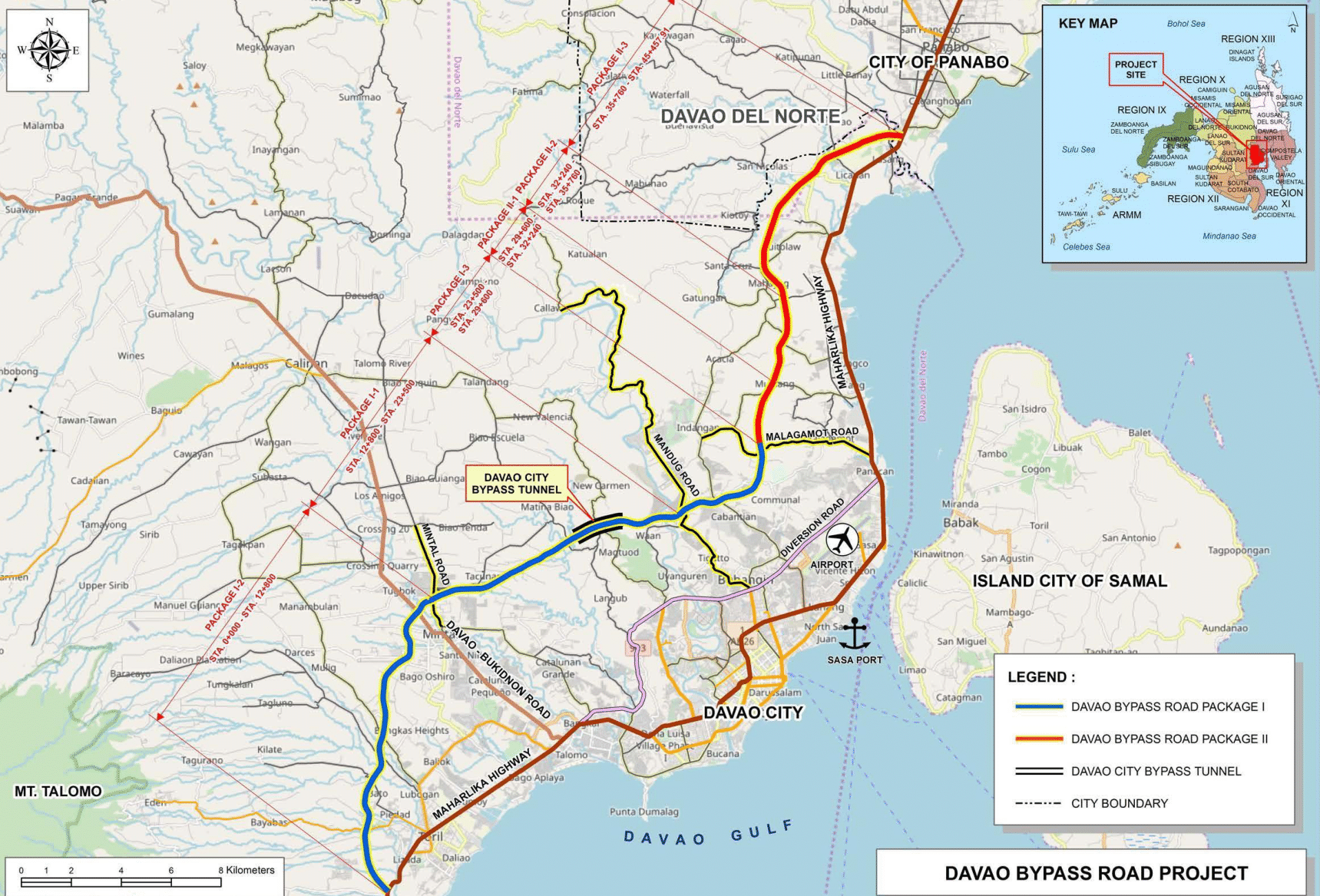

Route information
- Maintained by Department of Public Works and Highways
- Length: 45.5 km (28.3 mi)

Major junctions
- North end: AH26 (McArthur Highway) in Toril, Davao City
- South end: AH26 (Davao-Agusan National Highway) in J.P. Laurel, Panabo City

Location
- Country: Philippines
- Provinces: Davao del Sur, Davao del Norte
- Major cities: Davao City, Panabo City

Highway system
- Roads in the Philippines; Highways; Expressways; List

Davao City Bypass Road is a 45.5-kilometer bypass road project–from Barangay Sirawan in Toril, Davao City to Barangay J.P. Laurel in Panabo City, Philippines. It aims to cut the travel time through both cities from 1 hour and 44 minutes to 49 minutes. Its objective is to improve the transport logistics and mitigate congestion in Davao City, thereby contributing to economic and social development in Mindanao.

It had an estimated total cost of ₱46.80 billion, which was updated to ₱70.8 billion. The construction supervision of the project is headed by a joint venture of Nippon Koei Co., Ltd., Katahira and Engineers International, Nippon Engineering Consultants Co., Ltd. in association with the Philkoei International, Inc.

== History ==
In 2015, the Japan International Cooperation Agency (JICA) signed Japanese ODA loan agreements with the Government of the Republic of the Philippines under the second Aquino administration to provide loans of up to a total of ¥33.689 billion for Metro Manila Priority Bridges Seismic Improvement Project and Davao City Bypass Construction Project (South and Center Sections).

Actual work on the project began in 2017, under the Duterte administration.

On June 16, 2020, the Philippines and Japan signed the loan agreement for the supplemental financing of ₱18.5 billion (¥35 billion) for the project.

On November 19, 2021, DPWH Secretary Roger Mercado and Japanese Ambassador Kazuhiko Koshikawa led in witnessing the start of tunnel boring activity for the 2.3-kilometer (1.4 mi) twin tunnels of the project. It is slated as the country's first long-distance mountain tunnel.

In 2024, a supplemental loan of ₱14 billion was approved by the National Economic and Development Authority (NEDA) Board headed by the Marcos Jr. administration. This sums up the total amount of project to ₱70.8 billion.

In 2025, the mountain tunnel component was finished with the Davao City Bypass Tunnel becoming the longest road tunnel in the Philippines. The tunnel for northbound traffic was fully excavacated by March 14, 2025 and had its breakthrough ceremony on April 28, 2025.

== Project phases and progress ==
The whole project will be divided into two phases with each divided into sub-phases. These are subject to revisions and changes as the project is still being implemented.

Phase I (funded by a loan agreement between the Government of the Philippines and JICA)

- I-1 (10.7 km or 6.6 mi) four (4)-lane highway inclusive of 2.3 kilometer twin road tunnel. (Joint venture group of Shimizu Corporation, Ulticon Builders, and Takenaka Corporation)
- I-2 (12.8 km or 8.0 mi) four (4)-lane highway has its contract agreement for the civil works underway.
- I-3 (5.6 km or 3.5 mi) four (4)-lane road with one (1) bridge, two (2) cut and cover tunnels, twelve (12) culverts, and one (1) overpass.

Phase II (funded by the General Appropriations Act, is subdivided into three contract packages)

- II-1 (1.28 km or 0.80 mi) four (4)-lane road and (7) seven bridges. (Joint venture group of Cavite Ideal International Construction and Development Corporation, Wee Eng Construction Incorporation, and Coastland Construction and Development Corporation)
- II-2 (3.52 km or 2.19 mi) (Consortium of AIMM Builder & Construction Supply, Nationstar Development Corporation, and China Road and Bridge Corporation.)
- II-3 (9.7 km or 6.0 mi) scheduled for procurement this third quarter of 2024.

== Toll and Management ==
The project is categorized as a high-standard highway (HSH), with a management structure designed to support the country's first long-distance mountain tunnel. Under JICA's operational framework, the project utilizes a phased tolling and Public-Private Partnership (PPP) model.

=== O&M and PPP Scheme ===
To ensure technical sustainability, the operation and maintenance (O&M) of the bypass is planned to be outsourced to private companies via a PPP or specialized O&M contract. The tolling strategy is structured in two primary phases:

- Phase 1 (2027): Tolling will be implemented exclusively for the mountain tunnel section to fund specialized technical maintenance.
- Phase 2 (2028): The tolled zone will be extended to include the excavated tunnel sections.

The DPWH Region XI and its district offices will handle the maintenance and management of the bypass's free surface roads during this starting period.

=== Tunnel O&M Facilities ===
The specialized nature of the 2.3-kilometer twin-tube tunnel requires dedicated infrastructure for safety and emergency management, including:

- Operations Centers: 24/7 monitoring hubs located at the tunnel portals to oversee traffic and environmental conditions.
- Safety Systems: Management of SCADA (Supervisory Control and Data Acquisition) systems, high-capacity jet fans for smoke extraction, and emergency cross-passages for vehicle and pedestrian evacuation.
- Technical Training: A JICA-funded technical cooperation project (2025–2028) aims to strengthen the DPWH's capacity in tunnel O&M, ensuring standardized inspection and emergency response protocols.
