= Maryknoll College of Panabo =

Roman Catholic school in Davao del Norte, Philippines

Maryknoll College of Panabo, Inc.

Location
- National Highway Cor. Tadeco Road, Panabo City, Davao del Norte; Panabo; Philippines; 7°18′29″N 125°41′06″E

Information
- Religious affiliation: Roman Catholic
- Established: 1960
- Principal: Rev. Fr. Emerson B. Delos Reyes, Ed.D.
- Website: https://www.mcpi.edu.ph

The Maryknoll College of Panabo, Inc. (MCPI) is a private, Catholic school in the city of Panabo, Davao del Norte. The school was associated by the Maryknoll Congregation also called the Maryknoll Sisters. Previously Dominican, the current patron of the institution is St. John Vianney. The school is the largest private school in the city of Panabo in terms of enrollments.

== History ==
=== Beginning (1960-1961) ===
A group of American Maryknoll Sisters, headed by Sister Mary Rhoda, founded the school in 1960. Sister Rhoda, who also acted as its principal, named it St. Mary’s High School. It started with four classrooms only, accommodating 60 students. Through the generous donations of her friends abroad, she was able to put up a two-story building housing four classrooms, a library, a science laboratory, offices and the Sisters’ Convent at the second floor. The side fronting the highway was converted into a stage used for the flag ceremonies and other programs.

Two years later, Sister Rhoda, was transferred to another place, replaced by Sister Mary Concepcion. This time, the enrollment had already reached the 200 mark. In succeeding two years, the student population had gone up to 350. With this enrollment growth, additional classrooms had to be constructed to accommodate more students this eventually gave way to the completion of the four year high school course.

=== Change of name (1965-1966) ===
On April 3, 1965 the school had been renamed Maryknoll High School of Panabo, apparently in honor of its founding Maryknoll Sisters, allowed under the provisions of the Corporation Code, Republic Act 1459. Its mother school in Quezon City, Maryknoll (now Miriam) College had inspired the adoption of the new name. Sister Corde Maria acted as its new principal, continuing the services and leadership of the Maryknoll Sisters for the next five years.

Sister Corde presided over the expansion and progress of the school, as more classrooms and facilities had to be put up. It was during the time that the school earned a distinction of being the leading educational institution in Panabo, known for its good academic instruction, firm discipline and sense of Christian values and leadership. There were two other principals who came after Sister Corde Maria.

=== Transition (1974-1975) ===
Believing that the school could already stand even without them and in order to answer more missionary calls, the Maryknoll Sisters turned over the management of the school to lay people. Pio J. Galagala was the first and only layperson to be appointed principal. Improvement of the school’s instruction and facilities had been his priority considering the increase of enrollment. In school year 1976-1977, the last term of his office, there were 599 students enrolled.

=== Return to the Religious' Hand (1977-1978) ===
In 1977, the school was hand back to a religious order; the Daughter of the Assumption, Sister Maria Aurelia Berdenas, FMA was the principal whose leadership made possible the erection of annex, five classroom building to 1978. A year after a new canteen connecting the main building was built to accommodate 858 students. The science laboratory was renovated and additional textbook and library references were provided.

=== Turnover to the Dominican Order (1980-1981) ===
The sister of the Assumption gave the management of the school for some reasons and the bishop of Tagum decided to tap the services of the Dominican Sisters of the Most Holy Rosary of the Philippines to handle the school. The first Dominican sister to become principal was Sister Maria Virgilia Rivero, O.P.. During her term the old building, library, laboratory, faculty room, and classrooms were renovated. A mini-auditorium and faculty dormitory were constructed and the school fence. More textbook were acquired to deal with the students numbering to around 1,000. In 1981, kindergarten classes were also opened as an initial step towards the creation of an elementary department.

=== Present (2011 onwards) ===
The school has undertaken the following endeavors to improve its five major key areas of management and development to measure up to the standards of total quality management, monitoring, and evaluation.

Today the school has plenty of buildings and teachers. It now has a gymnasium for entertainment, sports and recognition purposes. The second three-storey building is situated in front of the Gaisano Grand Panabo and behind the city's market. The six-storey building is situated on the left side from the entrance of the school which is being occupied by the Senior High School students.

== Notable alumni ==
- Thor Dulay, Filipino singer and The Voice Philippines semifinalist.
- Jasmine B. Lee, Philippine-Born Korean proportional representative of the South Korean National Assembly.
- Darwin Sauler, or "Darla" is a writer, known for Gandang Gabi Vice (2011), The Legal Wife (2014) and Kris TV.
