= Seal of Panabo =

Circle containing the coat of arms of the Philippine capital

- Armiger: City of Panabo
- Adopted: 2001 (Present seal)
- Motto: Lungsod Ng Panabo
- Earlier version(s): 1980s, 1990s
- Use: Meaning of Panabo Seal: building, shield, arrow, house, family, rocks, agriculture, marine, products, hands, ship, rope and green background

The Seal of Panabo is one of the official symbols of the city of Panabo, in the province of Davao del Norte, Philippines.

== Historical seals ==
(1980s - 1990s) The First Municipality of Panabo Seal. (Yellow Era).

(1990s - 2001) The Secondary Municipal Seal of Panabo (Municipal Green Era).

Yellow Era (1980s – 1990s)

In the 1980s, Municipality of Panabo had its own seal which is described as an outline yellow color with a cross. The symbols depicted were three yellowed corns, green bananas, three brown coconuts and three bubbly fish (possibly bangus or milkfish). The year establishing the Yellow Era Panabo Municipal Seal was unknown, but it was most likely used in the 1980s, because the seal was found and based on the Mayor Hon. Jose J. Cafe (1986 – 1992) Municipal Mayor Desk. This "Yellow Era" Panabo Municipal Seal was also considered lost and obscure (just like Tagum's old previous Municipal Seal.)

Municipal Green Era (1990s – 2001)

In the 1990s, Municipality of Panabo redesigned its new and secondary seal. The color of this seal was green. The English writing was changed to Filipino where the caption was changed from "Municipality of Panabo" to "Bayan Ng Panabo". At the bottom of this seal, where it was written "Official Seal" the words became "Lalawigan Ng Dabaw (Province of Davao, which was now Province of Davao Del Norte.)" The symbols on this seal lack details. It symbolizes as a shield with a green triangle shape inside. The triangle has three sides where the yellow background upward side has a symbol of a tree. The white background leftward symbolizes corn, pineapple and a possibly green color wheat. And lastly, a brown colored background positioned rightwards has symbols of three bangus fish. It was possibly used in the 1990s until its achievement into cityhood in 2001.

== Description ==
Current Cityhood of Panabo Seal (2001 – Present)

Building: represents the industrial infrastructure development of the city.

Shield and arrow: tells the story of the name 'Panabo' was coined. "Pana" and "Bo" means bow and arrow which was used by the first settlers for their survival. It also represents learning institutions which the city aims to provide a chance of free education to all Panaboans.

House: represents the basic unit of community and its role in the society. It also symbolizes the city government's aim to provide shelter for each family.

Family: represents a strong and unified family for a strong and united country.

Rocks: represent a firm foundation for each family.

Agriculture and marine products: represents the products found within the boundaries in Panabo. Placed in a shaped-like figure above a "blue wave" symbolizes its export potentials.

Hands: symbolize the hallowed hands of the "Supreme Being", who blessed Panabo with all its abundance and progress. It also represents the untiring support of the local and national government officials for the development of the city.

Ship: represents the economic contribution of the coastal activities especially in the exportation of goods.

Rope: the rope that surrounds the seal represents both the people and the local government officials who bind themselves in unity to help Panaboans realize their dreams.

Green color background: represents the lean and green Panabo. It will also be a reminder for the people to maintain the beauty of the place, not just for now but for the future.

And the basis on this seal is in the website City Government of Panabo.
