= Converge Vision =

Philippines IPTV service provider

Converge Vision (Sky TV, Converge FiberTV)
- Industry: Telecommunications (brand)
- Predecessors: Converge Freedom (2019–2021)
- Founded: July 28, 2021; 4 years ago
- Headquarters: Pasig, Philippines
- Area served: SkyTV: Metro Manila; FiberTV: Selected provincial areas
- Products: Internet Protocol television
- Owner: Pacific Kabelnet; Converge ICT (co-affiliate)
- Website: www.mysky.com.ph/skytv

Converge Vision, separately marketed as Sky TV (for Metro Manila) and Converge FiberTV (for select areas in key provinces), is a digital Internet Protocol television (IPTV) service provider in the Philippines. Launched in 2021, Vision is owned by Pacific Kabelnet Holdings and co-partners with affiliate Converge ICT.

== History ==
In 2019, Converge first launched Freedom, an add-on streaming service offering cable channels for its FiberX subscribers in Metro Manila and Luzon.

On July 28, 2021, Converge officially launched Vision, a new IPTV platform offering cable channels using its fiber broadband internet connection. Like its predecessor Freedom, the service is initially an add-on option to Converge's FiberX subscription at a separated monthly price.

In 2024, months after signing a partnership for utilization of Sky's fiber broadband infrastructure, Sky Cable and Converge jointly launched Sky TV, a separate service using the Vision/FiberTV model. In the middle part of 2025, Converge began integrating both Vision and FiberTV services into Sky TV, leaving the latter as the official marketing brand but still owned by Converge.
