= Dennis Anthony Uy =

Filipino businessman

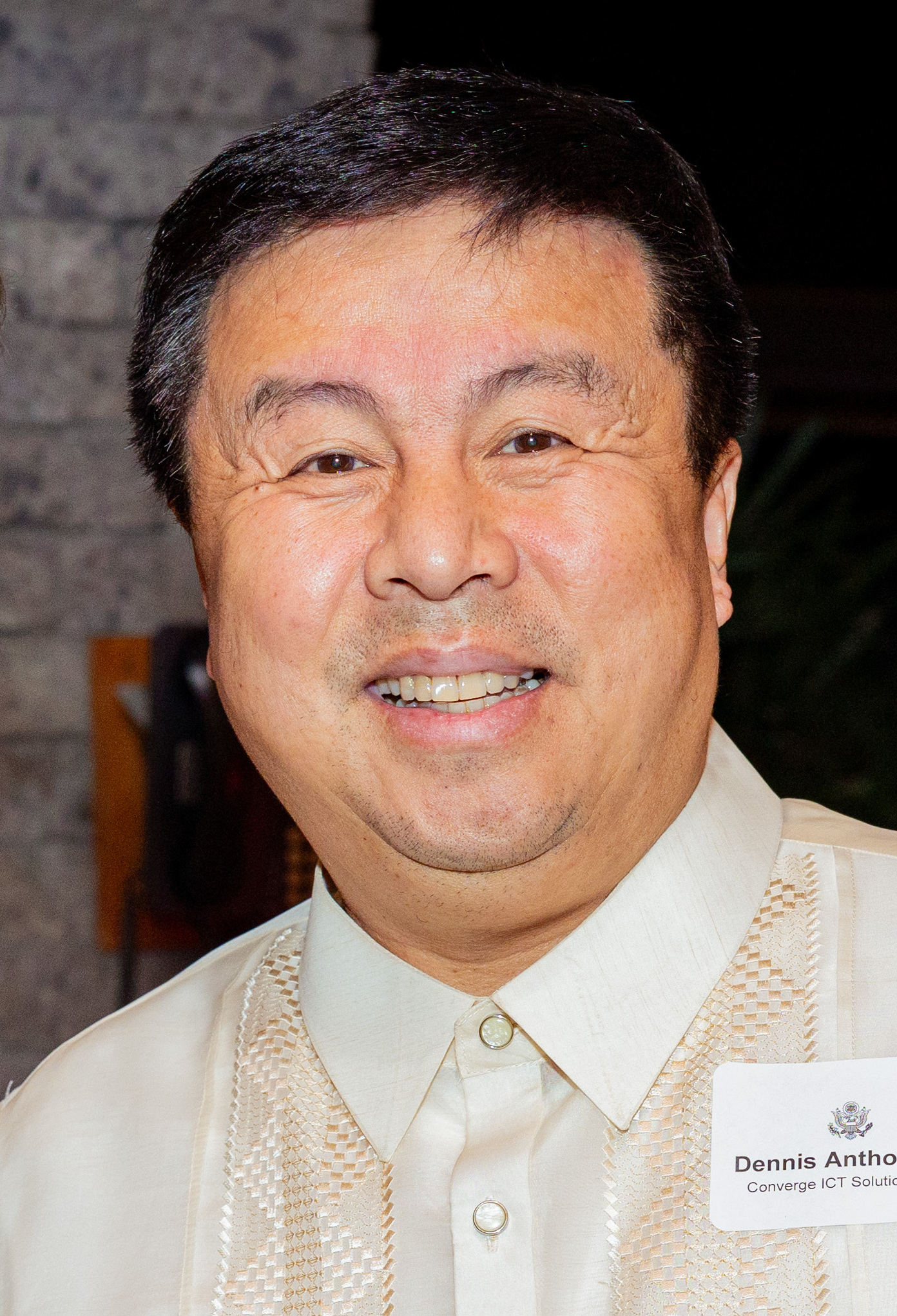
- Uy in 2023
- Born: June 1, 1966 (age 60); Fukien, China
- Education: Holy Angel University
- Occupation: Businessman
- Known for: Founder and owner of Converge ICT
- Spouse: Maria Grace Yao

Dennis Anthony H. Uy is a Filipino businessman who is known for being the founder of Converge ICT.

== Early life and education ==
Dennis Anthony Uy was born on June 1, 1966, in Fukien (now Fujian), China. In China, the Uys lived in poverty with one meal a day already considered "a blessing". When he moved in, he could not speak English nor Tagalog. Dennis Uy and his family emigrated to the Philippines in 1977 with the help of his uncle Johnny Uy. At age 11, Uy worked as a cold storage handyman at Johnny's Supermarket, which was considered as the oldest supermarket in Angeles City and was run by his uncle.

The younger Uy spent his studies in Angeles City, attending Chevalier School for his high school studies and the Holy Angel University where he graduated with a degree in electrical engineering in 1992.

== Career ==
As a high school student, Uy sold Betamax and VHS tapes he sourced from Greenhills in San Juan, Metro Manila which later led to him setting up Jack's Video, a Betamax and VHS rental service with his brother in Angeles City. Uy would stop his Betamax and VHS business in the early 1990s as the technology was becoming obsolete. Dennis Uy later set up the Angeles City Cable and Television Network, a cable television provider which caters to Central Luzon.

He expanded to the broadband and fiber optics business founding the ComClark Network and Technology Corp. in 1996 which later became Converge ICT. He has also expressed his vision to develop Angeles City, his hometown, as a technology hub similar to Silicon Valley. Converge under his watch also pursued a bid to become the third major telecommunications provider in the Philippines in 2018 after Globe and PLDT, but lost to Dito Telecommunity associated with his namesake Dennis Ang Uy. Globe acknowledge Converge as a bigger competitor than Dito despite Converge losing the bid.

In 2021, Uy became a board member of Silicon Valley–based firm Axiado Corp. In 2023, President Bongbong Marcos appointed him as his special envoy to Korea for digital transformation. He took his oath of office on October 4, 2023.

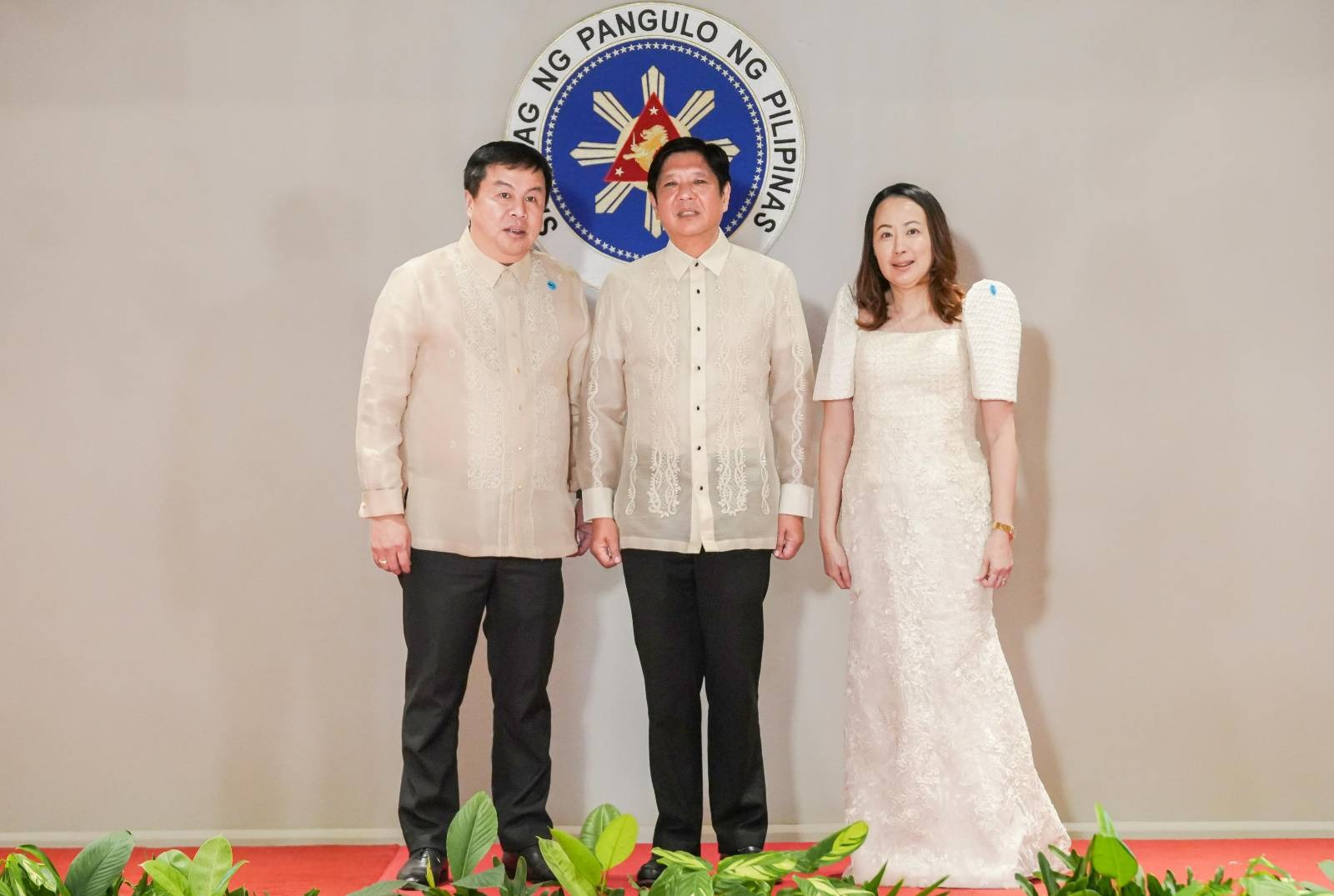
Uy and his wife pose with Marcos after taking his oath of office as special envoy.

== Personal life ==
Dennis Uy is married to Maria Grace Yao, who is also a co-founder of Converge.

== See also ==
- Alfonso Uy
- Edgar Sia
- Jonha Richman
