= DWDU =

Radio station in Pampanga, Philippines

- Angeles City; Philippines
- Broadcast area: Central Luzon and surrounding areas
- Frequency: 105.5 MHz (HD Radio)

Programming
- Format: Silent

Ownership
- Owner: Reliance Broadcasting Unlimited

History
- First air date: October 1, 2012
- Last air date: February 16, 2026
- Former names: D'Ultimate (2012–2015); UFM (2015–2024); Newsline Central Luzon (2025-2026)
- Call sign meaning: D'Ultimate (former branding)

Technical information
- Licensing authority: NTC

DWDU (105.5 FM) was a radio station owned and operated by Reliance Broadcasting Unlimited, an affiliate company of Converge ICT.

== History ==
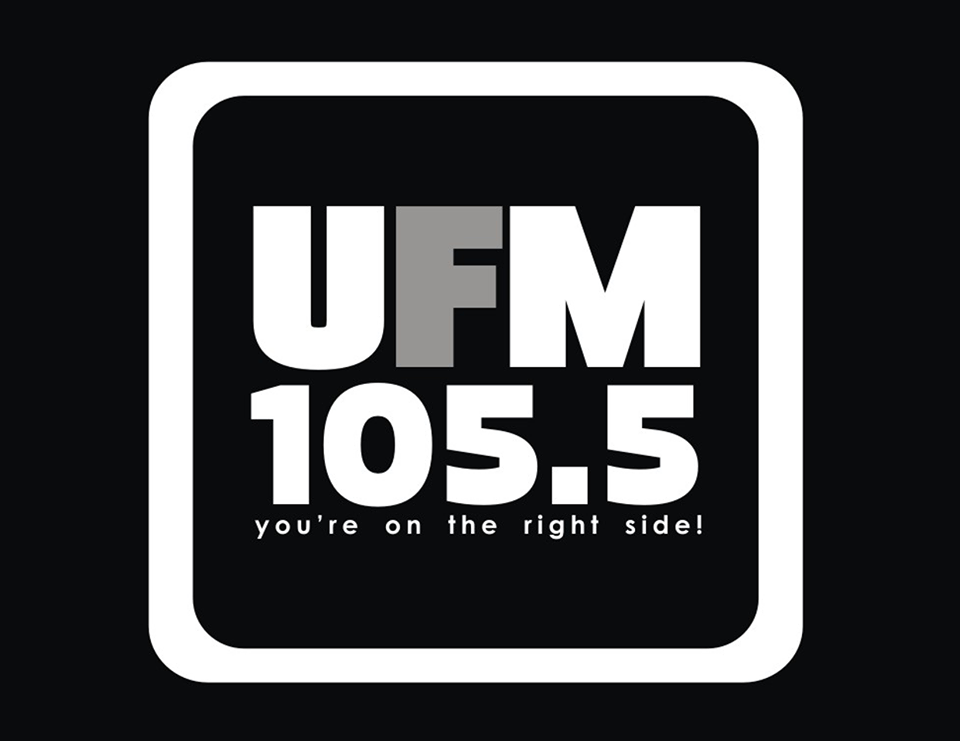
UFM 105.5 (2015-2024)

=== 2012-2015: D' Ultimate ===
DWDU-FM began operations on October 1, 2012 at the Comclark Bldg. Manuel A. Roxas Highway Clark Freeport Zone, Pampanga as D'Ultimate 105.5, with a mass-based format. The station was originally licensed under the ownership of Information Broadcast Unlimited, the current licensee of provincial television stations under UNTV 37. It served as home to some veteran local personnel such as Alvin Masangkay (John Ericsson), known for his love advice program Moments of Love.

=== 2015-2024: UFM ===
In 2015, DWDU rebranded to UFM 105.5 and switched to a Top 40 format after it was bought by Reliance Broadcasting Unlimited. In 2018, 105.5 FM changed its format to adult hits.

On April 12, 2024, UFM made its final broadcast after 12 years due to financial issues. Not long after, its Clark FM Transmitter Hill site was dismantled. Earlier in that year, UFM's sister cable TV channel Pep TV 3 also went off the air, citing similar reasons.

=== 2025-2026: Failed lease negotiations with JRS Newsline Multimedia Corporation ===
On November 3, 2025, the frequency began a series of test broadcasts carrying the feed of Newsline Central Luzon under JRS Newsline Multimedia Corporation, owned by Pampanga PIO chief Joel Mapiles. Prior to its reactivation, Newsline had initially aired test transmissions on 101.5 FM in May 2023 and transferred to 103.1 FM a month later through an airtime lease by Santiago, Isabela-based Soundstream Broadcasting Corporation under a provisional authority by the National Telecommunications Commission. Despite being legally operational in its two years of broadcast, the station had repeatedly been held back from receiving a full renewable license from the NTC.

As a part of the ongoing test broadcast and projected transition to a long-term lease, the station utilized the existing Newsline Central Luzon studio and transmission facilities in Landmark Commercial Building, Brgy. Quebiyawan, San Fernando, Pampanga. However, on February 16, 2026, Newsline transferred back to 103.1 FM after an impasse concerning Reliance Broadcasting's high airtime lease fee, leaving 105.5 FM off the air.
