= Dennis Denora =

Filipino journalist and publisher

- Born: c. 1951; Davao, Philippines
- Died: June 7, 2018 (aged 66–67); Panabo, Davao del Norte, Philippines
- Cause of death: Gunshot
- Citizenship: Philippines
- Occupation: Journalist
- Known for: Trends and Times

Dennis Denora (c. 1951 – June 7, 2018) was a Filipino journalist and publisher best known for his weekly publication Trends and Times. He lived in Davao del Norte, Philippines, where he wrote about the history, events, and issues of the province. On June 7, 2018, Denora was murdered by two motorcyclists while stuck in traffic with his driver Mayonito Revira.

== Biography ==
Denora lived in Davao del Norte, working as a columnist, broadcaster, and publisher. He had a radio program on Luzon's DXKS-FM based in Tagum City and was the founding chair of a media association based in Davao del Norte. Denora wrote about events and issues that affected the Davao del Norte province and often criticized political officials from the region.

== Death ==
=== Events ===
On June 7, 2018, Denora was riding in a white Hyundai Elantra with his driver, Mayonito Revira, on the national highway in New Pandan, Panabo City. At approximately ten past one in the afternoon, they were ambushed while in traffic by two men riding a motorcycle, who shot Denora multiple times in the head and body and Revira twice in his right hand. After the attack, Revira was able to drive approximately 300 meters to escape the assailants. Authorities later recovered three fired bullets and one fired cartridge from a caliber .45 pistol.

=== Investigation ===
Local authorities and governmental task forces investigated the murder, offering a reward of 100,000 Philippine pesos for information that could lead to an arrest. Denora's friends offered an additional 200,000 Philippine pesos for such information. A Special Investigation Task Group (SITG) called "Task Force Denora" was created to investigate the murder, consisting of a Deputy Regional Director for Operations, Provincial Director, Criminal Investigation and Detection Group, the Provincial Crime Laboratory Office, the Provincial Investigation and Detective Management Branch, and a Provincial Legal Officer. The SITG worked alongside the Presidential Task Force on Media Security (PTFOMS) in conducting the investigation, resulting in the discovery and analysis of closed circuit television footage and Denora's mobile phone. Investigators suspected the involvement of a high-level politician in Denora's murder, with several of Denora's colleagues claiming that he had been arguing with a government official shortly before his murder. Reporters questioned former Speaker of the House of Representatives Pantaleon Alvarez about the incident due to his previous lawsuit against Denora for libel. Alvarez denied any involvement in Denora's murder and claimed to be outside of the country at the time the murder occurred.

=== Aftermath ===
Denora's murder caused an increase in the amount of attention paid to motorcycle attacks in the Philippines, which have resulted in hundreds of unsolved murder cases over the past few decades. Police Chief Director General Oscar Albayalde proposed that stickers be attached to every motorcycle in the country to facilitate the identification of suspects. Colleagues of Denora advocated for a nationwide ban of tinted motorcycle helmets as well as stricter gun laws. In the wake of the deaths of Denora and several Filipino prosecutors, Presidential Spokesman Harry Roque stated that President Rodrigo Duterte was frustrated with the killings and corruption in the Philippines. Roque stated that Duterte was considering "radical changes" such as the declaration of a state of national emergency.

Filipino Congressman Antonio Floirendo Jr. said in a statement that the killing "underscored the threat media faces when exposing the evils of society, particularly the lies that some sectors peddle in order to gain public support." Floirendo Jr. went on to honor Denora as a man of "decency, integrity, and a strong commitment to seek the journalistic truth." The National Union of Journalists in the Philippines (NUJP) organized a protest during which journalists and friends of Denora lit candles in his honor. At the event, NUJP Chairperson Jo Clemente stated, "This should be the last. The list of journalists killed in the Philippines should not increase." Other journalists commented on the crime, criticizing the lack of accountability which had allowed for the murders to continue.

=== International reactions ===
Daniel Bastard, the head of Reporters without Borders' Asia Pacific desk, wrote in a statement that "the current government keeps on pointing to this task force, created in October 2016, as evidence of its desire to protect journalists but this is the 6th journalist to be murdered since Rodrigo Duterte became president. The authorities must take more concrete measures to guarantee journalists' safety."

Audrey Azoulay, the Director General of UNESCO, condemned the murder, saying that "it is essential for freedom of expression and press freedom, for democracy and rule of law, that the authorities ensure this crime does not go unpunished."

== See also ==
- Crime in the Philippines
