= Panabo =

Component city in Davao del Norte, Philippines

- Component city
- City of Panabo
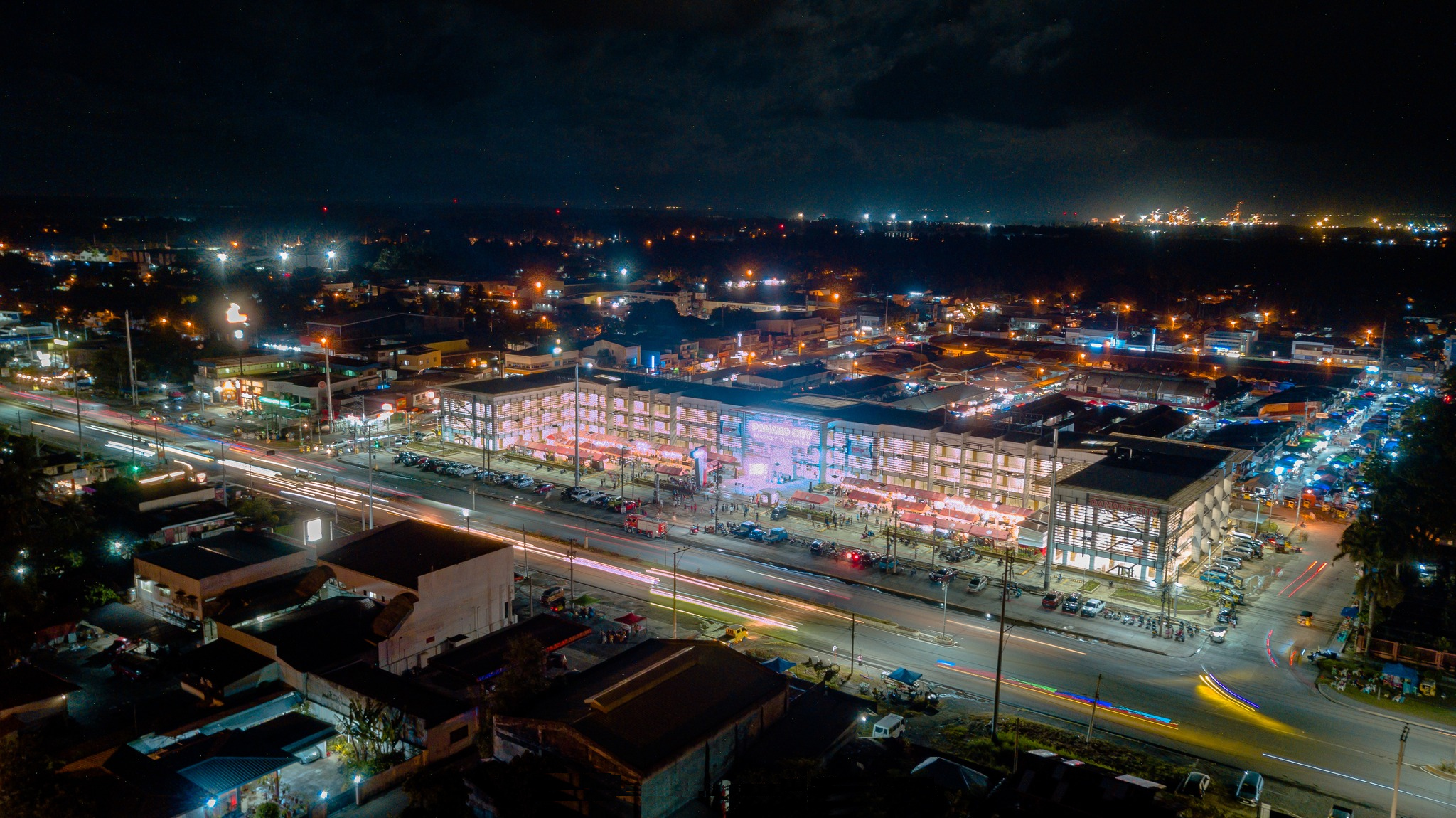
- Panabo City downtown at night with its newly established LGU-owned Market Complex

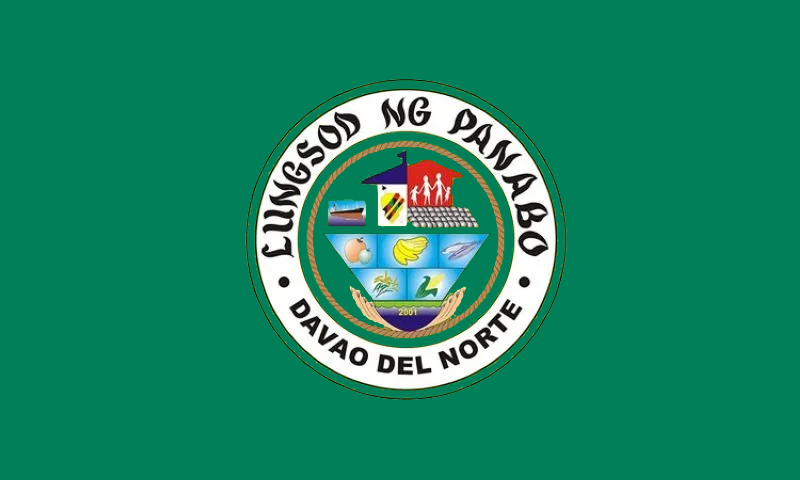
- Flag Seal
- Nickname: Banana Capital of the Philippines
- Motto: "Service to Panaboans, Service to God!"
- Anthem: Panabo Hymn
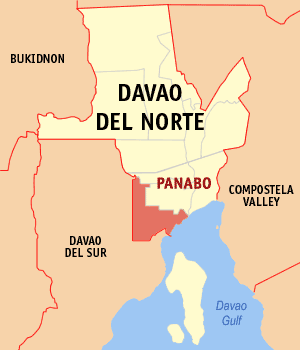
- Map of Davao del Norte with Panabo highlighted
- Interactive map of Panabo
- Location within the Philippines
- Coordinates: 7°18′05″N 125°40′51″E
- Country: Philippines
- Region: Davao Region
- Province: Davao del Norte
- District: 2nd district
- Founded: July 19, 1949
- Cityhood: March 31, 2001
- Barangays: 40 (see Barangays)

Government
  - Type: Sangguniang Panlungsod
  - City Mayor: Jose E. Relampagos (Reporma)
  - City Vice Mayor: Franklin D. Gentiles (PFP)
  - City Administrator: Pedrito A. Misoles
  - Representative: JM Lagdameo (PFP)
  - City Council: Members: Josie Mary Relampagos; Janno Paolo P. Gentiles; Jam Macla; Omar P. Ranain; Emeterio Blase; Devona Inso; Loloy Sumampong; Ian Rolet Catalan; Janet Tanong; Ronald Ang
  - Electorate: 131,807 voters (2025)

Area
  - Total: 251.23 km^{2} (97.00 sq mi)
- Elevation: 74 m (243 ft)
- Highest elevation: 555 m (1,821 ft)
- Lowest elevation: 0 m (0 ft)

Population (2024 census)
  - Total: 211,242
  - Density: 840.83/km^{2} (2,177.7/sq mi)
  - Households: 51,097
- Demonym: Panaboan

Economy
  - Income class: 1st city income class
  - Poverty incidence: 21.6% (2023)
  - Revenue: ₱ 1,932 million (2024)
  - Assets: ₱ 5,543 million (2024)
  - Expenditure: ₱ 1,348 million (2024)
  - Liabilities: ₱ 1,324 million (2024)

Service provider
  - Electricity: Davao Light and Power Company (DLPC)
  - Water: Panabo Water District (joint venture with PrimeWater)
  - Telecommunications: Converge ICT; Dito Telecommunity; Globe Telecom; PLDT
  - Cable TV: Panabo Satellite Cable Television
- Time zone: UTC+8 (PST)
- ZIP code: 8105
- PSGC: 112315000
- IDD : area code: +63 (0)84
- Native languages: Ata Manobo; Davawenyo; Cebuano; Kalagan; Tagalog
- Website: www.panabocity.gov.ph

Panabo, officially the City of Panabo (Cebuano: Dakbayan sa Panabo; Filipino: Lungsod ng Panabo), is a component city in the province of Davao del Norte, Philippines. According to the 2024 census, it has a population of 211,242 people. It is also known for being the “Banana Capital of the Philippines” for its vast banana plantations.

Panabo is the second most populous city in Davao del Norte (after Tagum) and it is also part of Davao Metropolitan Area as it shares borders with Davao City. It has an area of 25,123 hectares (62,080 acres). The Panabo City Hall is located about 2.23 kilometers from its boundary with Davao City.

== Etymology ==
The name Panabo originated from the phrase "pana-sa-boboy" where "pana" means "arrow", the tool which the original inhabitants of the place, the Aetas, use when hunting wild animals for food.

== History ==
Originally the rich lowland of what today is Panabo was inhabited by a group of natives called Aetas. These people led nomadic life and lived by hunting. With the use of their most essential tool, the bow and arrow—"pana-sa-boboy" as they call it—they hunted for food which primarily consisted of rootcrops and meat of wild boars.

Settlers and pioneers from the Visayas and Luzon started to flock the place during the early 1900s in search of a new life in the region. When the first batch of settlers arrived on the place, in what is now the urban core of the city, they found out that it was already a thriving community, and thus called it Taboan, or trading center. Feeling alienated with the massive influx of settlers in the region, the Aeta natives moved further into the hinterlands to the west, thus ensuring that the settler inhabitants become the majority of the population. The new inhabitants started to name the place as Panabo, named after the bow and arrow that the Aeta natives always carry.

Panabo, until then only a mere barangay of Tagum, then known as Magugpo during that time, became a town on July 19, 1949, through Presidential Proclamation No. 236 of the President Manuel A. Roxas.

The Tagum Agricultural Development Company, otherwise known as TADECO, was founded on December 20, 1950, in the town of Panabo. It was the birth of the world's largest Cavendish banana plantation that saw the mass employment of the locals seeking for jobs, and the start of unprecedented growth of the town as even larger throngs of Visayan migrants settled on the town eager to join the plantation's workforce. Large areas of forests were cleared to make way for the banana trees under TADECO. The town of Panabo grew both in economic terms and population as decades passed since the founding of TADECO and numerous businesses were then set up locally, until the conditions finally warranted for its conversion into a city.

=== Cityhood ===
The local government unit of Panabo was created into a component city of Davao del Norte by virtue of Republic Act No. 9015 and ratified by the residents in a plebiscite held on March 31, 2001. However, its official existence as a municipal corporation took effect on with the appointment of new set of officials.

== Geography ==
The city of Panabo has a total land area of 251.23 km^{2}. It was bordered by the shores of Davao Gulf to the east, by Davao City to its west and south, and some of the municipalities of Davao del Norte in the north. The western part of the city featured hills while the rest were flatlands.

=== Climate ===
Climate data for Panabo City
Month	Jan	Feb	Mar	Apr	May	Jun	Jul	Aug	Sep	Oct	Nov	Dec	Year
Mean daily maximum °C (°F)	29 (84)	30 (86)	30 (86)	30 (86)	31 (88)	31 (88)	30 (86)	30 (86)	30 (86)	30 (86)	30 (86)	30 (86)	30 (86)
Mean daily minimum °C (°F)	22 (72)	22 (72)	22 (72)	22 (72)	23 (73)	24 (75)	24 (75)	24 (75)	24 (75)	24 (75)	23 (73)	22 (72)	23 (73)
Average precipitation mm (inches)	98 (3.9)	86 (3.4)	91 (3.6)	83 (3.3)	133 (5.2)	158 (6.2)	111 (4.4)	101 (4.0)	94 (3.7)	117 (4.6)	131 (5.2)	94 (3.7)	1,297 (51.2)
Average rainy days	16.4	14.3	16.3	18.5	25.3	25.0	23.8	21.9	20.8	24.4	24.3	18.7	249.7
Source: Meteoblue (modeled/calculated data, not measured locally)

=== Barangays ===
Panabo is politically subdivided into 40 barangays. Each barangay consists of puroks while some have sitios.

Quezon was formerly the sitio of Cabili; it became a barrio in 1957.

- A. O. Floirendo
- Datu Abdul Dadia
- Buenavista
- Cacao
- Cagangohan
- Consolacion
- Dapco
- Gredu (Poblacion)
- J.P. Laurel
- Kasilak
- Katipunan
- Katualan
- Kauswagan
- Kiotoy
- Little Panay
- Lower Panaga (Roxas)
- Mabunao
- Maduao
- Malativas
- Manay
- Nanyo
- New Malaga (Dalisay)
- New Malitbog
- New Pandan (Poblacion)
- New Visayas
- Quezon
- Salvacion
- San Francisco (Poblacion)
- San Nicolas
- San Pedro
- San Roque
- San Vicente
- Santa Cruz
- Santo Niño (Poblacion)
- Sindaton
- Southern Davao
- Tagpore
- Tibungol
- Upper Licanan
- Waterfall

== Demographics ==
Population census of Panabo

Year	Pop.	±% p.a.
1960	42,509	—
1970	42,920	+0.10%
1975	53,015	+4.33%
1980	71,098	+6.04%
1990	110,390	+4.50%
1995	130,585	+3.20%

Year	Pop.	±% p.a.
2000	133,950	+0.55%
2007	154,329	+1.97%
2010	174,364	+4.54%
2015	184,599	+1.09%
2020	209,230	+2.67%
2024	211,242	+0.23%

Source: Philippine Statistics Authority

== Economy ==
Poverty incidence of Panabo (%)

Source: Philippine Statistics Authority

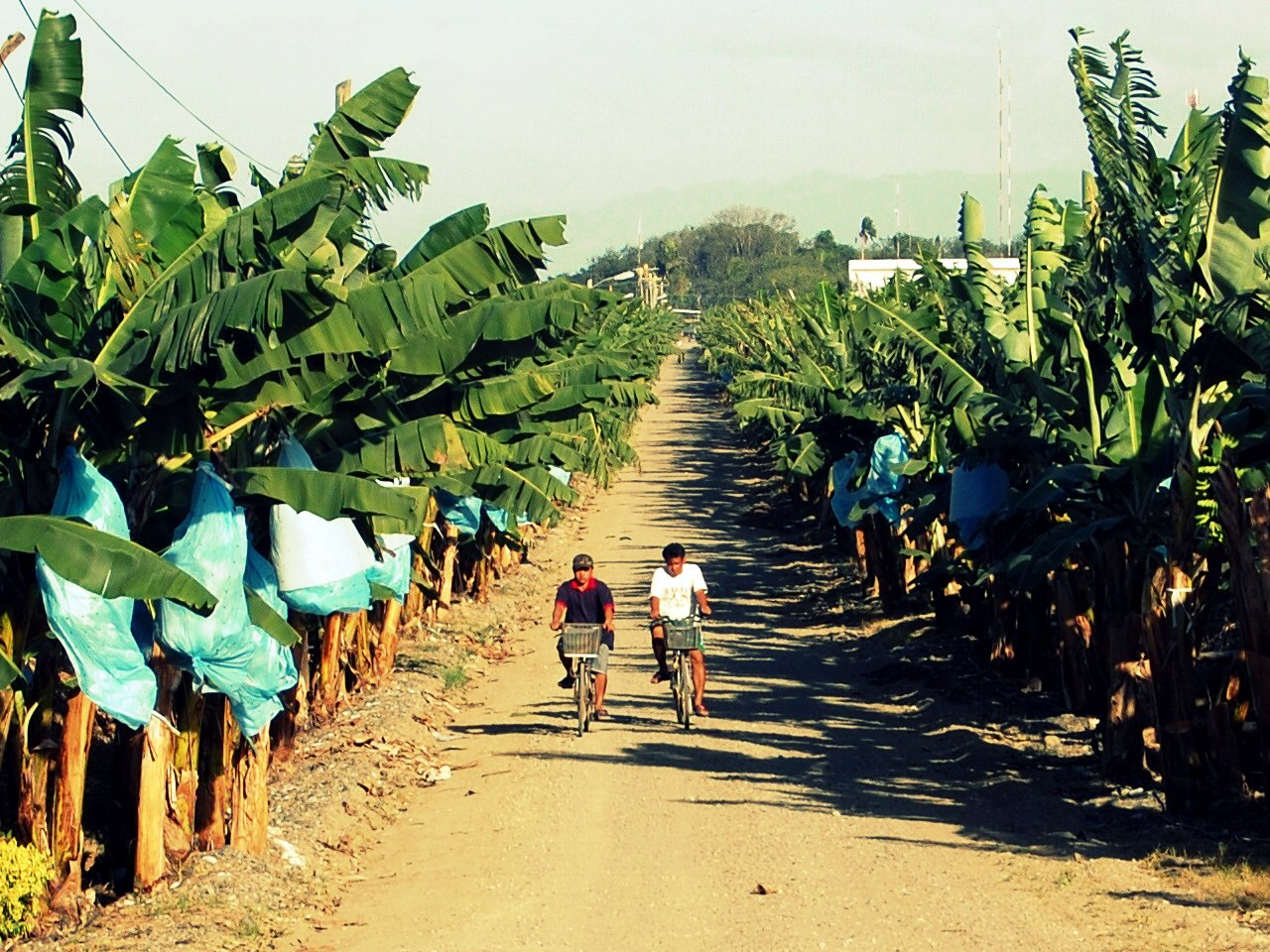
Banana plantations in Panabo

Being an agro-industrial city, Panabo is known as the "Banana Capital of the Philippines" due to numerous banana plantations scattered throughout the city. In fact, Panabo is the home of the world's biggest banana plantation, which is owned by the Tagum Agricultural Development Company (TADECO), which covers around 6,900 hectares of banana fields and produce millions of boxes of export-quality bananas annually. The city itself cultivated 40% of its land or around 10,000 hectares into planting export-quality Cavendish bananas. Thus, banana cultivation and exportation are the main economic lifeblood of the city.

== Infrastructure ==
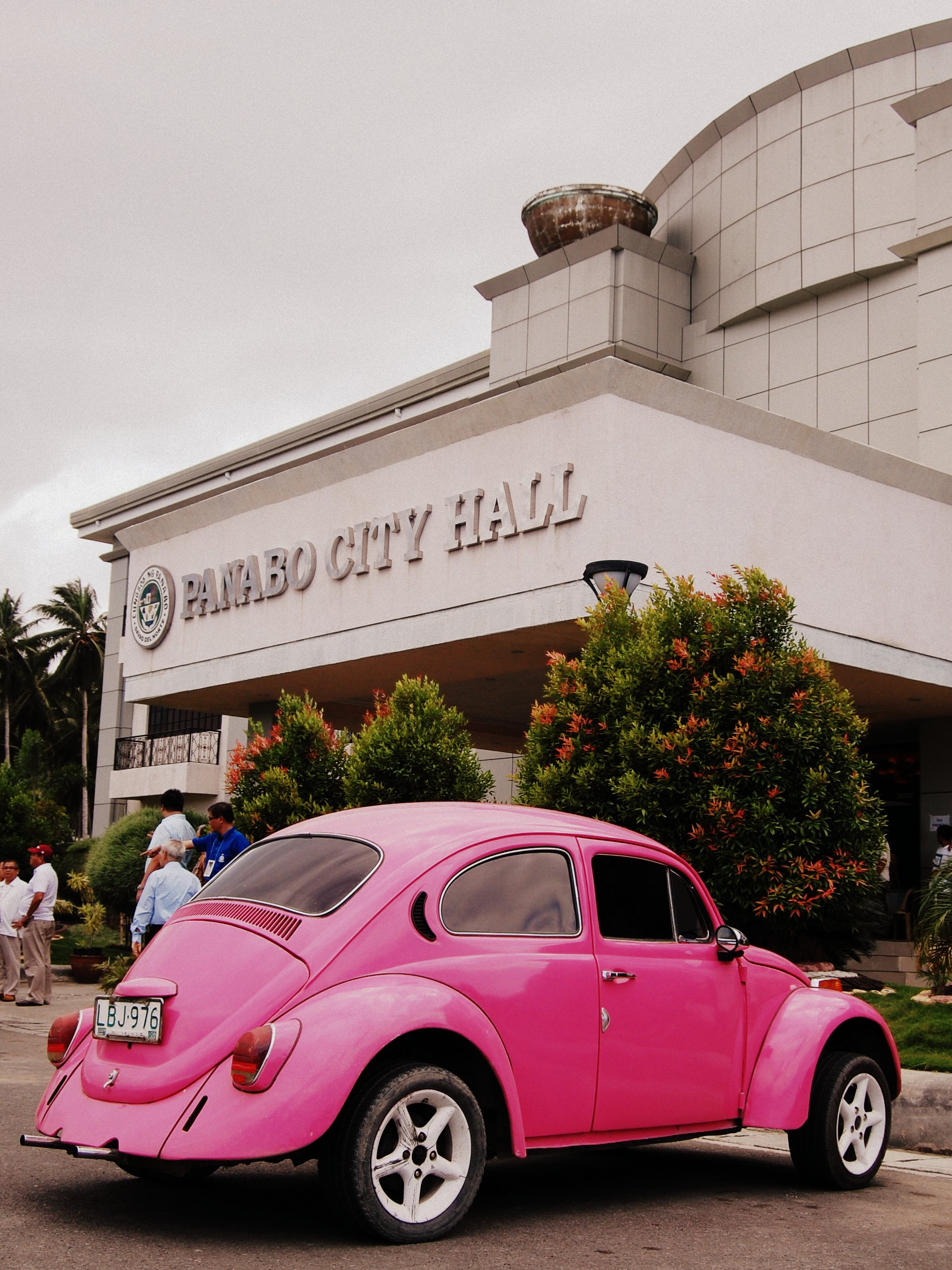
Panabo City Hall

There are two privately owned port facilities in the city, which enabled them to export various fruits, such as bananas, mangoes, papayas, and pineapples, to countries like Japan, South Korea, China, and countries as far in the Middle East and the European Union.

Public infrastructure includes the Freedom Park which features a unique banana inspired fountain sculpted by the world class artist Kublai Millan. The Panabo Multi-Purpose Tourism, Cultural and Sports Center, located beside the City Hall is also a public infrastructure, the gymnasium accommodates an estimated ten-thousand people and also serves as playing venue of the Philippine Basketball Association as well as serving concerts for the city.

=== Transportation ===
Panabo is served by the 6-lane Maharlika Highway and is a highway road junction heading to the TADECO banana plantation as well as to other parts of Davao del Norte and the northernmost areas of Davao City. Tricycles and jeepneys are the main mode of transportation in the city, while passenger buses and public utility vans serve overland routes within and outside the city.

== Education ==
A memorandum of agreement between UP Los Baños College of Agriculture and ANFLOCOR was signed for the establishment of UP Professional School for Agriculture and the Environment (UP PSAE) which will be UPLB's extension campus in Panabo City. In addition, UP Mindanao will also collaborate on some courses and programs to be offered.

=== Secondary Schools ===
- Sunbeam Christian School of Panabo, Inc. (private)
- ACES Polytechnic College, Inc. - Senior High School Department (private)
- Maryknoll College of Panabo (private)
- North Davao Colleges - High School Department (private)
- Northlink Technological College, Inc. - High School Department (private)
- Francisco Adlaon Learning Institute (private)
- Panabo SDA Learning Center (private)
- Panabo Christian School (private)
- Panabo City Senior High School (public)
- Panabo Achievers Academy (2nd year only) (private)
- Panabo City National High School (public)
- Little Panay National High School (public)
- Colegio de Davao, Panabo City (private)
- Good Shepherd Baptist School (Church School) (private)
- A. O. Floirendo National High School (public)
- Cagangohan National High School (public)
- Don Manuel A. Javellana Memorial National High School (public)
- Kasilak National High School (public)
- Kauswagan National High School (public)
- Mabunao National High School (public)
- Malativas National High School (public)
- Manay National High School (public)
- Quezon National High School (public)
- San Vicente National High School (public)
- Sindaton National High School (public)
- Southern Davao National High School (public)

=== Higher Educational Institutions ===
- ACES Polytechnic College, Inc. (private)
- Community Welfare Service Lotus Foundation School and Training Center, Inc. (private)
- Davao del Norte State College (public)
- Fortune Philippine College of Trades and Technology Inc. (private)
- Holy Child College of Davao del Norte Inc. (private)
- Maryknoll College of Panabo, Inc. (private)
- North Davao Colleges, Inc. (private)
- Northlink Technological College, Inc. (private)
- Northern Paramedical and Technological College, Inc. (private)
- The Leores Training Academy Inc. (private)
- University of Mindanao, Panabo College (private)
- Valiant Technical Institute and Assessment Center, Inc. (private)

== Notable personalities ==
- Jerwin Ancajas, boxer
- Dennis Denora, journalist and publisher
- Alan Dujali, politician
- Thor Dulay, The Voice PH semifinalist
- Jasmine Bacurnay Lee, Korean actress and politician

== Persona non grata ==
- Richard Heydarian

== Sister cities ==
=== Local ===
- Cotabato City
- Ozamiz
- Pagadian
- Parañaque
