= Reliance Broadcasting Unlimited =

Filipino media company

- Type: Private
- Industry: Mass media Telecommunications
- Founded: 2012
- Headquarters: New Street Building, MacArthur Highway, Balibago, Angeles City, Pampanga, Philippines
- Area served: Philippines
- Key people: Frank Martin Abalos (President)
- Products: Broadcasting; Satellite television
- Owner: Converge ICT (co-affiliate)

Reliance Broadcasting Unlimited (RBU) is a Filipino media and telecommunications. It is currently an affiliate of telecommunications company Converge ICT.

== History ==
=== Early years ===
On July 29, 2012, the Congressional franchise of RBU was enacted into law as Republic Act 10178. RBU began its operations in 2013 when the ownership of FM station DWDU in Clark, Pampanga was transferred from its previous owner Information Broadcast Unlimited. It also took over the operations of the regional/community cable channel PEP TV from ACCTN.

=== Venturing into satellite TV service ===
In July 2024, RBU began entering its new business venture after the National Telecommunications Commission (NTC) has given RBU to operate a direct-to-home (DTH) satellite TV service. RBU has signed a partnership with South Korea-based telecommunications service provider KT SAT to operate DTH satellite services via Koreasat 7 transponder satellite.

In April 2025, RBU had acquired the idle DTH satellite broadcast equipment and infrastructure of Sky Direct from its previous owner Sky Cable Corporation (a subsidiary of media conglomerate ABS-CBN Corporation). Sky Direct was previously shut down on June 30, 2020, after an alias cease-and-desist order by the National Telecommunications Commission (NTC).

== Assets ==
=== FM stations ===
Branding	Callsign	Frequency	Location	Operator
Magnum Radyo	DXMR	99.9 MHz	Cagayan de Oro	Radyo De Oro Corporation

=== Previous assets ===
Callsign	Frequency	Location
DWDU	105.5 MHz	Angeles City

PEP TV (formerly Community TV3 from 2010s to 2021) was a regional/community cable channel launched in 2004 by Angeles City Cable Television Network (ACCTN). It aired infotainment and public affairs programming catered to the Central Luzon community. On March 20, 2024, PEP TV ended its broadcast.
