= Thor (singer) =

Thor Dulay
- Born: Ettore Bungabong Dulay; 2 December 1980 (age 45); Panabo, Davao del Norte, Philippines
- Occupations: Singer, vocal coach, backing vocalist
- Years active: 2001–present
- Labels: Evolution Music (2004); Warner Music Philippines (2004); Ivory Records (2007–2009); Star Music (2014–present); Star Magic (2014–present)

Ettore Dulay, better known by his stage name Thor Dulay or simply as Thor, is a Filipino singer-songwriter and vocal coach.

== Biography ==
Born in Panabo City, Davao del Norte, he was a choirboy who began singing professionally at the age of nineteen. He finished his high school at Maryknoll High School of Panabo.

== Musical career ==
He graduated from Ateneo de Davao University before trying his luck in Manila with his band, Extreme Mix, now known as Myxtreme. He has also provided backing vocals for artists such as Luke Mejares and Jay-R.

His debut album was released in 2004 by Evolution Music, distributed by Warner Music.

Duets with Thor & Mccoy was a regular feature on Wave 89.1 and tracks from this were collected for his second solo album Soul Obsessions: Duets With Thor.

He was a part of Satya Project, an R&B-Soul-Jazz band led by Marcos Sainz and Juan Galiardo. The band recorded their first album, Shine A Light, in Spain. He was able to perform as front act for David Foster at the Araneta, won an Awit Award in 2004 for Best Collaboration with Nina, and another award in 2005 for the cut Kasalanan Nga Ba?" as Best Theme Song for that year's MMFF.

As a backing vocalist, Thor worked with several musical bands for various television shows such as Gandang Gabi Vice.

== Personal life ==
He is married to non-showbiz wife Mai Dulay, with his son, Mason.

Dulay is a graduate of Ateneo de Davao University.

=== 2013: The Voice of the Philippines ===
He auditioned for the first season of The Voice of the Philippines, which aired on ABS-CBN on Saturday, 15 June 2013. He sang "I Have Nothing" by Whitney Houston that had all four coaches offer him a place on their respective teams. He ultimately picked apl.de.ap to be his coach.

=== Performances/results ===
Show	Song	Original artist	Order	Result
Blind Audition	"I Have Nothing" "	Whitney Houston	7	Lea Salonga, Sarah Geronimo, Bamboo Mañalac and Apl.de.Ap; Dulay joined Apl.de.Ap's Team.
Battle Rounds	"I'll Make Love to You" (against Sir Lord Lumibao)	Boyz II Men	1	Winner
Week 1/Top 24	"Narito"	Gary Valenciano	5	Safe
Week 3/Top 16	"Lately"	Stevie Wonder	8	Safe
Week 5/Top 8	"Umagang Kay Ganda" (against Janice Javier)	Basil Valdez	4	Safe
Semi-final	"Climb Ev'ry Mountain"	The Sound of Music	7	Eliminated

=== 2014: Philpop 2014 and fourth studio album ===
On 26 July 2014, Thor took part as an interpreter for the song entry titled "The Only One" written by Venelyn San Pedro at the third Philippine Popular Music Festival. On 30 January 2015, he released his fourth studio album titled "Master Of Soul" under ABS-CBN's Star Music. The music video for its carrier single is "Paano Ko Sasabihin" premiered on 25 January.

== Discography ==
=== Studio album ===
Artist	Album	Tracks	Year	Records
Thor	Thor	Believe in Me; Someday, Somewhere, Somehow; Wonderland; I'll Always Stay in Love; Live Versions	2004	Warner Music
Thor	Soul Obsessions: Duets With Thor & Mccoy Ramos	OBB Intro; Be My Number Two (feat. MYMP); What About Love; Spend My Life With You; Whenever You Call (feat. Nina); Suddenly; Everytime I Close My Eyes; The Girl Is Mine; You Don't Know Me; I'm Ready; Just One Dance; Home	2007	Ivory Records
Thor	The Moonwalker	Got To Be There; Happy; I'll Be There; Ben; Music And Me; One Day in Your Life; Human Nature; Rock With You; Man in the Mirror; Way You Make Me Feel; Blame It on the Boogie; She's Out of My Life; I Just Can't Stop Loving You; You Are Not Alone	2009	Ivory Records
Thor	Master of Soul	I Miss You; I Have Nothing; I Finally Found Someone; Kung Maibabalik Ko Lang; Bakit Kung Sino Pa; Paano Ko Sasabihin 'Di Nagpaalam; Kung Talagang Wala Na Tayo; Di Na Maibabalik; There's No Easy Way to Break Somebody's Heart; Ikaw Na Lamang Siya; Paano Ko Sasabihin (Souledout Remix)	2015	Star Music
