= Converge ICT =

Internet service provider in the Philippines

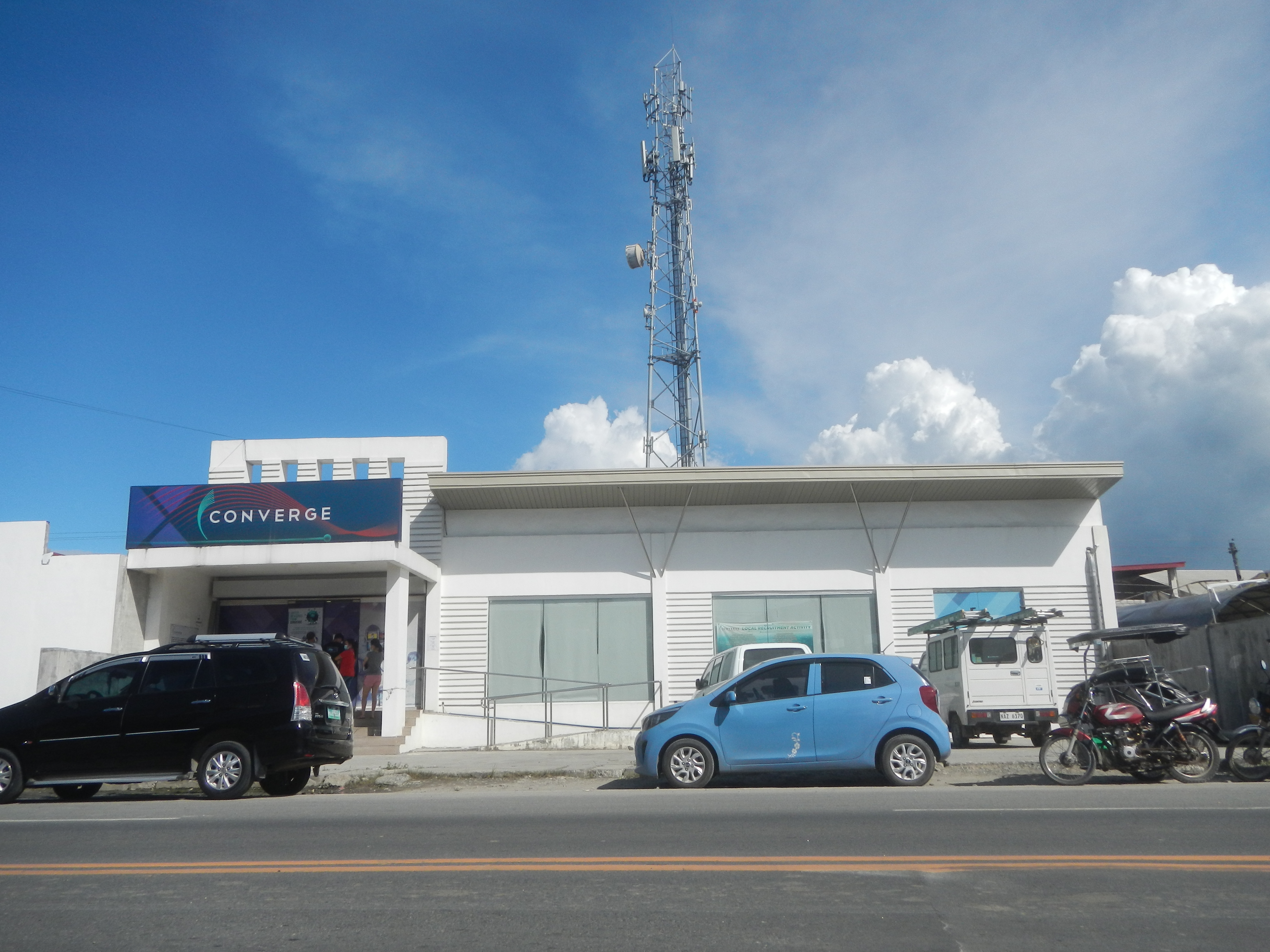
- A Converge ICT business center in Apalit, Pampanga
- Type: Public
- Traded as: PSE: CNVRG
- Industry: Communications services
- Founded: Angeles City, Philippines (October 17, 2007; 19 years ago)
- Founder: Dennis Anthony Uy; Maria Grace Y. Uy
- Headquarters: New Street Building, Mc Arthur Highway, Balibago, Angeles City, Pampanga; Corporate Office: Reliance IT Building, 99 E. Rodriguez Jr. Ave (C5), Barangay Ugong, Pasig City, Metro Manila, Philippines
- Area served: Philippines; Singapore
- Key people: Dennis Anthony Uy (CEO and executive director); Maria Grace Y. Uy (President, chief risk officer, chief resource officer, and executive director); Jesus C. Romero (Chief operating officer)
- Products: Cable television IPTV services Broadband services
- Brands: Air Cable; Air Internet; Converge FiberX; Converge Vision / Sky TV; Converge Business; Surf2Sawa Prepaid Fiber; BidaFiber
- Revenue: ▲ ₱35.36 billion (FY 2023)
- Net income: ▲ ₱12.12 billion (FY 2023)
- Owner: ComClark Network and Technology Corporation (66.02%); Public (33.91%)
- Number of employees: 3,379 (2023)
- Subsidiaries: Converge Venture Holdings Inc.; Converge ICT Solutions Global Ltd.; Converge ICT Singapore Pte. Ltd.; Telstra Converge Inc. (Joint venture with Telstra); Asia Netcom Philippines (Joint venture with ANPC)
- ASN: 17639
- Website: www.convergeict.com

Converge Information and Communications Technology Solutions Inc., doing business as Converge ICT or simply Converge, is a telecommunications service provider in the Philippines. It operates fiber-optic broadband networks, Internet Protocol television (marketed as Converge Vision in partnership with Pacific Kabelnet), cable television (marketed as Air Cable), and cable Internet (marketed as Air Internet) in the country. As of June 2023, it had 1,969,663 FiberX subscribers, capturing 56% of the country's fiber to the home market share. As of 2022, the Converge fiber backbone spanned 600,000 kilometers, reaching 495 cities and municipalities across the country.

== History ==
Converge was established in 1996 as the ComClark Network and Technology Corp. by Dennis Anthony Uy in 1996 at Angeles City.

In 2009, the Congress of the Philippines enacted Republic Act No. 9707, to grant Converge ICT Solutions Inc. the franchise to construct, install, establish, operate, and maintain a telecommunication system throughout the Philippines.

In 2020, Converge debuted in the Philippine Stock Exchange through an initial public offering.

In 2021, Uy told local media that a deal “is on” with Satellite Internet provider Starlink.

Demand for services surged during the pandemic, with an estimated 84% jump in revenue during the first quarter of the 2021 fiscal year.

In 2021, Converge also partnered with the Department of Trade and Industry (DTI) and local governments to provide free fiber-powered internet and tents at Diskwento Caravan.

In October 2021, Converge completed the domestic subsea cable project, with ₱6 billion investment cost.

In July 2024, Converge announced that their subsidiary Reliance Broadcasting Unlimited had been granted a license by the National Telecommunications Commission to broadcast free-to-air TV networks via satellite television in the country. They announced plans to launch the service with KT SAT, a subsidiary of KT Corporation, with an eye towards serving rural areas.

== Service areas ==
Converge serves fiber optic Internet access in Metro Manila, Calabarzon, Central Luzon and several parts of the Bicol and Ilocos regions, and continues to expand its coverage across the country.

Converge competes with PLDT and Globe Telecom as providers of fiber-to-the-home broadband Internet, in their respective areas of coverage. As of March 2022, it has around 1.8 million subscribers.

The company began deploying telecommunications infrastructure and connectivity services to Singapore in January 2023 through its subsidiary Converge SG after its license was approved by the Infocomm Media Development Authority.

== Affiliate companies ==
- Pacific Kabelnet Holdings - owns Converge Vision / Sky TV (Metro Manila) and FiberTV (provincial areas)
- Reliance Broadcasting Unlimited - owner of Sky Direct, formerly operates UFM 105.5 and PEP TV

== See also ==
- Converge FiberXers
