= Davao del Norte =

Province in Mindanao, Philippines

- Province
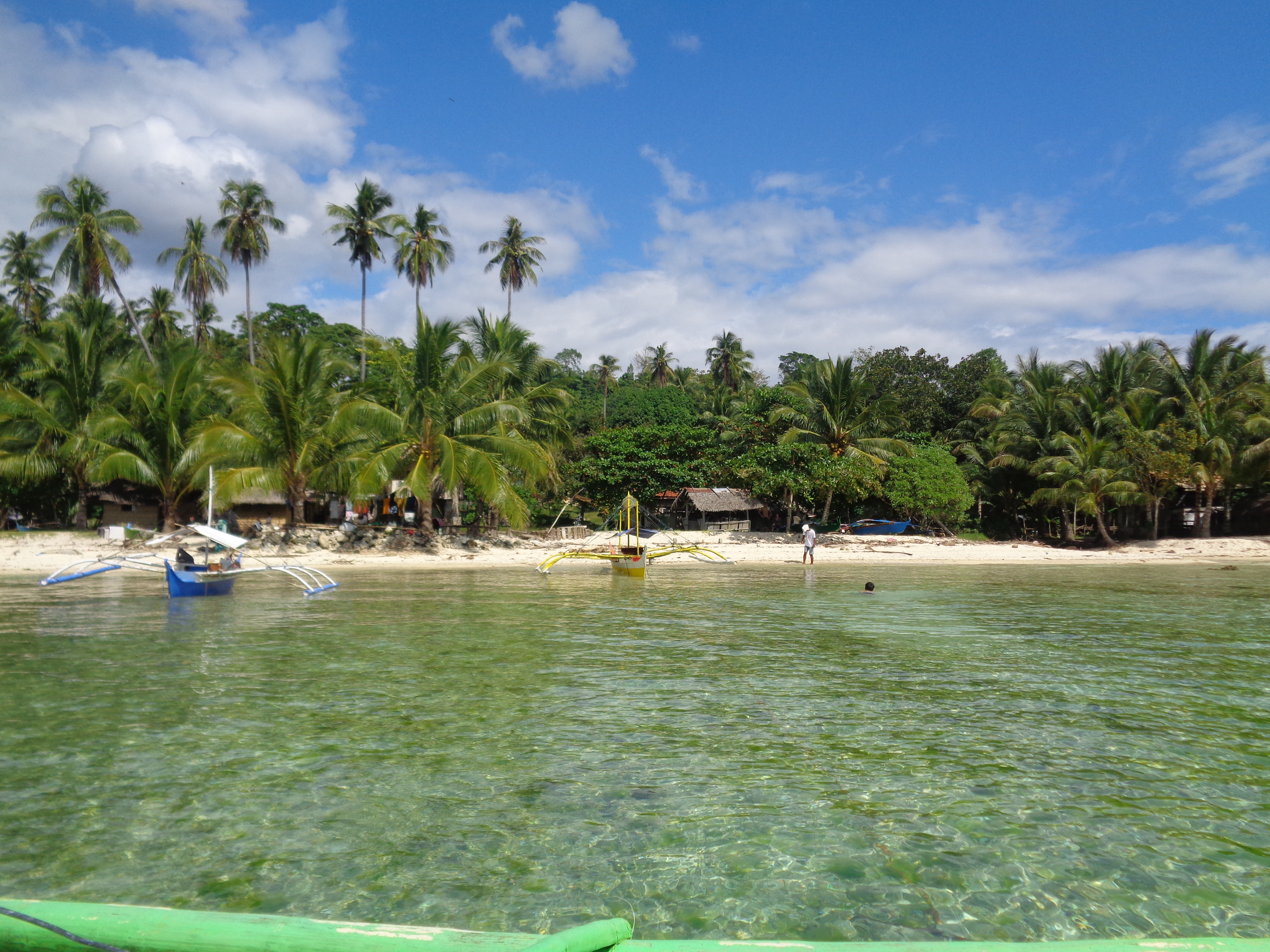
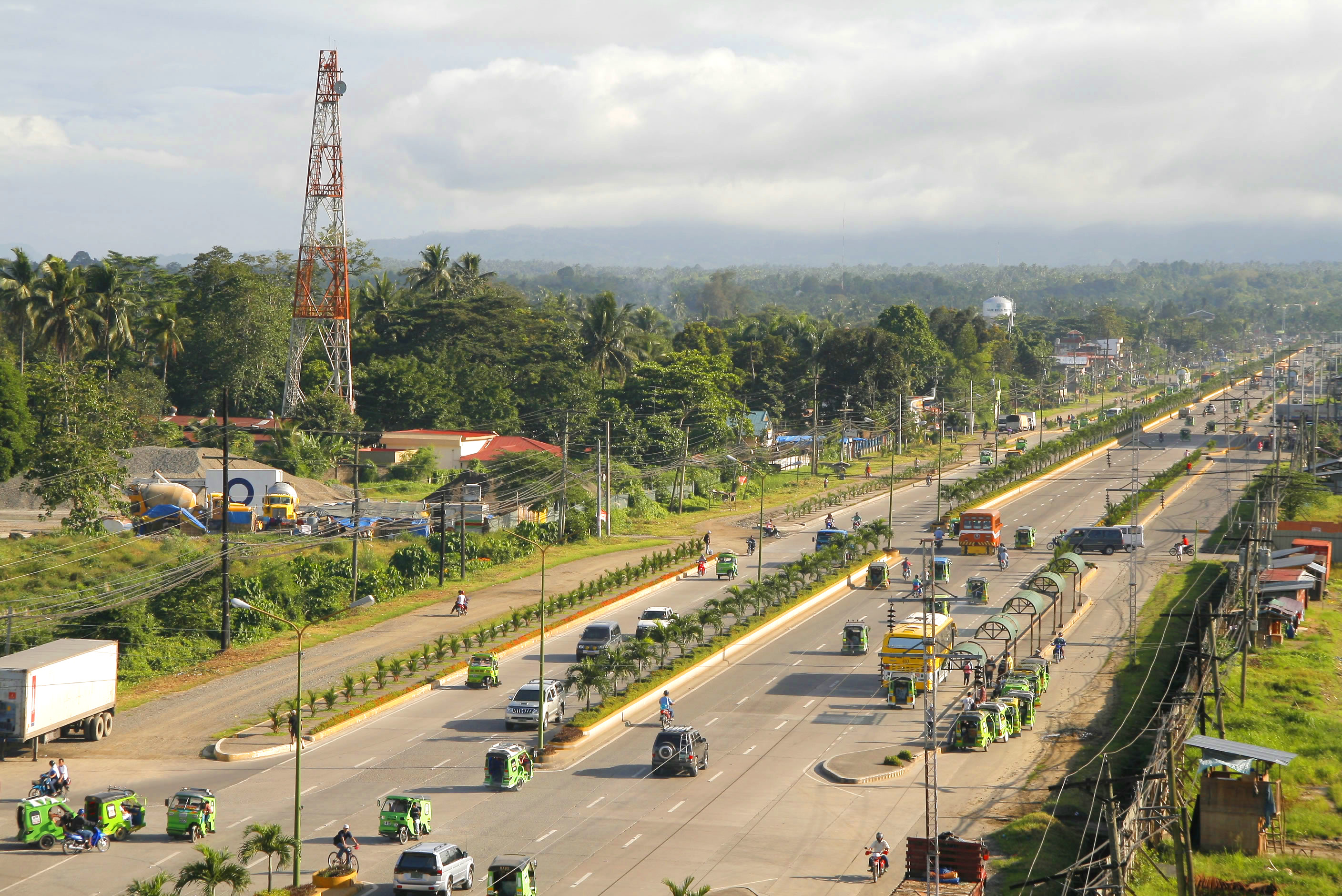
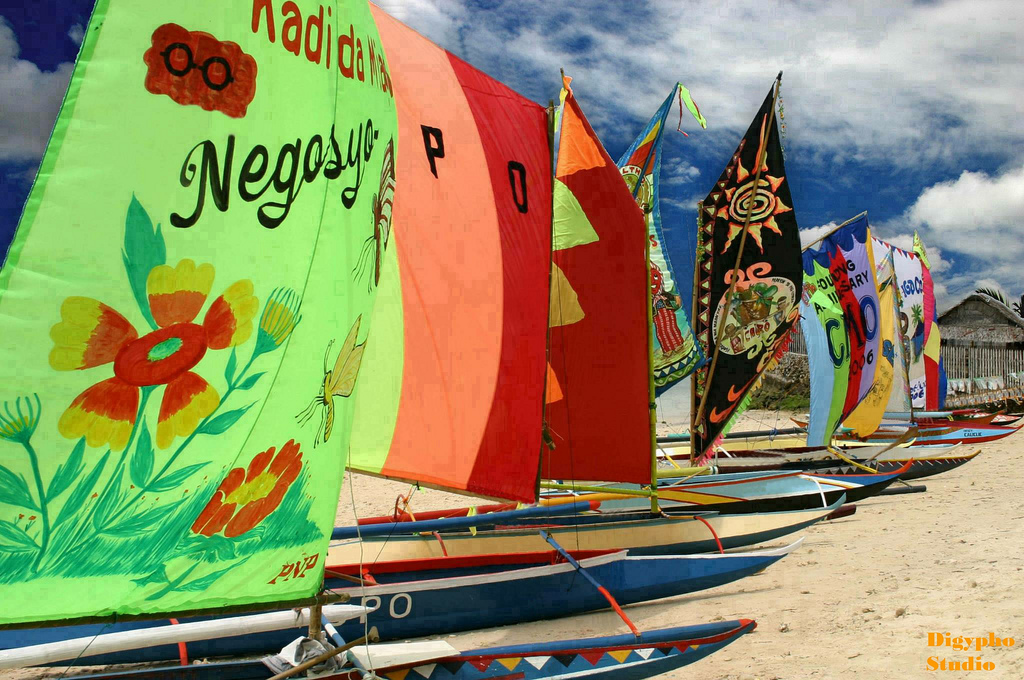
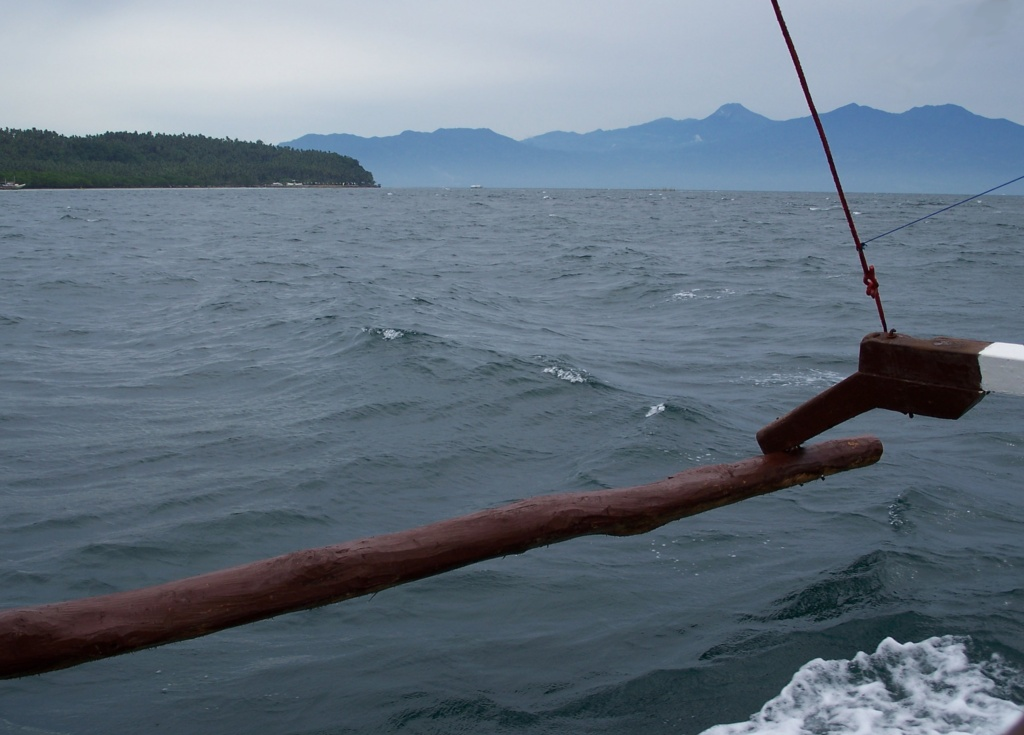
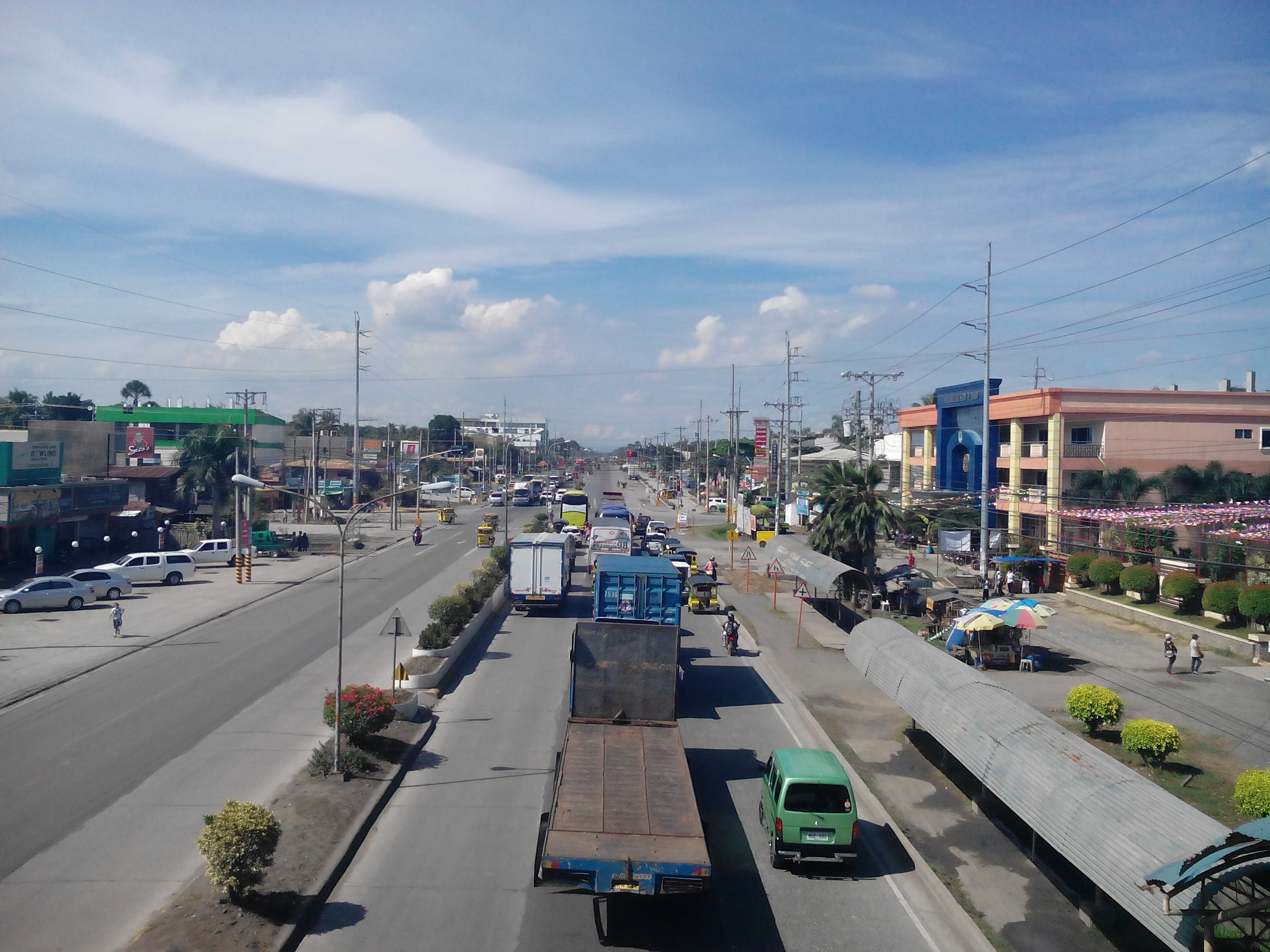
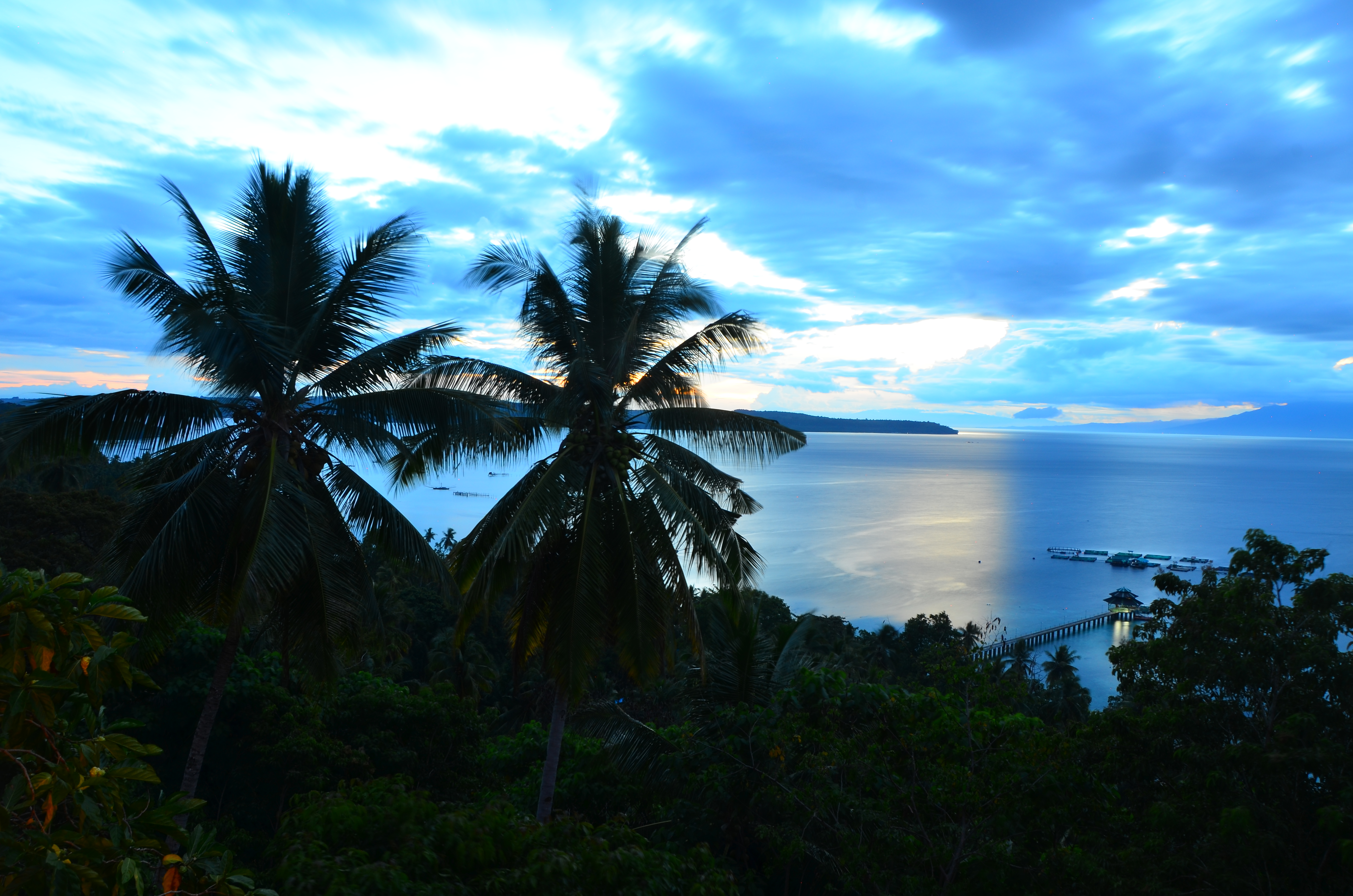
- (from top: left to right) Kaputian Island, Tagum City, Bigiw boats in Samal, Davao Gulf, Panabo City and Samal Island.

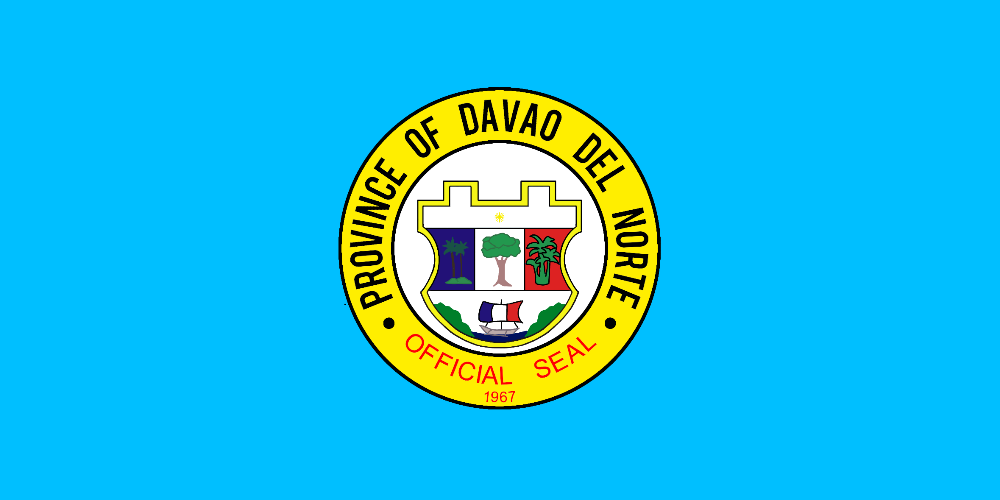
- Flag Seal
- Etymology: Davao del Norte (i.e., "Northern Davao")
- Nickname: "Banana Capital of the Philippines"
- Anthem: Davao del Norte Hymn
- Location in the Philippines
- Interactive map of Davao del Norte
- Coordinates: 7°21′N 125°42′E
- Country: Philippines
- Region: Davao Region
- Founded: May 8, 1967
- Capital and largest city: Tagum

Government
  - Governor: Edwin I. Jubahib (PFP)
  - Vice Governor: Clarice T. Jubahib (PFP)
  - Legislature: Davao del Norte Provincial Board
  - Electorate: 717,449 voters (2025)

Area
  - Total: 3,422.61 km^{2} (1,321.48 sq mi)
  - Rank: 39th out of 82
- Highest elevation (Mount Masimalon): 1,115 m (3,658 ft)

Population (2024 census)
  - Total: 1,143,931
  - Rank: 25th out of 82
  - Density: 334.228/km^{2} (865.646/sq mi)
  - Rank: 24th out of 82
  - Households: 271,655
- Demonym(s): Dabawnon; Davaonon; Nortedavaoeño; Davnoreño

Divisions
  - Independent cities: 0
  - Component cities: Panabo; Samal; Tagum
  - Municipalities: Asuncion; Braulio E. Dujali; Carmen; Kapalong; New Corella; Santo Tomas; Sawata; Talaingod
  - Barangays: 223
  - Districts: Legislative districts of Davao del Norte

Economy
  - Income class: 1st provincial income class
  - Poverty incidence: 7.3% (2023)
  - Revenue: ₱ 2,947 million (2024)
  - Assets: ₱ 8,342 million (2024)
  - Expenditure: ₱ 2,769 million (2024)
  - Liabilities: ₱ 1,927 million (2024)
- Time zone: UTC+8 (PHT)
- PSGC: 1102300000
- IDD : area code: +63 (0)84
- ISO 3166 code: PH-DAV
- Spoken languages: Cebuano; Davaoeño; Mansaka; Filipino; English
- Website: www.davaodelnorte.gov.ph

Davao del Norte (Cebuano: Amihanang Dabaw; Filipino: Hilagang Davao), officially the Province of Davao del Norte (Cebuano: Probinsya sa Amihanang Dabaw, Probinsya sa Davao del Norte; Filipino: Lalawigan ng Hilagang Davao, Lalawigan ng Davao del Norte), is a province in the Philippines located in the Davao Region in Mindanao. Its capital and largest city is Tagum. The province also includes Samal Island to the south in Davao Gulf.

Before 1967, the five provinces—Davao de Oro, Davao del Norte, Davao del Sur, Davao Occidental, Davao Oriental—and Davao City were administered as a single province named Davao, a provincial district of the Department of Mindanao and Sulu. The present-day Davao Region is coterminous with this former province.

Davao del Norte is also known as "The Banana Capital of the Philippines” and is the most populous province in the Davao Region.

== History ==
=== Establishment ===
Davao del Norte and Davao de Oro (Compostela Valley) by R.A. 8470, January 30, 1998, together with Davao Oriental, and Davao Occidental from Davao del Sur by R.A. 10360, January 14, 2013, used to be a whole province simply known as Davao Region. This original province was split into three: Davao del Norte, Davao Oriental, and Davao del Sur when Republic Act No. 4867 (authored by Representative Lorenzo Sarmiento) was signed into law on May 8, 1967, by President Ferdinand Marcos.

Davao del Norte originally comprised thirteen municipalities: Asuncion, Babak (now in Samal), Compostela, Kapalong, Mabini, Mawab, Monkayo, Nabunturan, Panabo, Pantukan, Samal, Santo Tomas and Tagum. On May 6, 1970, six more municipalities were created: Carmen, Kaputian (now in Samal), Maco, Montevista, New Bataan, and New Corella.

The passage of Republic Act No. 6430 on June 17, 1972, changed the name of the province from Davao del Norte to Davao.

=== Martial law era ===
For Davao del Norte and the island of Mindanao, things began to take a turn for the worse during the last months of Ferdinand Marcos' first presidential term. Marcos' debt-driven election spending had precipitated an economic crisis by late 1969, which then led to social unrest, violent crackdowns on protests, and eventually to the radicalization of many students throughout the country. In addition, news of the 1968 Jabidah massacre ignited ethnic tensions which encouraged the formation of secessionist movements in Mindanao. The September 1972 declaration of Martial Law then began a 14-year period historically remembered for its human rights abuses, often involving the warrantless detention, murder, and physical, sexual, or mental torture of political opponents, student activists, journalists, religious workers, farmers, and others who fought against the Marcos dictatorship. Among the most prominent of these victims were student activist Godofredo Abellana and labor organizer Eduardo Lanzona, who both fled political persecution in the urban areas and worked in the rural areas of Davao Del Norte.

Another major event in Davao Del Norte during this era was the establishment of a massive banana plantation in the province by Marcos crony Antonio Floirendo Sr., a major contributor to Marcos's 1965 and 1969 presidential campaigns. After Floirendo's initial business plans were rebuffed by the Senate during prior administrations, Marcos gave Floirendo special permission to lease 6,000 hectares of government land despite a 1,024 hectare limit, and to also hire prisoners from the Davao Penal Colony (Dapecol) as his laborers, soon allowing Floirendo to export bananas to the lucrative Japanese market and establishing him as the Philippines' "Banana King."

=== Contemporary history ===
By 1996, Davao province had a total of 22 municipalities with the creation of San Vicente (now Laak) in 1979, Maragusan in 1988, and Talaingod in 1991.

On January 31, 1998, President Fidel V. Ramos signed Republic Act No. 8470, which split the province into two, creating the province of Davao de Oro (Compostela Valley). In the meantime, Davao province was renamed back to Davao del Norte. Together with the creation of the new province, two cities and one municipality were created: the municipality of Tagum, capital of Davao del Norte, was converted into a city (R.A. 8472); Samal, Babak, and Kaputian were joined into the city of Samal (R.A. 8471); and the municipality of Braulio E. Dujali was created out of several barangays in Panabo and Carmen (R.A. 8473). The province then had eight municipalities and two cities.

Republic Act No. 9015, signed into law on March 5, 2001, by President Gloria Macapagal Arroyo, converted the municipality of Panabo into a city. Republic Act No. 9265, approved on March 15, 2004, created the municipality of San Isidro from Asuncion and Kapalong. In 2026, San Isidro was renamed as Sawata following a plebiscite.

== Geography ==
Davao del Norte covers a total area of 3,426.97 square kilometres (1,323.16 sq mi) occupying the north-central section of the Davao Region. The province borders Agusan del Sur to the north, Bukidnon to the west, Davao de Oro to the east, and Davao City to the south.

Samal is the only municipality or city in the province not situated on Mindanao island. The city covers the entire Samal and Talikud Islands within Davao Gulf.

=== Administrative divisions ===
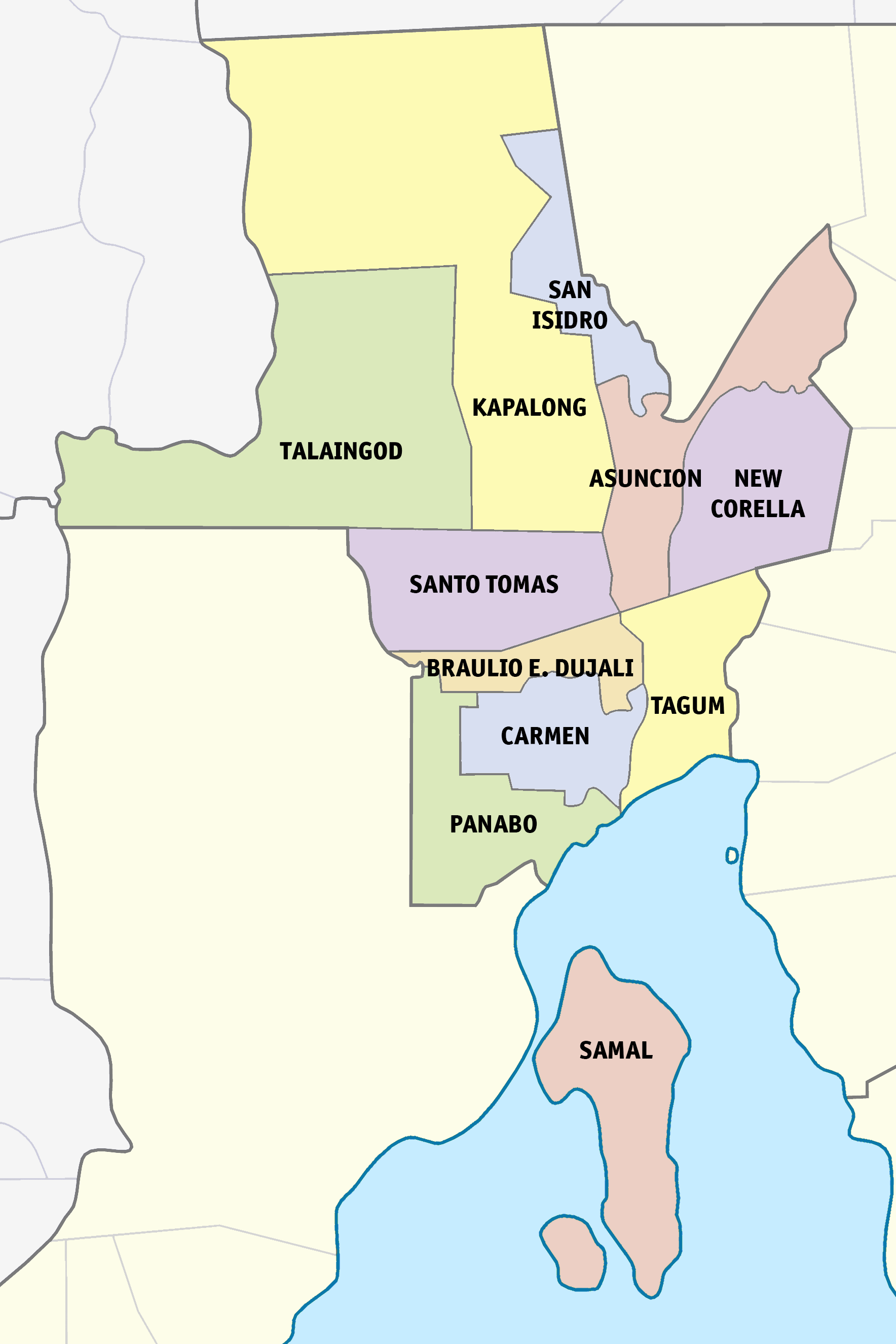
Political map of Davao del Norte

Davao del Norte comprises eight municipalities and three cities.

Provincial capital and component city
Component city

City or municipality	District	Population			±% p.a.	Area		Density		Barangay	Coordinates †
		(2020)		(2015)		km^{2}	sq mi	/km^{2}	/sq mi		
Asuncion	1st	5.5%	61,893	59,322	+0.81%	297.39	114.82	210	540	20	7°32′18″N 125°45′12″E
Braulio E. Dujali	2nd	3.2%	35,729	30,104	+3.32%	91.00	35.14	390	1,000	5	7°26′54″N 125°41′22″E
Carmen	2nd	7.3%	82,018	74,679	+1.80%	166.00	64.09	490	1,300	20	7°21′20″N 125°42′16″E
Kapalong	1st	7.2%	81,068	76,334	+1.15%	830.01	320.47	98	250	14	7°35′07″N 125°42′26″E
New Corella	1st	5.1%	57,913	54,844	+1.04%	263.12	101.59	220	570	20	7°35′12″N 125°49′20″E
Panabo	2nd	18.6%	209,230	184,599	+2.41%	251.23	97.00	830	2,100	40	7°18′01″N 125°40′57″E
Samal	2nd	10.4%	116,771	104,123	+2.21%	301.30	116.33	390	1,000	46	7°04′28″N 125°42′31″E
Santo Tomas	2nd	11.4%	128,667	118,750	+1.54%	221.80	85.64	580	1,500	19	7°31′43″N 125°37′26″E
Sawata	1st	2.4%	27,233	26,651	+0.41%	152.49	58.88	180	470	13	7°44′18″N 125°44′49″E
Tagum	1st	26.3%	296,202	259,444	+2.55%	195.80	75.60	1,500	3,900	23	7.4468°N 125.8095°E
Talaingod	1st	2.5%	28,333	27,482	+0.58%	656.83	253.60	43	110	3	7.6256°N 125.6185°E
Total			1,125,057	1,016,332	+1.95%	3,426.97	1,323.16	330	850	223	
† Coordinates are sortable by latitude — Italicized coordinates mark the generic location. Otherwise, they indicate the city/town center)

== Demographics ==
Population census of Davao del Norte
Year	Pop.	±% p.a.
1903	9,554	—
1918	23,701	+6.24%
1939	60,349	+4.55%
1948	91,367	+4.72%
1960	262,889	+9.21%
1970	442,543	+5.34%
1975	589,697	+5.93%
1980	725,153	+4.22%
1990	1,056,301	+3.83%
1995	1,191,443	+2.28%
2000	743,811	−9.61%
2007	847,440	+1.82%
2010	945,764	+4.08%
2015	1,016,332	+1.38%
2020	1,125,057	+2.16%
2024	1,143,931	+0.40%
data prior to 2000 excludes municipalities under Davao de Oro that were part of the province until 1998. Source: Philippine Statistics Authority

Davao del Norte had a population of 1,143,931 in the 2024 census. The population density was 334/km^{2} (865/sq mi). The province's population consists of people of Visayan descent whose ancestors came from Cebu, Bohol, Negros Oriental and Siquijor, though many of the province's residents also descended from 20th century migrants from Ilocandia, Cagayan Valley, Cordillera Administrative Region, Central Luzon, Calabarzon, Mindoro, Marinduque and Bicolandia in Luzon and Panay and Negros Occidental in Visayas. The main languages spoken are Cebuano and Davawenyo while English and Filipino are also widely spoken. Majority of the Davao del Norte residents are Roman Catholic Christians, but many of them adhere to the other Christian denominations such as Iglesia ni Cristo, Members Church of God International, Seventh Day Adventists, Pentecostal churches and the Church of Jesus Christ of Latter-day Saints. There is also a sizeable Muslim population in the province, many of whom are Kalagans, Maguindanaons and the migratory Maranaos with small but growing demographic of converts to Islam known as the Balik Islam.

=== Indigenous groups ===
Talaingod is the home of many Indigenous groups in Davao del Norte, with most of them Lumads and Aetas.

== Economy ==
Poverty incidence of Davao del Norte (%)

Source: Philippine Statistics Authority

Davao del Norte is primarily agricultural, but also engages in mining, forestry, and commercial fishing.

The principal crops of the province include rice, maize, banana, coconut, abacá, ramie, coffee, and a variety of fruit and root crops. Davao del Norte is the country's leading producer of bananas, with many plantations run by multinationals Dole and Del Monte, and local producers such as Lapanday, TADECO, and Marsman. Davao del Norte is also one of Mindanao's leading producers of rice.

Davao Gulf, to the south of the province, provides a living for many fisherfolk. Some of the fish products include brackish water milkfish, tilapia, shrimp, and crab; and freshwater catfish and tilapia.

Davao del Norte is a major producer of gold, and its mining resources include silica, silver, copper, and elemental sulfur. Small-scale gold mining activities thrive in several areas. There are also numerous active quarries of commercial quantities of gravel, sand, and pebbles for construction.

Tourism is also a major part of the economy of Davao del Norte. There are a lot of beaches on Samal Island, the most famous of which is Pearl Farm Beach Resort. Banana Beach Resort is the most famous beach outside of Samal Island.

Commerce is also a major part of the economy of Davao del Norte. There are lot of shopping malls in Tagum.

== Notable people ==
- Jerwin Ancajas - boxer
- Dennis Denora - journalist and publisher
- Thor Dulay - The Voice Ph semifinalist
- Jasmine Bacurnay Lee - Filipino-born naturalized Korean actress and politician
- Arrel Olaño - politician
- Alan Dujali - politician
- Jay Durias - singer
- Maris Racal - actress and runner-up of Pinoy Big Brother: All In
- Iwa Moto - actress, model and runner up of StarStruck (season 3)
- Allan L. Rellon - politician former mayor of Tagum 2013–2022
- Pantaleon Alvarez - politician, the former Speaker of the House of Representatives of the Philippines and a Congressman from the First District of Davao del Norte
- Yesha Camile - child actress in ABS-CBN and a former host of Team Yey!
- Lie Reposposa - former housemate of Pinoy Big Brother: Otso
