= Bangsamoro =

Autonomous region of the Philippines

Bangsamoro بانجسامورو
- Autonomous region
- Bangsamoro Autonomous Region in Muslim Mindanao
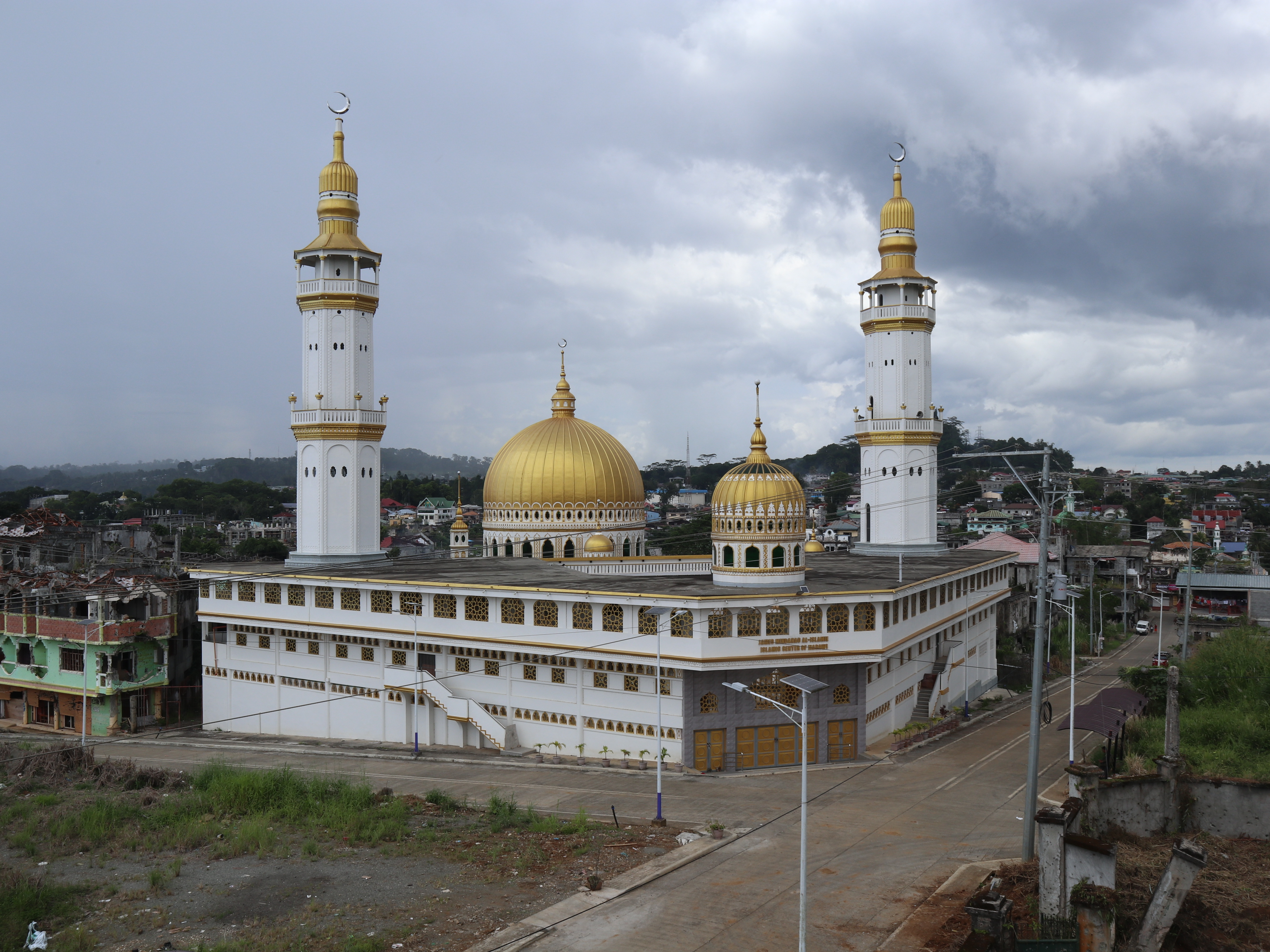
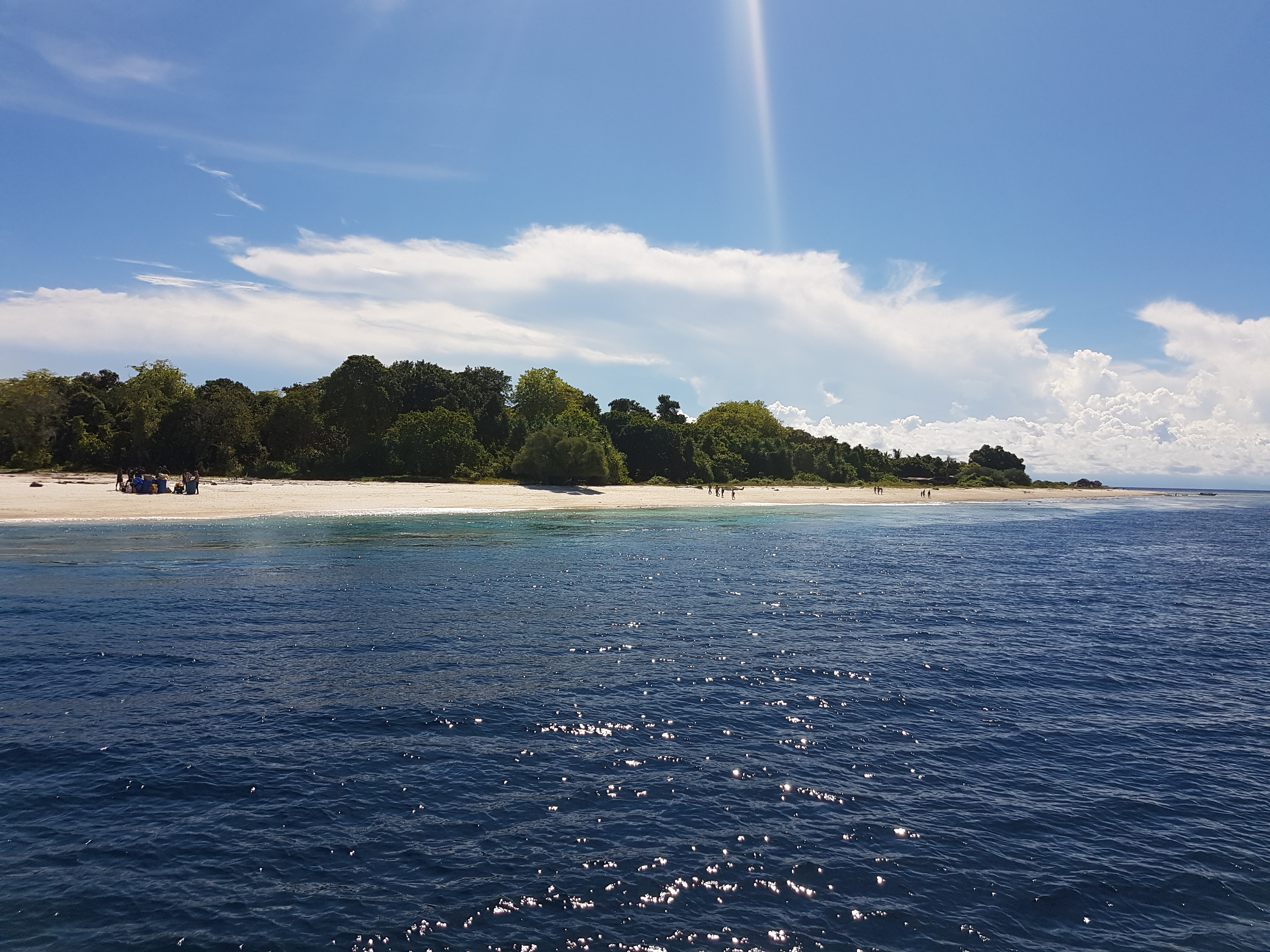
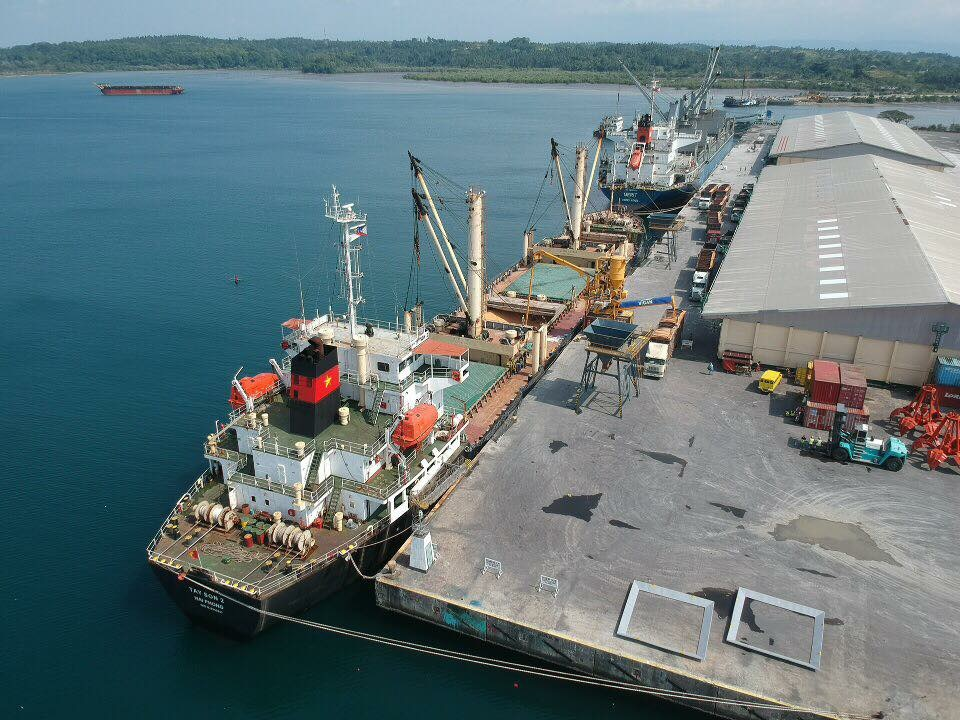
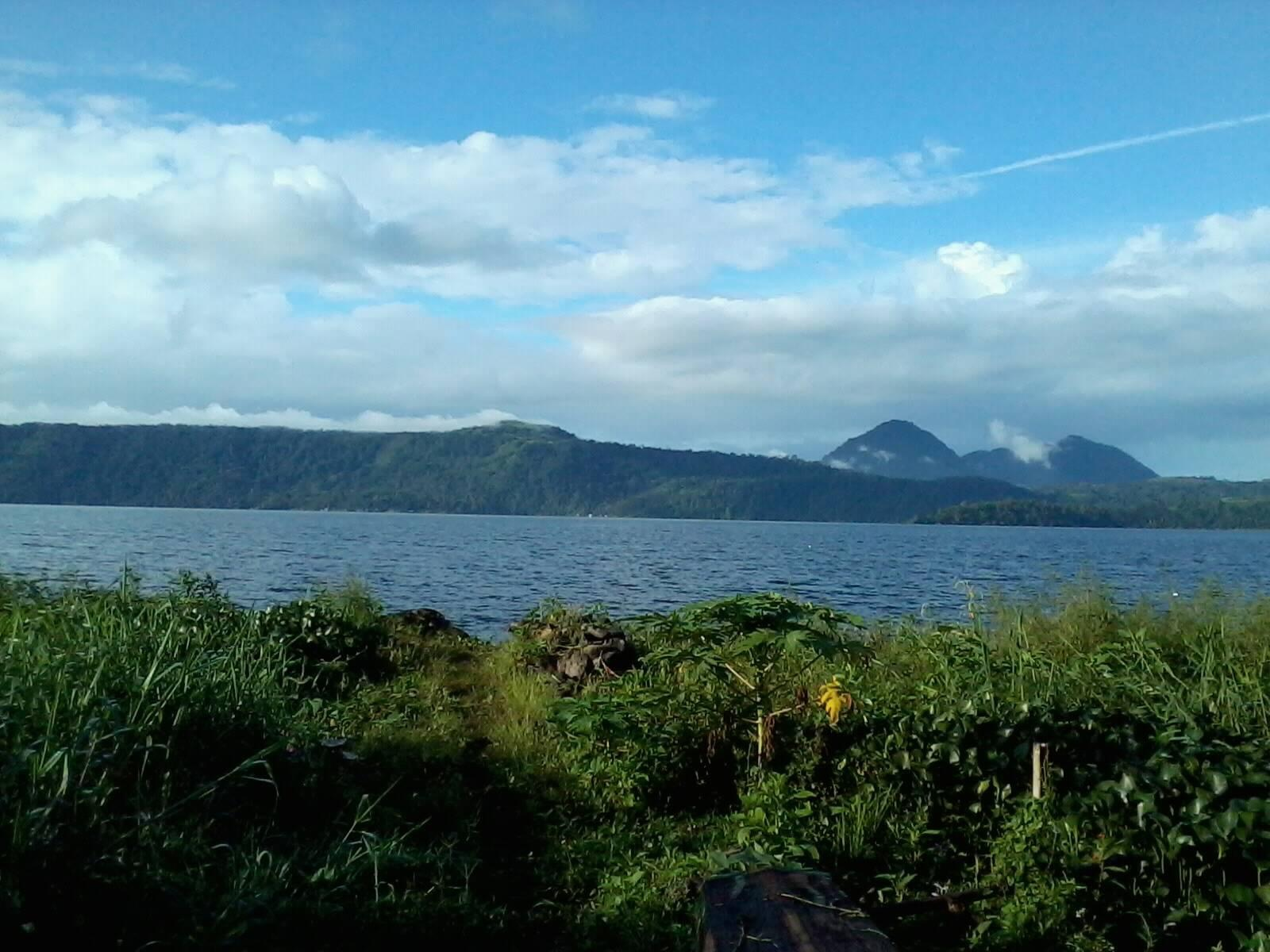
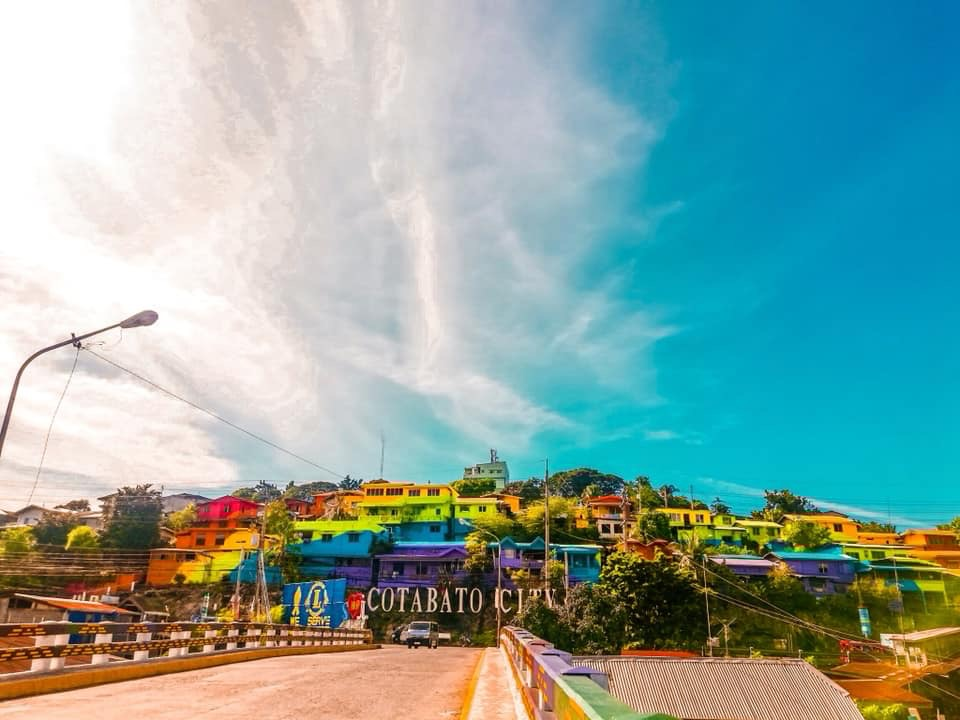
- Left to right, top to bottom: Marawi Grand Mosque; Panguan Island; Polloc Port, Parang, Maguindanao del Norte; Cotabato Grand Mosque; Lanao Lake at Marawi City and PC Hill, Cotabato City

- Flag Seal
- Anthem: "Bangsamoro Hymn"
- Location in the Philippines
- Interactive map of Bangsamoro
- Coordinates: 7°13′N 124°15′E
- Country: Philippines
- Island group: Mindanao
- Creation plebiscite^{c}: January 21, 2019
- Turnover^{c}: February 26, 2019
- Inauguration of government: March 29, 2019
- Seat: Cotabato City (de facto) (Note: The seat of government as defined by the Bangsamoro Organic Law. The recognized seat from Bangsamoro's establishment in 2019 until it was moved to Parang in Maguindanao (now Maguindanao del Norte) in 2023. The regional government still de facto exercise power from the Bangsamoro Government Center in Cotabato City.); Parang, Maguindanao del Norte (de jure) (Note: The de jure seat of government since mid-2023 as per Bangsamoro Autonomy Act No. 37. However the regional government has yet to establish a physical government center in the municipality which shall be done in a gradual basis.)

Government
  - Type: Devolved parliamentary government within a unitary presidential republic
  - Body: Bangsamoro Parliament
  - Wa'lī: Muslim Guiamaden
  - Chief Minister: Abdulraof Macacua
  - Deputy Chief Ministers: Ali Solaiman (Deputy for the Mainland); Albakil Jikiri (Deputy for the Islands)
  - Speaker of the Parliament: Amer Zaakaria Rakim
  - Electorate: 2,393,530 voters (2026)

Area
  - Total: 11,935.7 km^{2} (4,608.4 sq mi)

Population (2024 census)
  - Total: 5,691,583
  - Density: 476.854/km^{2} (1,235.05/sq mi)
  - Households: 832,908
- Demonym: Bangsamoro

Divisions
  - Provinces: 5: Basilan (except Isabela City); Lanao del Sur; Maguindanao del Norte; Maguindanao del Sur; Tawi-Tawi
  - Cities: 3: Cotabato City; Lamitan; Marawi
  - Municipalities: 106
  - Barangays: 2,135 (including 63 in the Special Geographic Area in Cotabato)
  - Legislative districts: 6
  - Parliamentary districts: 32

Economy
  - Poverty incidence: 12.8% (2025)
  - GDP total: US$6.8 billion (2024)
  - GDP per capita: US$1,278 (2024)
  - HDI (2023): 0.638 medium · 17th of 17
- Time zone: UTC+08:00 (PST)
- PSGC: 1900000000
- Languages: Maguindanaon; Maranao; Yakan; Tausug; Sama; Iranun; Tiruray; Sabah Malay; Tagalog; Filipino; English; Arabic; Chavacano; Cebuano
- Website: bangsamoro.gov.ph
- In various local languages written in Jawi script Two-part plebiscite held in two dates. The first part held on January 21, 2019, was for the ratification of the Bangsamoro Organic Law, the charter legislation of the region while the second part was to determine the final possible expanded scope of the region's territory. January 21, 2019, is recognized as the "Bangsamoro Foundation Day" as per the Bangsamoro Administrative Code. Effective dissolution of the predecessor autonomous region, Autonomous Region in Muslim Mindanao (ARMM) and turnover of governance to the interim body, Bangsamoro Transition Authority. The Philippine Statistics Authority (PSA) used the scope of the former Autonomous Region in Muslim Mindanao as its geographic reference for the 2020 census when it was released on July 7, 2021. Cotabato City and the Special Geographic Area were then not included its population count for Bangsamoro. Statistics for said localities were included in the PSA's count for Soccsksargen. On November 9, 2021, as per PSA Board Resolution No. 13 Series of 2021, Cotabato City and the Special Geographic Area were included in its population count for Bangsamoro and removed from Soccsksargen. Figures still include Sulu which was excluded from the region in 2024.

Bangsamoro, officially the Bangsamoro Autonomous Region in Muslim Mindanao (BARMM; Filipino: Rehiyong Awtonomo ng Bangsamoro sa Muslim Mindanao; Arabic: منطقة بانجسامورو ذاتية الحكم في مينداناو المسلمة, romanized: Minṭaqah Banjisāmūrū dhātiyyah al-ḥukm fī Mīndānāw al-muslimah), is an autonomous region in the Philippines, located in the southwestern portion of the island of Mindanao.

Replacing the Autonomous Region in Muslim Mindanao (ARMM), the BARMM was formed with the ratification of its basic law, the Bangsamoro Organic Law, following a two-part legally binding plebiscite in Western Mindanao held on January 21 and February 6, 2019. The ratification was confirmed a few days later on January 25 by the Commission on Elections (COMELEC).

The establishment of Bangsamoro was the culmination of several years of peace talks between the Philippine government and several autonomist groups; in particular the Moro Islamic Liberation Front (MILF), which rejected the validity of the ARMM and called for the creation of a region with more powers devolved from the national government. A framework agreement known as the Comprehensive Agreement on the Bangsamoro was negotiated between the national government and the MILF in 2014. After continued negotiations and debates over certain provisions, the Congress of the Philippines created and ratified a basic law for the region, now referred to as the Bangsamoro Organic Law; the bill was signed into law on July 26, 2018.

Despite questions on the region's constitutionality, as it would have adopted a parliamentary system in an area of a country with a presidential system of government, no judicial ruling was made against the organic law and consequently a two-part plebiscite was held: one by ARMM citizens determining whether to dissolve the ARMM and immediately replace it with the Bangsamoro and, following the approval on the first part, a second part taken by neighboring municipalities and barangays in the provinces of Lanao del Norte and Cotabato regarding their cession to the Bangsamoro region. As a result of the second part of the plebiscite, 63 barangays of Cotabato province were handed over to the Bangsamoro government, adding to the autonomous region's territory.

The Bangsamoro took the place of the ARMM as the only Muslim-majority autonomous region in the Philippines. While the transition ended in 2026, the Bangsamoro government has been considered a testing ground for the wider debate on constitutional reform and federalism in the Philippines.

On September 9, 2024, the Supreme Court of the Philippines, voting unanimously, mostly upheld the constitutionality of the Bangsamoro Organic Law but declared the province of Sulu to not be part of the autonomous region because of its simple majority vote against its inclusion therein during the 2019 Bangsamoro autonomy plebiscite.

== Etymology ==
The recently coined term Bangsamoro is derived from the Old Malay word bangsa ("race" or "nation") and Moro (the collective term for the various predominantly Muslim ethnic groups in the Philippines, from Spanish moro, "Moor").

== History ==
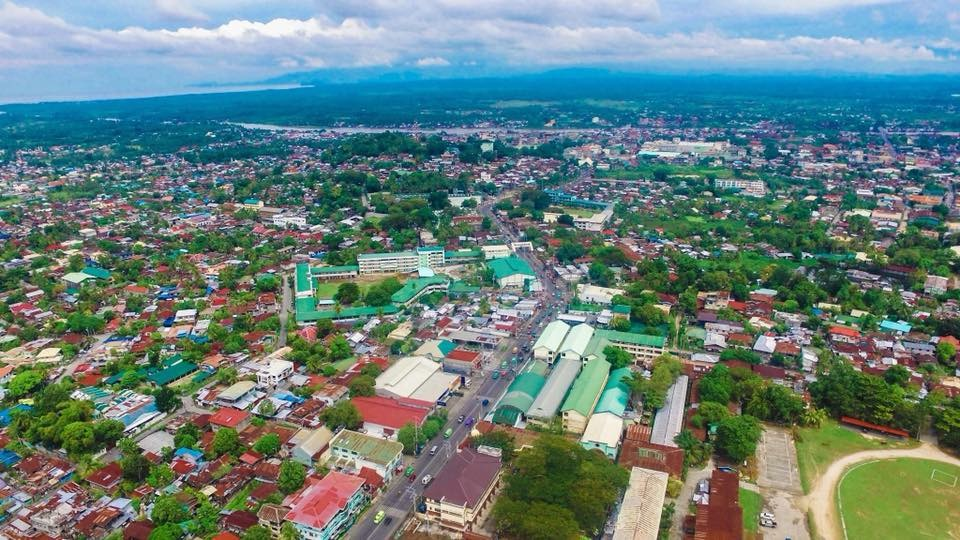
A view of Cotabato City as seen in February 2018

=== Early history and arrival of Islam ===
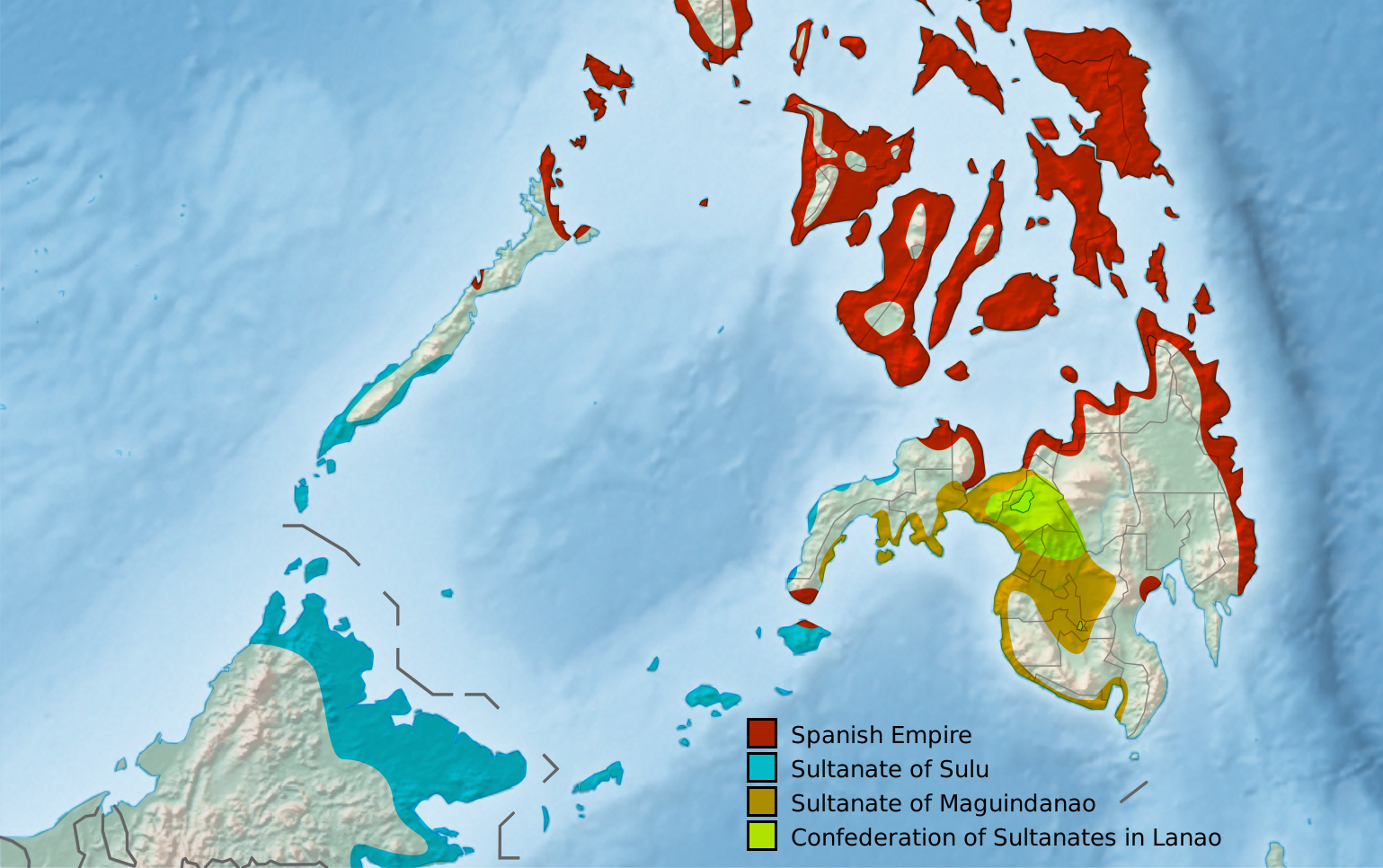
Approximate historical extent of the Muslim sultanates of Sulu, Maguindanao and Lanao

For the most part of Philippines' history, the region and most of Mindanao have been a separate territory, which enabled it to develop its own culture and identity. The westernmost and west-central areas have been the traditional homeland of Muslim Filipinos since the 15th century, even before the arrival of the Spanish, who began to colonize most of the Philippines in 1565. The majority of Mindanao was the homeland of indigenous Lumad groups, who were neither Christians nor Muslims.

Sunni Sufi scholars from the Ba 'Alawi sada who were also merchant arrived in Tawi-Tawi in 1380 and started doing business while also preaching Islam teaching to the native of the area which led to the conversion of the native population to Islam. In 1457, the Sultanate of Sulu was founded, and not long after that, the sultanates of Maguindanao and Buayan were also established. At the time when most of the Philippines was under Spanish rule, these sultanates maintained their independence and regularly challenged Spanish domination of the Philippines by conducting raids on Spanish coastal towns in the north and repulsing repeated Spanish incursions in their territory. It was not until the last quarter of the 19th century that the Sultanate of Sulu formally recognized Spanish suzerainty, but these areas remained loosely controlled by the Spanish as their sovereignty was limited to military stations and garrisons and pockets of civilian settlements in Zamboanga and Cotabato, until they had to abandon the region as a consequence of their defeat in the Spanish–American War.

=== Spanish and American colonial rule ===
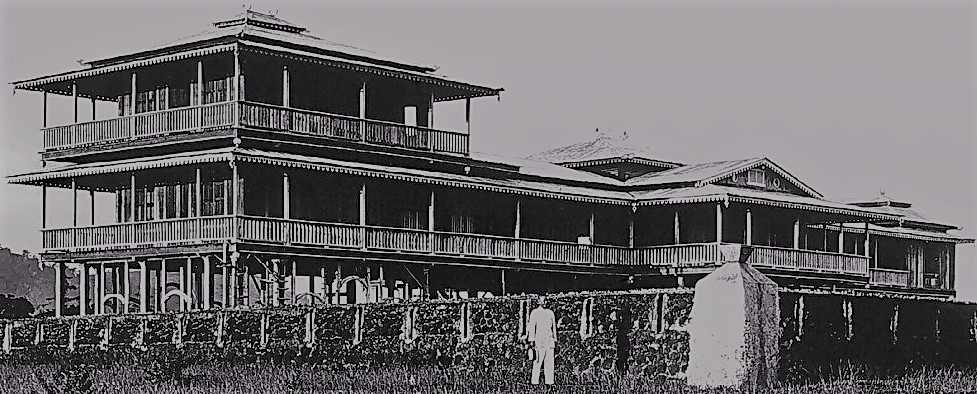
Darul Jambangan (Palace of Flowers) in Maimbung, Sulu before it was destroyed by a typhoon in 1932.

The Moros had a history of resistance against Spanish, American, and Japanese rule for over 400 years. The violent armed struggle against the Japanese, Filipinos, Spanish, and Americans is considered by modern Moro Muslim leaders as part of the four centuries long "national liberation movement" of the Bangsamoro (Moro Nation), although the term is only used in mainland Mindanao as those in the Sulu archipelago had a much distinct culture. The 400-year-long resistance against the Japanese, Americans, and Spanish by the Moro Muslims persisted and morphed into a war for independence against the Philippine state.

The Filipinos in the northern and central Philippines either volunteered or were forced to surrender the existing city-states to become a part of the Spanish regime except for the islands occupied by the Muslims in the southern Philippines. The three-century rule of the Spaniards did not result in the full conquest of the archipelago due to the resistance of the Moros. The violence and brutality of the Spaniards in their attempts to suppress the Moro groups have resulted in killing numerous families and setting villages on fire.

The United States' Insular Government of the Philippine Islands had only been in existence for two years in 1903 when it initiated the "Homestead Program," which was meant to encourage migration of landless populations from non-Muslim areas of the country into the Muslim-majority areas in Mindanao. Lanao and Cotabato in particular saw an influx of migrants from Luzon and Visayas. This influx of migrants led to tensions about land ownership and disenfranchisement of Lumads and Muslims, because the mostly-Christian migrants established claims on the land, whereas the native peoples of Mindanao did not have a land titling system in place at the time. This US-led Homestead Program, which was later continued or copied by Philippine administrations after independence, is therefore often cited as one of the root-causes of what would later become the larger Moro conflict.

In 1942, during the early stages of the Pacific War of the Second World War, troops of the Japanese Imperial Forces invaded and overran Mindanao, and the native Moro Muslims waged an insurgency against the Japanese.

Three years later, in 1945, combined United States and Philippine Commonwealth Army troops liberated Mindanao, and with the help of local guerrilla units, ultimately defeated the Japanese forces occupying the region.

=== Postwar era ===
Under pressure to resolve agrarian unrest in various parts of the country and noting that Mindanao was rich in mineral resources and weather favorable to agriculture, later Philippine presidents continued the promotion of migration which the American colonial government began in 1903. Massive arrivals of non-Muslim migrants happened particularly during the Commonwealth period under President Manuel Quezon and later under right-wing presidents Ramon Magsaysay and Ferdinand Marcos. As a result, the proportion of indigenous peoples in Mindanao to shrink from majority in 1913 to minority by 1976. The best lands in Mindanao were given to settlers and owners of corporate agriculture, while most development investments and government services were offered to the Christian population. This caused the Muslim population to be backward and rank among the poorest in their own country. The resettlement programme was not entirely peaceful as some settlers managed to obtain land from the native Muslims through harassment and other violent efforts which drove the Muslims out of their own lands.

The Muslims felt alienated by the Philippine government and felt threatened by the migrants' economic and political domination in their own homeland, the same way the Lumads were displaced centuries ago when Islam arrived in the Philippines. Some Muslim groups turned to extortion and violence to protect their land and avoid being displaced. These activities prevented the Muslims from easily integrating with the rest of the country.

The Philippine government did not immediately recognize Islamic laws which resulted in the system of education and the socioeconomic development of the Muslims. Children studying in public schools were forced to learn about Christianity while the Bangsamoros struggled with their economy, land, and ownership, and the persistence of hostile and unjust actions compared to the Christian communities in Mindanao.

As an effect of the resettlement, traditional Muslim leaders (also referred as datu) were also voted out during the polls as Christians, who made up a significant majority of the voters, preferred the Christian politicians over them. These local datus suffered a loss in prestige as they could no longer control the Muslim lands. These politicians lost much of the capabilities they had possessed initially to manage the Muslim populace.

=== Moro conflict ===
In March 1968, fishermen in Manila Bay rescued a Muslim man named Jibin Arula from the waters. They discovered that he had suffered from gunshot wounds, and he later recounted that he was the lone survivor of what would later be termed the "Jabidah Massacre."

According to Jibin Arula's account, the Marcos administration had gathered a group of Tausūg recruits for an operation called "Project Merdeka" (merdeka being the Malay "freedom"). The military began training them on the island of Corregidor to form a secret commando unit called Jabidah, which would destabilize and take over Sabah. The trainees eventually rejected their mission, for reasons that are still debated by historians today. Jibin Arula said that whatever the reasons behind their objections, all of the recruits aside from him were killed, and he escaped only by pretending to be dead. Marcos loyalist Juan Ponce Enrile, who served as Justice Secretary and Defense Minister during the Marcos administration, claimed this was a hoax, which was reputed as fake news and an attempt "absolve him (Enrile) of his crimes as the architect of martial law".

In Lanao del Sur, Domocao Alonto established the Ansar El Islam (Helpers of Islam) along with Sayyid Sharif Capt. Kalingalan Caluang, Rashid Lucman, Salipada Pendatun, Hamid Kamlian, Udtog Matalam, and Atty. Macapantun Abbas Jr. Accordingly, "it is a mass movement for the preservation and development of Islam in the Philippines". The advocacy of Ansar El Islam would, later on, inspire the creation of the Moro National Liberation Front (MNLF) and the MILF.

Then Lanao del Sur congressman Rashid Lucman called for Congress to begin proceedings to impeach President Marcos after the exposé implied that Marcos was ultimately responsible for the massacre. When his proposal didn't get enough congressional support, he became convinced that Muslims should rule themselves in Muslim Mindanao - a conviction which led him to eventually establish the Bangsamoro Liberation Organization (BMLO), which later joined forces with the Moro National Liberation Front (MNLF).

Cotabato governor Datu Udtog Matalam saw the anger of the Muslim people of Mindanao and established the Muslim Independence Movement (MIM), which openly called for the secession of the region to create a Muslim state. The MIM did not last long because Datu Udtog Matalam negotiated with Marcos and accepted a post in his cabinet, but many of its members broke away and became the main force of the MNLF.

On September 23, 1972, Ferdinand Marcos announced that he had placed the entirety of the Philippines, including Muslim Mindanao, under martial law. During this tumultuous period, relationships and alliances played a critical role in shaping the events. Tun Mustapha, then Chief Minister of Sabah, shared a common lineage with Sayyid Capt. Kalingalan “Apuh Inggal” Caluang, both tracing their ancestry back to the Sultans of Sulu. This shared heritage fostered a close bond between the two leaders, promoting goodwill and cooperation between their respective territories. With Tun Mustapha's support, the first cadre of MNLF fighters, including figures like Al Hussein Caluang, received training in Sabah after their time in Luuk, Sulu (now known as Kalingalan Caluang). While Datu Udtog Matalam's MIM was already defunct, one of its former members, Nur Misuari, established the MNLF a month after the declaration of Martial Law, on October 21, 1972.

Proclamation 1081 dissolved the various political groups that had been previously established in the Moro provinces, and with the MIM having already been dissolved, Marcos' declaration of martial law effectively assured the MNLF, which was more radical than its predecessors, would come to dominate the Moro separatist movement.

=== Peace process ===
On December 23, 1976, the Tripoli Agreement was signed between the Philippine government and the MNLF with the deal brokered by then-Libyan leader Muammar Gaddafi. Under a deal an autonomous region was to be created in Mindanao.

Marcos would later implement the agreement by creating two regional autonomous governments, rather than one, in Regions 9 and 12, which cover ten (instead of thirteen) provinces. This led to the collapse of the peace pact and the resumption of hostilities between the MNLF and Philippine government forces.

In signing the 1976 Tripoli Agreement, however, Misuari did not consult one of the MNLF's key commanders, Salamat Hashim. Salamat formed a splinter faction along with 57 other MNLF ground commanders, which then became the Moro Islamic Liberation Front (MILF).

A year after Marcos was ousted from power during the People Power Revolution, the government under President Corazon Aquino signed the 1987 Jeddah Accord in Saudi Arabia with the MNLF, agreeing to hold further discussions on the proposal for autonomy to the entirety of Mindanao and not just the thirteen provinces stated in the 1976 Tripoli Agreement. In 1989, however, an act establishing the Autonomous Region in Muslim Mindanao (ARMM) was passed. The MNLF demanded that the thirteen Tripoli Agreement provinces, majority of which were Christian provinces, be included in the ARMM, but the government refused; eight of those provinces were predominantly Christian. Shortly thereafter, the government held only four provinces as only Lanao del Sur, Maguindanao, Sulu and Tawi-tawi voted to be included in the ARMM. The four provinces were the only Muslim-majority provinces at the time.

==== Formation of ARMM and 1996 peace deal ====
A plebiscite was held in 1989 for the ratification of the charter which created the Autonomous Region in Muslim Mindanao (ARMM), with Zacaria Candao, a counsel of the MNLF as the first elected regional governor. On September 2, 1996, a final peace deal was signed between the MNLF and the Philippine government under President Fidel Ramos. MNLF leader and founder Nur Misuari was elected regional governor three days after the agreement. Another plebiscite was held in 2001 for the expansion of the region, with the city of Marawi and the province of Basilan (excluding Isabela) joining the region.

==== Peace talks with the MILF ====
In 1996, peace talks between the Philippine government and MNLF's rival group, the MILF, began. The first deal between the national government and the MILF was made in 2008: the Memorandum of Agreement on Ancestral Domain (MOA-AD). The agreement would be declared unconstitutional by the Supreme Court many weeks later. The deal would have led to the creation of the Bangsamoro Juridical Entity (BJE). Under the administration of President Benigno Aquino III, two deals were agreed upon between the national government and the MILF: the Framework Agreement on the Bangsamoro, which was signed on October 15, 2012, and the Comprehensive Agreement on the Bangsamoro, on March 27, 2014, which included plans regarding the establishment of a new autonomous region. In 2012, Aquino announced intentions to establish a new autonomous political entity to be named Bangsamoro to replace the ARMM, which he called a "failed experiment". Under his administration, a draft for a Bangsamoro Basic Law (BBL) was formulated but failed to gain traction to become law, owing in part to the Mamasapano clash that occurred in January 2015 that involved the murder of 44 mostly-Christian Special Action Force (SAF) personnel by allegedly combined forces of the MILF and the Bangsamoro Islamic Freedom Fighters (BIFF) after an operation to kill Malaysian militant Zulkifli Abdhir, known by the alias "Marwan".

=== Creation of Bangsamoro ===
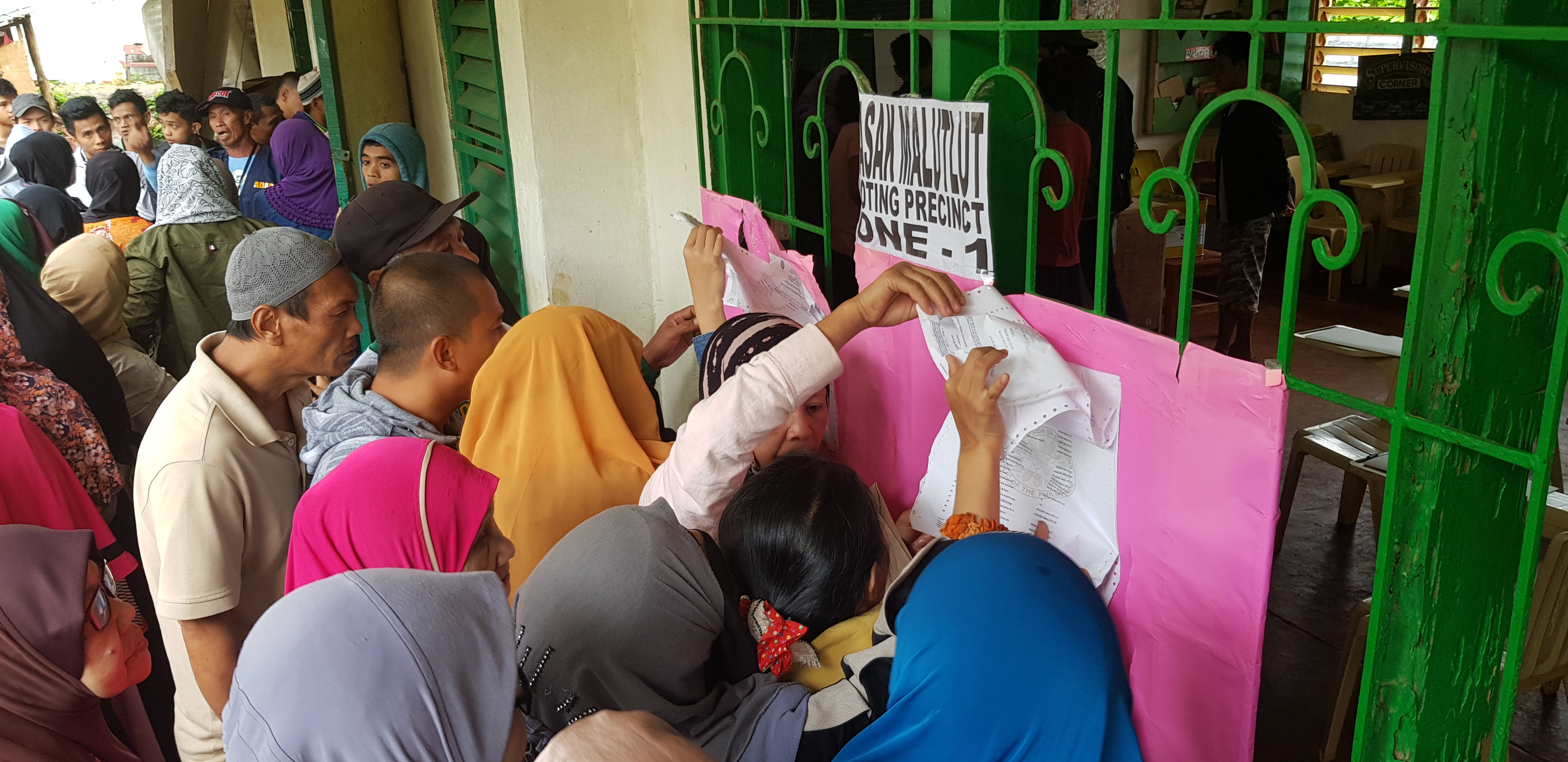
Voters look for their names at a precinct in Marawi during the January 21 BOL plebiscite.

Under the presidency of Aquino's successor, Rodrigo Duterte, a new draft for the BBL was made and became legislated into law as the Bangsamoro Organic Law (BOL) in 2018. A plebiscite to ratify the BOL was held on January 21, 2019, with a majority of ARMM voters deciding for the ratification of the law. Voters in Cotabato City voted to join the new autonomous region, while voters in Isabela City voted against inclusion. The Commission on Elections proclaimed that the BOL was "deemed ratified" on January 25, 2019. The provincial government of Sulu, where majority voted against inclusion, was also not in favor of the law, with its governor challenging the constitutionality of the law before the Supreme Court. Despite voting against inclusion, Sulu was still included in the Bangsamoro region due to rules stated in the BOL, sparking outrage from residents.

In February 2019, the second round of the plebiscite was held in the province of Lanao del Norte and some towns in Cotabato. The plebiscite resulted in the inclusion of 63 of 67 barangays in Cotabato that participated. It also resulted in the rejection from the province of Lanao del Norte against the bid of six of its Muslim-majority towns to join the Bangsamoro, despite the six towns (Balo-i, Munai, Nunungan, Pantar, Tagoloan and Tangcal) opting to join the Bangsamoro by a sheer majority, with one town even voting for inclusion by 100%. A major camp of the MILF was within the Muslim areas of Lanao del Norte.

==== Transition process ====
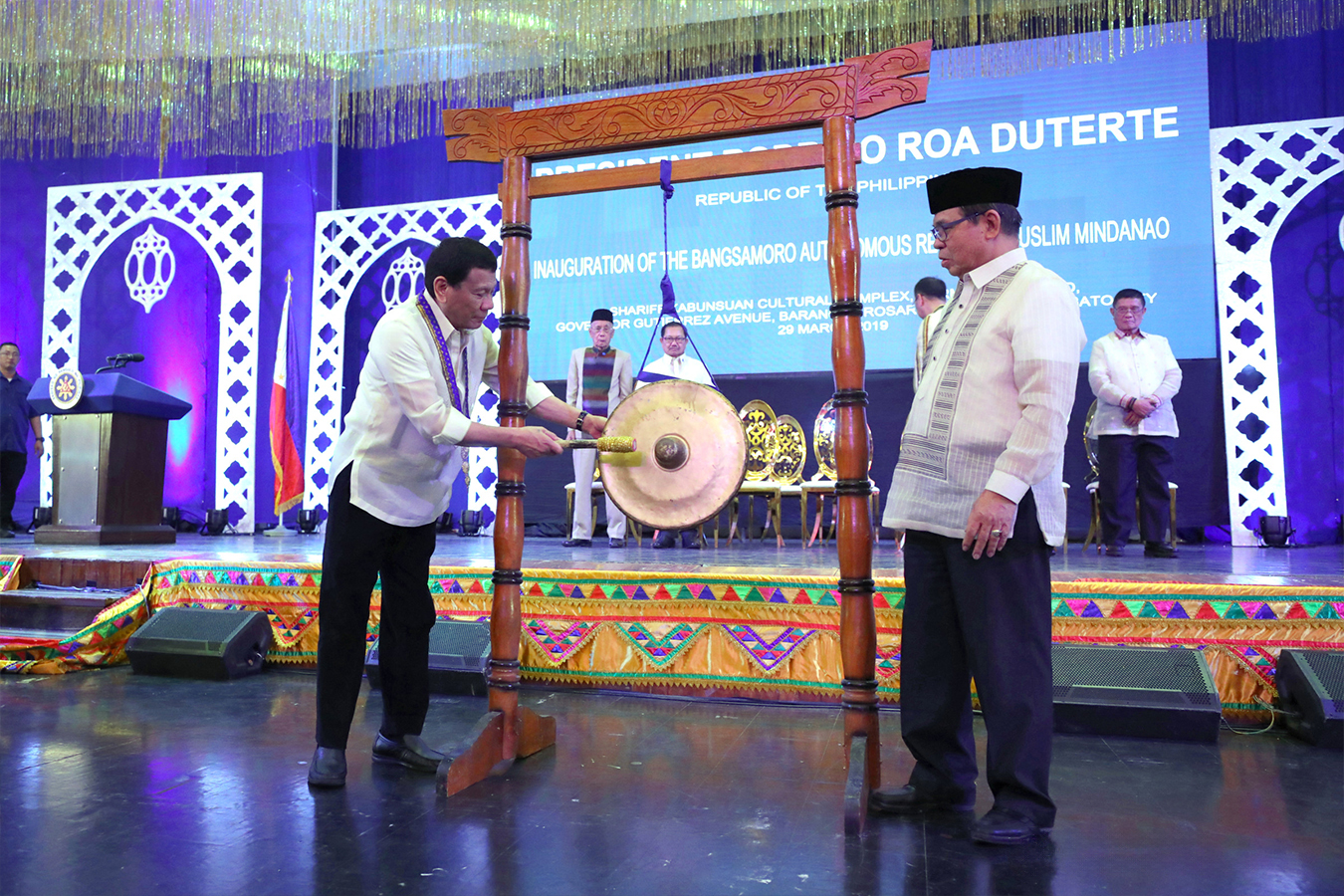
President Rodrigo Duterte sounds the agung during the inauguration of Bangsamoro. He is joined by Chief Minister Murad Ebrahim.

With the ratification of the BOL following the plebiscite on January 21, 2019, the abolition process of the ARMM began, paving way for the setting up of the Bangsamoro autonomous region. Under the BOL, a transitional body, the Bangsamoro Transition Authority (BTA), was organized pending the election of the new region's government officials in 2022. The second part of the plebiscite held on February 6, 2019, expanded the scope of the future Bangsamoro region to include 63 barangays in Cotabato. The members of the BTA took their oaths on February 22, 2019, along with the ceremonial confirmation of the plebiscite results of both the January 21, and February 6, 2019, votes. The official turnover from the ARMM to BARMM took place on February 26, 2019, which meant the full abolition of the former.

The inauguration of BARMM and the inaugural session of the Bangsamoro Parliament took place on March 29, 2019.

Murad Ebrahim took office as the region's first chief minister.

In 2020, the Bangsamoro parliament requested that the BTA be extended for an additional three years past 2022, to allow further time for the transition.

On October 28, 2021, Duterte signed Republic Act No. 11593, postponing BARMM's first regular parliamentary elections from 2022 to 2025. The law also extended the transition period of the Bangsamoro until 2025.

Following a plebiscite on September 17, 2022, Maguindanao was split into two provinces; Maguindanao del Sur and Maguindanao del Norte.

On September 9, 2024, the Supreme Court ruled against the constitutionality of the inclusion of Sulu in BARMM due to the simple majority of residents voting against the province's inclusion in the region during the 2019 Bangsamoro autonomy plebiscite. The status of which administrative region Sulu belongs to is unclear although the Commission on Elections en banc had the consensus that Sulu should revert to the Zamboanga Peninsula, the region it belonged to prior its inclusion in the ARMM back in 1989. Sulu was formally reverted to Zamboanga Peninsula by the virtue of Executive Order No. 91, signed by President Bongbong Marcos on July 30, 2025.

== Administrative divisions ==
=== Provinces ===
Bangsamoro consists of 5 provinces, 3 component cities, 105 municipalities and 2,135 barangays. The city of Isabela, despite being part of Basilan, is not under the administrative jurisdiction of the autonomous region. Likewise, 63 barangays in Cotabato also are part of Bangsamoro as the Special Geographic Area (SGA), despite Cotabato and their respective parent municipalities not being under the administrative jurisdiction of the autonomous region. The barangays were reconstituted into eight municipalities following a plebiscite on April 13, 2024.

Additionally Sulu province was de facto part of Bangsamoro from 2019 to 2024.

Administrative divisions of Bangsamoro

- † Regional center

Province		Capital	Population (2020)^{A}		Area		Density		Cities	Muni.	Bgy.
					km^{2}	sq mi	/km^{2}	/sq mi			
Basilan		Lamitan	10.8%	426,207	1,103.50	426.06	390	1,000	1	11	165
Lanao del Sur		Marawi	30.3%	1,195,518	3,872.89	1,495.33	310	800	1	39	1,159
Maguindanao del Norte		Datu Odin Sinsuat	23.9%	943,500	3,988.82	1,540.09	240	620	1	12	258
Maguindanao del Sur		Buluan	18.8%	741,221	4,973.48	1,920.27	150	390	0	24	287
Tawi-Tawi		Bongao	11.2%	440,276	1,087.40	419.85	400	1,000	0	11	203
Special Geographic Area	†	—	5.5%	215,433	824.31	318.27	260	670	0	8	63
Total				3,944,692	11,935.7	4,608.40	330	850	3	105	2,135
Figures for Basilan exclude the component city of Isabela, which is under the administration of Region IX.; Figures for Maguindanao del Norte include the independent component city of Cotabato.; † 63 barangays of Cotabato province are part of the region.
^A The Philippine Statistics Authority (PSA) used the scope of the former Autonomous Region in Muslim Mindanao as its geographic reference for the 2020 census when it was released on July 7, 2021. Cotabato City and the Special Geographic Area were then not included its population count for Bangsamoro. Statistics for said localities were included in the PSA's count for Soccsksargen. On November 9, 2021, as per PSA Board Resolution No. 13 Series of 2021, Cotabato City and the Special Geographic Area were included in its population count for Bangsamoro and removed from Soccsksargen.

=== Governors and vice governors ===
Province	Governor	Political party	Vice Governor
Basilan	Mujiv S. Hataman	BUP	Hadjiman S. Hataman Salliman
Lanao del Sur	Mamintal Adiong	Lakas	Mohammad Khalid Adiong
Maguindanao del Norte	Tucao O. Mastura	PFP	Datu Marshall I. Sinsuat
Maguindanao del Sur	Ali M. Midtimbang	PFP	Hisham S. Nando
Tawi-Tawi	Yshmael Sali	PFP	Al-Syed Abdulla Sali

== Demographics ==
Marawi Grand Mosque

As per the organic law, the people who "at the advent of the Spanish colonization, were considered natives or original inhabitants of Mindanao and the Sulu archipelago and its adjacent islands, shall have the right to identify themselves, their spouses and descendants" as part of the Bangsamoro people.

The Moro people are an umbrella term for ethnic groups who are mainly Muslim. The Maranaos and Iranun form a large portion of the region's population. The Maguindanaons are the primary population in the Bangsamoro's Special Geographic Area in the Soccsksargen region province of Cotabato. The Tausūg, Yakan and Sama peoples are the main groups in the Sulu archipelago.

There are two other main minority groups which lives in the region among the Moros; the Lumad and the settler communities. There are five main groups under the Lumads, the largest of which are the Teduray. The settlers are primarily Christian which includes various ethnic groups such as the Tagalog, the Ilocanos, the Visayans, the Zamboangueños, and the Chinese.

Population census of Bangsamoro
Year	Pop.	±% p.a.
1918	308,024	—
1939	517,695	+2.50%
1948	677,520	+3.03%
1960	1,167,928	+4.64%
1970	1,466,414	+2.30%
1975	1,484,424	+0.25%
1980	1,648,272	+2.12%
1990	2,234,781	+3.09%
1995	2,509,079	+2.19%
2000	2,966,894	+3.66%
2007	4,379,948	+5.52%
2010	3,527,926	−7.57%
2015	4,080,825	+2.81%
2020	4,944,800	+4.12%
2024	5,691,583	+3.43%
Source: Philippine Statistics Authority

=== Languages ===
The Moro and Lumad speak their native languages. Non-native languages spoken are Ilocano, Chabacano, Hiligaynon, Cebuano, and Tagalog, of which the latter two serve as lingua francas. This is the case for Cebuano because of the mass arrival of Cebuano settlers to Mindanao. Tausug are at ease in speaking Cebuano, because both Tausug and Cebuano are Visayan languages. Chabacano may be the lingua franca of the natives in Sulu Archipelago, along with Tagalog, but it is the main lingua franca in Basilan. Many locals and barter traders in Sulu Archipelago can also speak Sabah Malay (see Malay language in the Philippines).

== Government ==
Between the ratification of the BOL and the inauguration of its first permanent government in 2026, the BTA will head the region. After the ratification of the BOL, the Bangsamoro Transition Commission (BTC) began to transition the ARMM into the BARMM.

=== Organizational structure ===
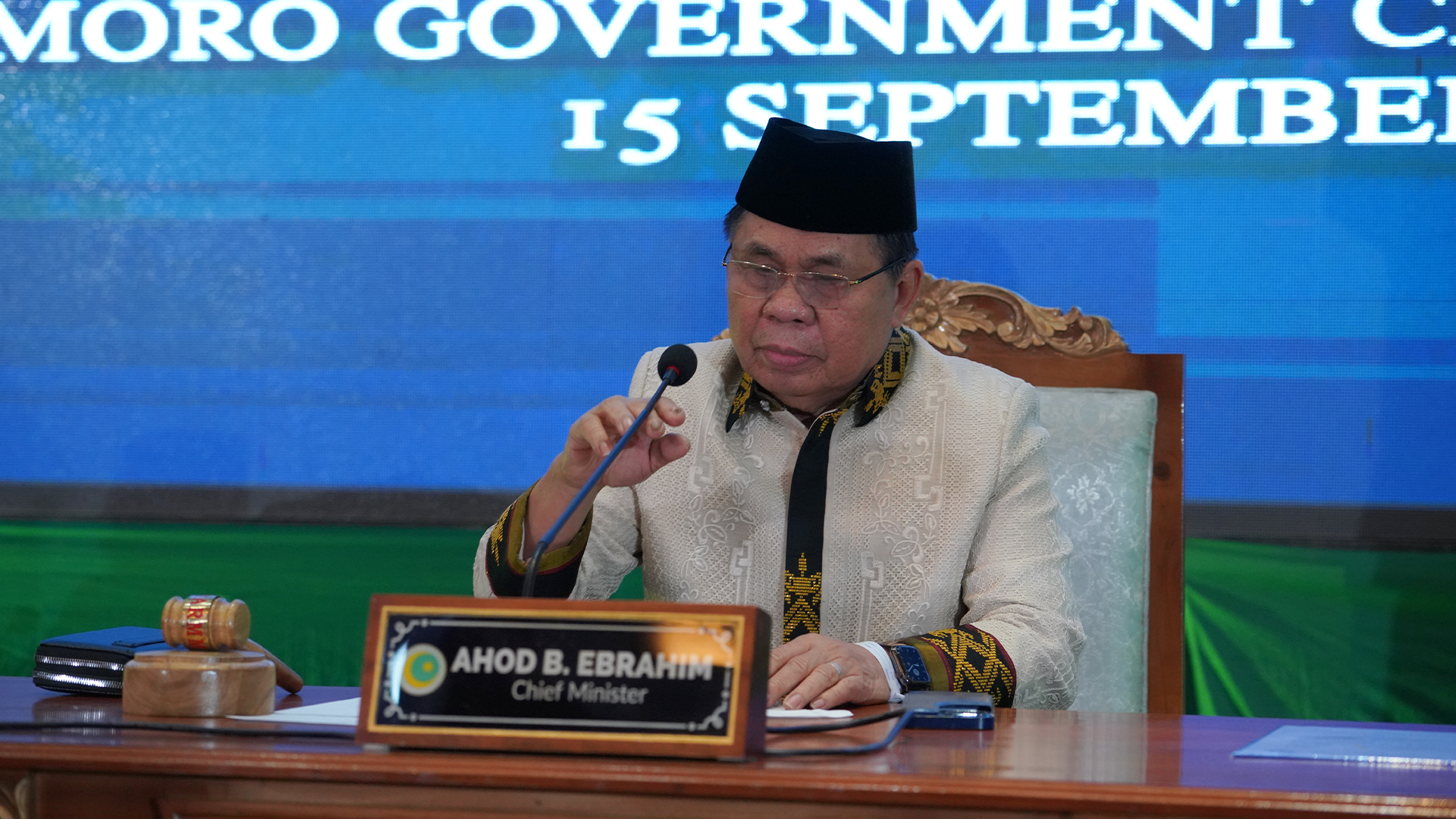
Chief Minister Murad Ebrahim

Based on the organic law, the autonomous Bangsamoro government system is parliamentary-democratic, similar to that practiced in the United Kingdom, a Westminster system which is based on a political party system.

==== Ceremonial ====
The ceremonial head of the region is the wa'lī. The Bangsamoro Parliament selects and appoints the wa'lī. The wa'lī has ceremonial functions and powers such as moral guardianship of the territory and convocation and dissolution of the legislature.

==== Executive ====
The regional government is headed by a chief minister. Murad Ebrahim is the current chief minister, who was appointed by the former Philippine president Rodrigo Duterte, on an interim basis. The interim chief minister is also the head of the BTA, which also serves the function of serving as the transitional Bangsamoro Parliament.

Once the first regular session of the Bangsamoro Parliament is organized come 2026, the chief minister will be elected by the members of the Bangsamoro Parliament from the majority party or coalition holding the most seats won. The chief minister of the Bangsamoro is the chief executive of the regional government and is assisted by a cabinet having a minimum of 10 ministers and two deputy chief ministers. The holder of this position appoints the members of the cabinet, subject to confirmation by Parliament. The chief minister has control of all the regional executive commissions, agencies, boards, bureaus, and offices.

Cabinet
The Bangsamoro Cabinet is composed of two deputy chief ministers and ministers, all appointed among members of the parliament. The deputy chief ministers are selected through nomination of the chief minister and are elected by the members of the Parliament. The ministers in the cabinet on their part are appointed by the chief minister.

Council of Leaders
The Council of Leaders advises the chief minister on matters of governance of the autonomous region. It is roughly an equivalent of an unelected Senate, though only advisory, without legislative powers, and not part of the Parliament.

==== Legislative ====
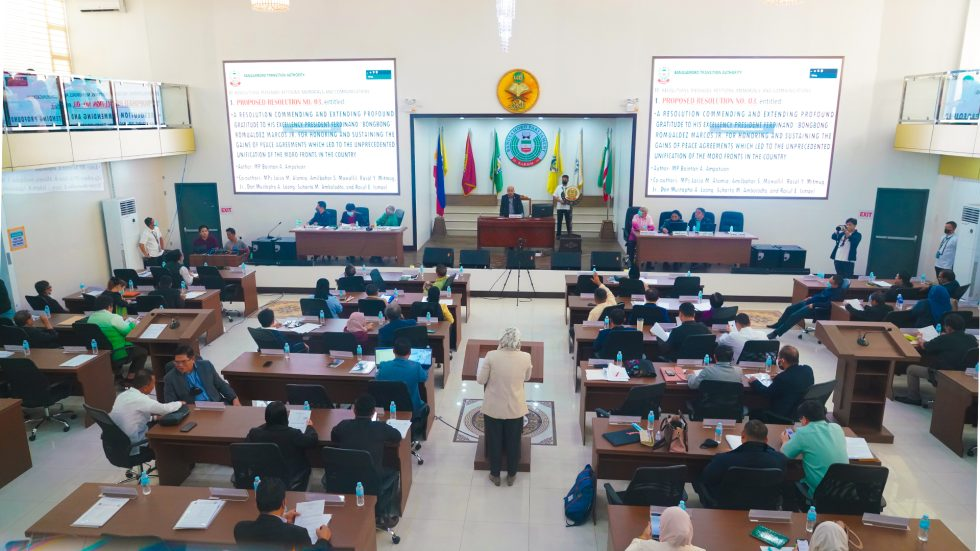
The Bangsamoro Parliament in session.

Under the BOL, the Bangsamoro Parliament serves as the legislature of the autonomous region, mandated to have 80 deputies and is led by the speaker. The wa'lī, a ceremonial head, could dissolve the parliament at his discretion.

Regional ordinances are created by the Bangsamoro Parliament, composed of members of Parliament. Members are meant to be elected by direct vote. Regional elections are planned to be held one year after general elections (national and local) depending on legislation from Congress. The first Bangsamoro regional elections are to be held in 2025. Regional officials have a fixed term of three years, which can be extended by an act of Congress.

Under the BOL, the BTA was organized as a transitional body pending the election of the new region's government officials in 2025, with the first regular session of the parliament to be held in 2025 following the elections.

==== Judiciary ====
The Bangsamoro Autonomous Region has its own regional justice system which applies Shari'ah to its residents like its predecessor, the ARMM. Unlike its predecessor though, the BOL, which became effective as of August 10, 2018, has a provision for the creation of a Shari'ah High Court, which, if and when realized, would consist of five justices including a presiding justice and would oversee appellate courts, district courts, and circuit courts. Non-Muslims could also volunteer to submit themselves under the jurisdiction of Shari'ah law. The Bangsamoro justice system also recognizes traditional or tribal laws but these would only apply to disputes of indigenous peoples within the region.

=== Relation to the central government ===
The Bangsamoro Organic Law provides that BARMM "shall remain an integral and inseparable part of the national territory of the Republic." The Philippine president exercises general supervision over the regional chief minister. The regional government has fiscal autonomy or the power to create its own sources of revenues and to levy taxes, fees, and charges, subject to Constitutional provisions and the provisions of Republic Act 11054. The regional government has to gain approval from the central government's Department of Finance to receive donations and grants from foreign entities.

== Economy ==
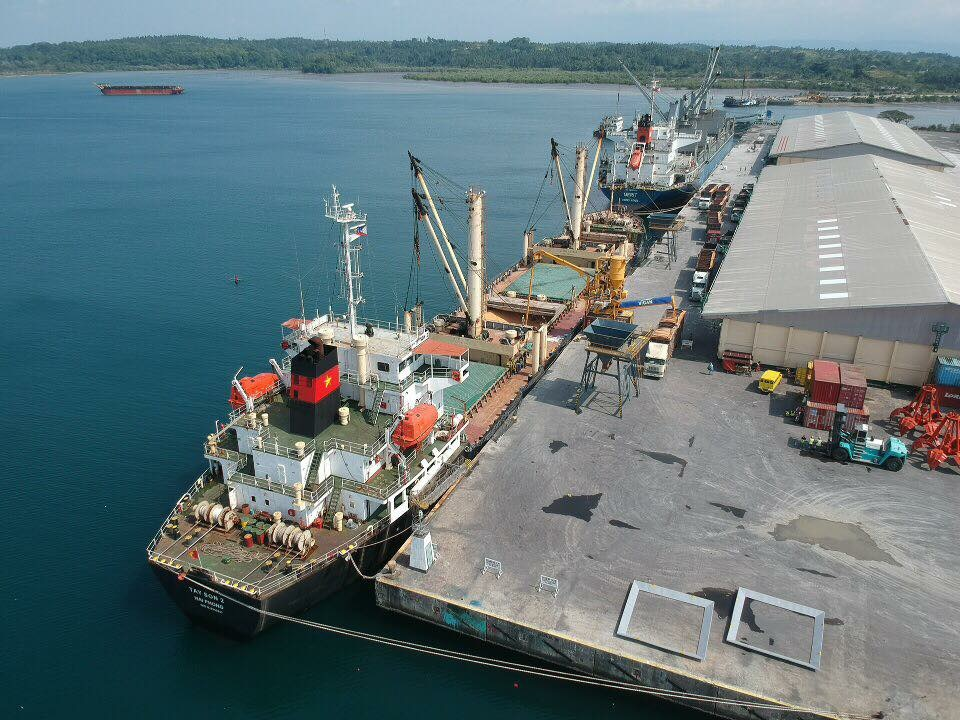
Port of Polloc in Parang, Maguindanao del Norte

Poverty incidence of Bangsamoro (%)

Source: Philippine Statistics Authority

Before the various successes in the Bangsamoro peace processes, economic development in the region had been described as seeing "decades of sluggish economic growth," with much economic activity coming from the informal sector - effectively "shadow economies" which were identified as drivers of conflict.

Three years after the signing of the Comprehensive Agreement on the Bangsamoro and in anticipation of the passage of the Bangsamoro Organic Law, economic growth in the Bangsamoro began to see rapid expansion beginning in 2017.

In 2021, the BARMM recorded regional growth rate of 7.5%, exceeding its pre-pandemic gross domestic product levels, and making it the 2nd fastest growing region in the Philippines for that year. That same year, the Philippine Statistics Authority praised the region for its reduction in poverty incidence citing a 17.4 percent reduction among Philippine regions. The PSA noted that infrastructure projects and peace deals had a significant impact.

== Education ==
The government provides free education at the primary (grade school) and secondary (high school) levels. Some state-run universities / colleges in the region are the Mindanao State University - Marawi (MSU-Marawi), Mindanao State University - Lanao National College of Arts and Trades (MSU-LNCAT), Mindanao State University - Maguindanao (MSU-Maguindanao), Mindanao State University - Tawi-Tawi College of Technology and Oceanography (MSU-TCTO), Basilan State University (BasSU), Tawi-Tawi Regional Agricultural College (TRAC), Adiong Memorial State College (AMSC) and Cotabato State University (CotSU). Private universities / colleges in Bangsamoro region include Notre Dame University (NDU), Sultan Kudarat Islamic Academy Foundation College (SKIAFC), Philippine Muslim Teachers' College (PMTC), Jamiatul Philippine al-Islamia (JPI), Jamiatu Muslim Mindanao (JMM), STI College - Cotabato and AMA Computer University - Cotabato.

== Culture ==
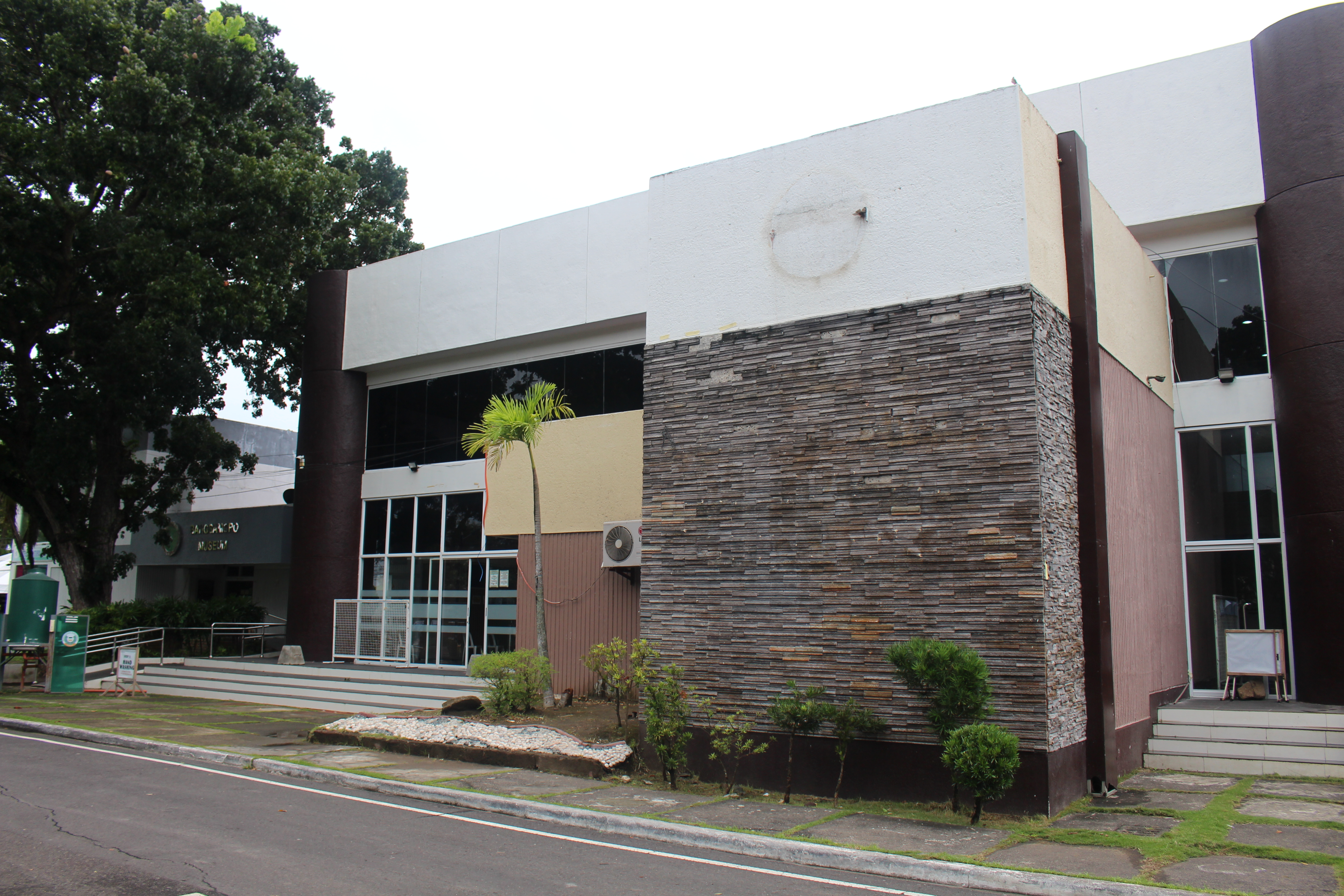
The Shariff Kabunsuan Cultural Complex

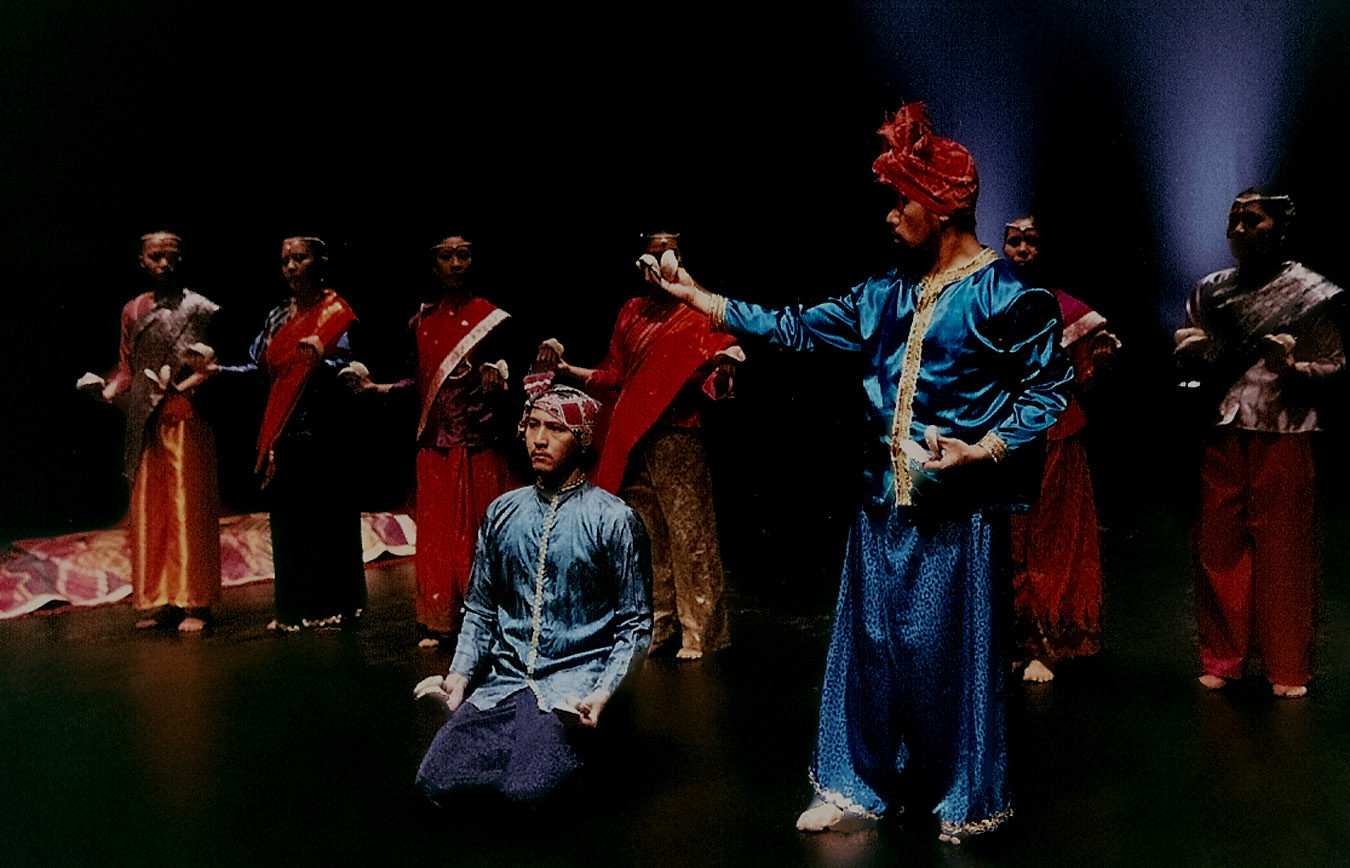
Tausug dancers

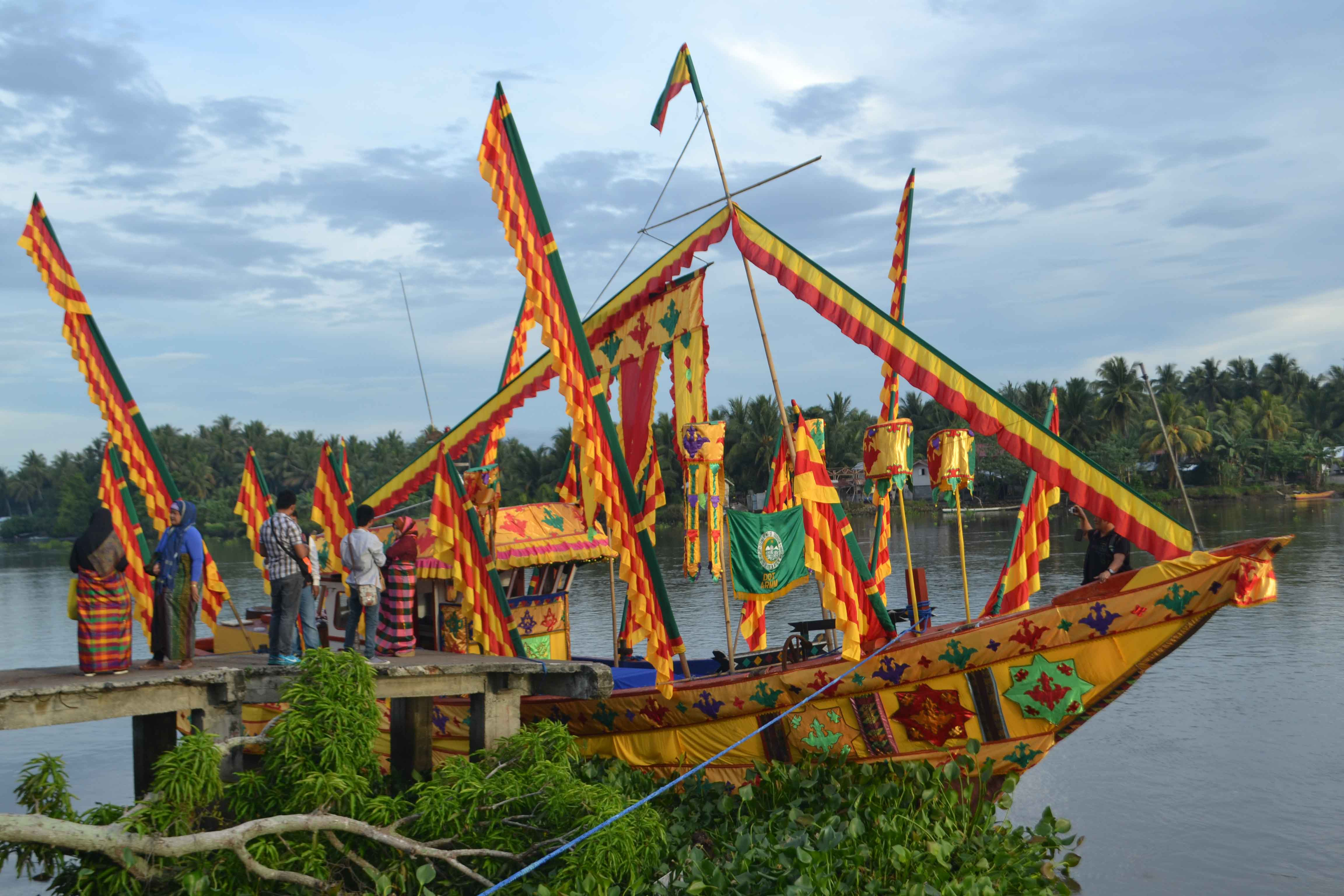
Guinakit Fluvial Parade as part of the Shariff Kabunsuan Festival celebrations.

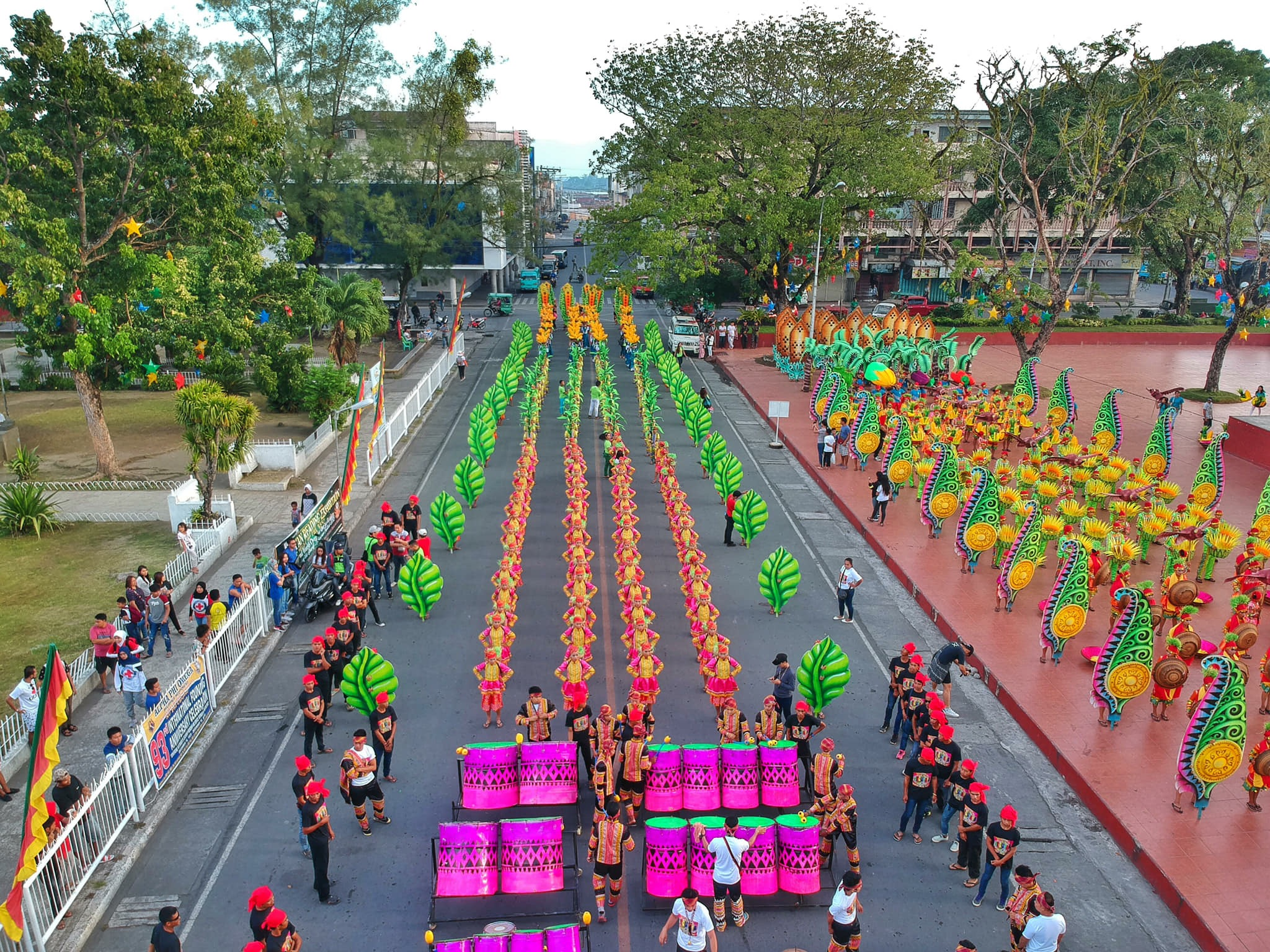
Kuyog Street Dancing Competition, Cotabato City

The people of the Bangsamoro region, including Muslims, Lumads, and Christians, have a culture that revolves around kulintang music, a specific type of gong music, found among both Muslim and non-Muslim groups of the Southern Philippines. Each ethnic group in BARMM also has their own distinct architectures, intangible heritage, and craft arts. A fine example of a distinct architectural style in the region is the Royal Sulu architecture which was used to make the Daru Jambangan (Palace of Flowers) in Maimbung, Sulu. The palace was demolished during the American period after being heavily damaged by a typhoon in 1932, and was never rebuilt. It used to be the largest royal palace built in the Philippines. A campaign to faithfully re-establish it in Maimbung town has been ongoing since 1933. A very small replica of the palace was made in a nearby town in the 2010s, but it was noted that the replica does not mean that the campaign to reconstruct the palace in Maimbung has stopped as the replica does not manifest the true essence of a Sulu royal palace. In 2013, Maimbung was designated as the royal capital of the former Sultanate of Sulu by one of the family claimants to the Sulu Sultanate throne where the pretenders are buried there.

== Natural heritage ==
The region possesses a vast array of natural landscapes and seascapes with different types of environs. The mainland area includes the Liguasan Marsh, a proposed UNESCO tentative site, and Lake Lanao, one of the 17 most ancient lakes in the world. The Sulu archipelago region includes the Turtle Islands Wildlife Sanctuary (a UNESCO tentative site), Bongao Peak, and the Basilan Rainforest.

== Notable people ==
- Ahod "Kagi Murad" B. Ebrahim – Chairman of the Moro Islamic Liberation Front, Chief Minister of the Bangsamoro Autonomous Region in Muslim Mindanao and Party President of United Bangsamoro Justice Party
- Wahab M. Akbar – former political kingpin and dynast, three-term governor, elected congressman in 2007, killed by a bomb blast at the House of Representatives in November 2007.
- Mujiv Sabbihi Hataman – former Anak Mindanao Party-list Representative and Regional Governor (Officer-in-Charge) of the Autonomous Region in Muslim Mindanao (ARMM) from December 2011 until June 2013, appointed by Philippine President Benigno S. Aquino III, after regular elections in August 2011 were postponed to coincide with the Synchronized National and Local elections of May 2013.
- Abdulgani A. Salapuddin – former MNLF commander, schooled at the Sorbonne University in Paris, France, became three-term governor, then three-term congressman, the last two times as the elected Deputy Speaker of the House of Representatives.
- Orlando Quevedo – Cardinal of the Catholic Church, Archbishop of Cotabato
- Noel Felongco – Lead Convenor of National Anti-Poverty Commission
- Imah Dumagay – Stand-up comedian based in Dubai
- Romero Duno – Professional boxer
- Jay Jaboneta – Blogger, philanthropist, media advocate, and online community organizer
- Kublai Millan – Prolific artist
- Ben Farrales – Fashion designer, known for his Muslim-inspired terno designs

== See also ==
- Framework Agreement on the Bangsamoro
- Comprehensive Agreement on Bangsamoro
- Peace process with the Bangsamoro in the Philippines
- Federalism in the Philippines
- Bangsamoro Human Rights Commission
