= List of largest mosques =

This article lists mosques from around the world by available capacity, that belong to any Islamic school or branch, that can accommodate at least 15,000 worshippers in all available places of prayer such as prayer halls (muṣala), courtyards (ṣaḥn) and porticoes (riwāq). All the mosques in this list are congregational mosques – a type of mosque that hosts the Friday prayer (ṣalāt al-jumuʿa) in congregation (jamāʿa).

== List of mosques ==
| Name | Image | Area (m^{2}) | Capacity | City | Country | Year of first building | Denomination |
|---|---|---|---|---|---|---|---|
| Masjid al-Haram | | 400,800 | 4,000,000 | Mecca | Saudi Arabia | Pre-622 | Sunni |
| Prophet's Mosque (Masjid An-Nabawi) | | 384,000 | 1,500,000 | Medina | Saudi Arabia | 623 | Sunni |
| Imam Reza Shrine | | 267,069 | | Mashhad | Iran | 818 | Shia |
| Grand Jamia Mosque | | 200,000 | 800,000 | Karachi | Pakistan | 2023 | Sunni |
| Al-Aqsa | | | 400,000 | Jerusalem | Israel; Palestine (Note: Jerusalem is under Israeli administration, but is claimed by both Israel and Palestine) | Pre-622 | Sunni |
| Faisal Mosque | | 130,000 | 300,000 | Islamabad | Pakistan | 1986 | Sunni |
| Istiqlal Mosque | | 93,200 | | Jakarta | Indonesia | 1978 | Sunni |
| Astana Grand Mosque | | 68,062 | | Astana | Kazakhstan | 2022 | Sunni |
| Jameh Mosque of Makki | | 33,000 | 60,000 | Zahedan | Iran | 1971 | Sunni |
| Badshahi Mosque | Night View of Badshahi Mosque (King’s Mosque) | 28,900 | 100,000 | Lahore | Pakistan | 1673 | Sunni |
| Jamkaran Mosque | | | | Qom | Iran | 984 | Shia |
| Egypt's Islamic Cultural Center (Masjid Misr Al Kabeer) | | | | New Administrative Capital | Egypt | 2023 | Sunni |
| Taj-ul-Masajid | | 23,000 | | Bhopal | India | 1901 | Sunni |
| Djamaa el Djazaïr | | 20,000 | 120,000 | Algiers | Algeria | 2019 | Sunni |
| Hassan II Mosque | | | | Casablanca | Morocco | 1993 | Sunni |
| Umayyad Mosque | | | | Damascus | Syria | 715 | Sunni |
| Grand Jamia Mosque | Side view of Grand Jamia Masjid Bahria Town Lahore | | 70,000 | Lahore | Pakistan | 2014 | Sunni |
| Çamlıca Mosque | | | 63,000 | Istanbul | Turkey | 2019 | Sunni |
| Great Mosque of Samarra | | | 60,000 | Samarra | Iraq | 851 | Sunni |
| Al Jabbar Grand Mosque | | | 60,000 | Bandung | Indonesia | 2022 | Sunni |
| Al-Akbar Mosque | | | 59,000 | Surabaya | Indonesia | 2000 | Sunni |
| Al Saleh Mosque | | 27,300 | 45,000 | Sana'a | Yemen | 2008 | Sunni |
| Baitul Mukarram | | 2463 | 42,000 | Dhaka | Bangladesh | 1959 | Sunni |
| Sheikh Zayed Grand Mosque | | 22,412 | 41,000 | Abu Dhabi | United Arab Emirates | 2007 | Sunni |
| Jamia Masjid | | | 33,333 | Jammu and Kashmir | India | 1400 | Sunni |
| Jamiul Futuh | Jamiul Futuh, The Indian Grand Masjid | | | Kerala | India | 2022 | Sunni |
| Pride of Muslims Mosque | | | 30,000 | Shali | Russia | 2019 | Sunni |
| 1st November of 1954 Great Mosque | | 42,000 | 30,000 | Batna | Algeria | 2003 | Sunni |
| Massalikoul Djinane Mosque | | 10,000 | 30,000 | Dakar | Senegal | 2019 | Sunni |
| Imam Muhammad ibn Abd al-Wahhab Mosque | | | 30,000 | Doha | Qatar | 2010 | Sunni |
| Sabancı Merkez Mosque | | | 28,500 | Adana | Turkey | 1998 | Sunni |
| Great At-Tin Mosque | | | 25,850 | Jakarta | Indonesia | 1997 | Sunni |
| Jama Masjid | | | 25,000 | Central Delhi | India | 1656 | Sunni |
| CHM Masjid Jhelum | | | 25,000 | Jhelum Cantt | Pakistan | 1950 | Sunni |
| Abuja National Mosque | | | 25,000 | Abuja | Nigeria | 1984 | Sunni |
| Selahaddin Eyyubi Mosque | | 43,500 | 25,000 | Diyarbakır | Turkey | 2023 | Sunni |
| Sultan Salahuddin Abdul Aziz Mosque | | | 24,000 | Shah Alam | Malaysia | 1988 | Sunni |
| Jakarta Islamic Centre | | | 20,680 | Jakarta | Indonesia | 1972 | Sunni |
| Al-Azhar Mosque | | | 20,000 | Cairo | Egypt | 972 | Sunni |
| Aqsa Mosque | | | 20,000 | Rabwah | Pakistan | 1972 | Ahmadi |
| Dian Al-Mahri Mosque | | | 20,000 | Depok | Indonesia | 2006 | Sunni |
| Grand Mosque of Conakry | | | 20,000 | Conakry | Guinea | 1982 | Sunni |
| Grand Mosque of West Sumatra | | | 20,000 | Padang | Indonesia | 2014 | Sunni |
| Id Kah Mosque | | | 20,000 | Kashgar | China | 1442 | Sunni |
| Shah Jahan Mosque | | | 20,000 | Thatta | Pakistan | 1659 | Sunni |
| Sultan Qaboos Grand Mosque | | 416,000 | 20,000 | Muscat | Oman | 2001 | Ibadi |
| Tuanku Mizan Zainal Abidin Mosque | | | 20,000 | Putrajaya | Malaysia | 2009 | Sunni |
| Marawi Grand Mosque | | | 20,000 | Marawi | Philippines | 1970 | Sunni |
| Baitul Aman Mosque | | | 20,000 | Barisal | Bangladesh | 2003 | Sunni |
| Great Mosque of Batam | | | 18,500 | Batam | Indonesia | 1999 | Sunni |
| Hagia Sophia | | | 18,000 | Istanbul | Turkey | 1453 (as a mosque) | Sunni |
| Al-Kauthar Mosque | | | 17,000 | Tawau | Malaysia | 1997 | Sunni |
| Al-Fattah al-Aleem Mosque | | | 17,000 | New Administrative Capital | Egypt | 2019 | Sunni |
| Federal Territory Mosque | | | 17,000 | Kuala Lumpur | Malaysia | 2000 | Sunni |
| Grand Mosque of Makhachkala | | | 17,000 | Makhachkala | Russia | 1998 | Sunni |
| Aqsa Mosque | | | 15,000 | Qadian | India | 1876 | Ahmadi |
| Al-Azhom Grand Mosque | | | 15,000 | Tangerang | Indonesia | 2003 | Sunni |
| Emir Abdelkader Mosque | | | 15,000 | Constantine | Algeria | 1994 | Sunni |
| Lal Masjid | | | 15,000 | Islamabad | Pakistan | 1964 | Sunni |
| Kocatepe Mosque | | | 15,000 | Ankara | Turkey | 1987 | Sunni |
| Great Mosque of Central Java | | | 15,000 | Semarang | Indonesia | 2006 | Sunni |
| Grand Mosque of Sabilal Muhtadin | | | 15,000 | Banjarmasin | Indonesia | 1974 | Sunni |
| National Mosque of Malaysia | | | 15,000 | Kuala Lumpur | Malaysia | 1965 | Sunni |
| Putra Mosque | | | 15,000 | Putrajaya | Malaysia | 1999 | Sunni |
| Sultan Haji Hassanal Bolkiah Mosque | | | 15,000 | Cotabato City | Philippines | 2011 | Sunni |
| 201 Dome Mosque | | | 15,000 | Tangail | Bangladesh | 2019 | Sunni |

== See also ==
- Islamic architecture
- Holiest sites in Islam
- Lists of mosques
- List of the oldest mosques
- List of tallest mosques
- List of tallest minarets
