= Al-Azhom Grand Mosque =

Mosque in Tangerang, Banten, Indonesia

Al-Azhom Grand Mosque Masjid Raya Al-A'zhom
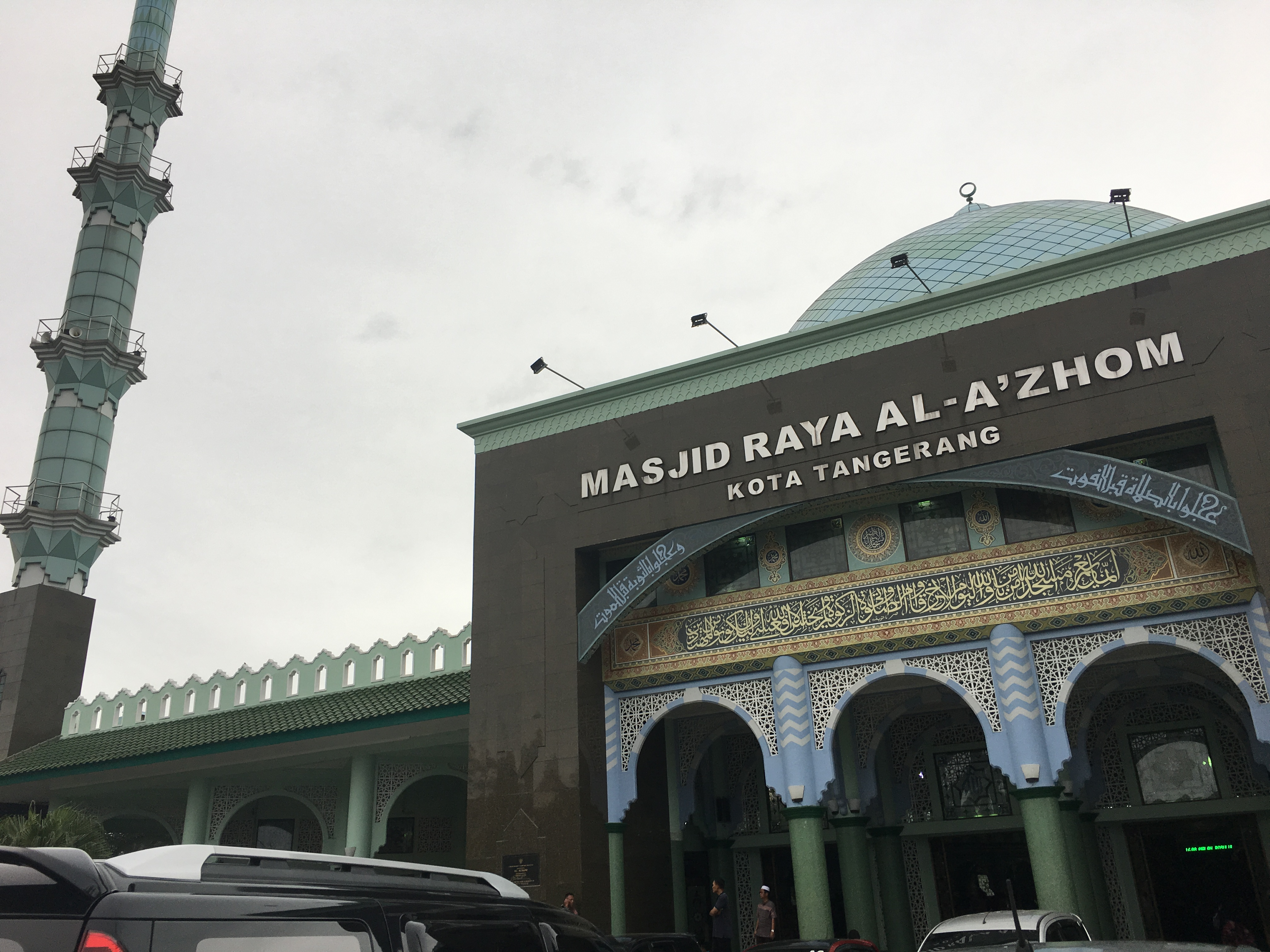

Religion
- Affiliation: Sunni Islam

Location
- Location: Tangerang, Banten, Indonesia
- Interactive map of Al-Azhom Grand Mosque; Masjid Raya Al-A'zhom
- Coordinates: 6°10′11″S 106°38′20″E

Architecture
- Type: Mosque
- Style: Islamic architecture
- Groundbreaking: 1997
- Completed: 2003

Specifications
- Capacity: 15,000
- Dome: 5
- Minaret: 4

Al-Azhom Grand Mosque (Indonesian: Masjid Raya Al-A'zhom) is a congregational mosque in the city of Tangerang, Banten, Indonesia. Opened in 2003, it is the largest mosque in Banten province and one of the largest mosques in the world in terms of the worshipper capacity.

== Description ==
The groundbreaking for this mosque was carried out by the Mayor of Tangerang, Djakaria Machmud, on July 7, 1997. The mosque was inaugurated by the Minister of Religion of the Republic of Indonesia, Said Agil Husin Al Munawar, on February 28, 2003.

The facilities consist of male and female ablution rooms, mihrab and preparation rooms, male/female prayer rooms, study rooms, library rooms, office space, and equipment/mosque yard. The main dome on top is supported by four surrounding semi-circular domes. Because of this architectural combination, there is no need for poles to support the dome, which creates a spacious impression of the prayer space.

== Gallery ==
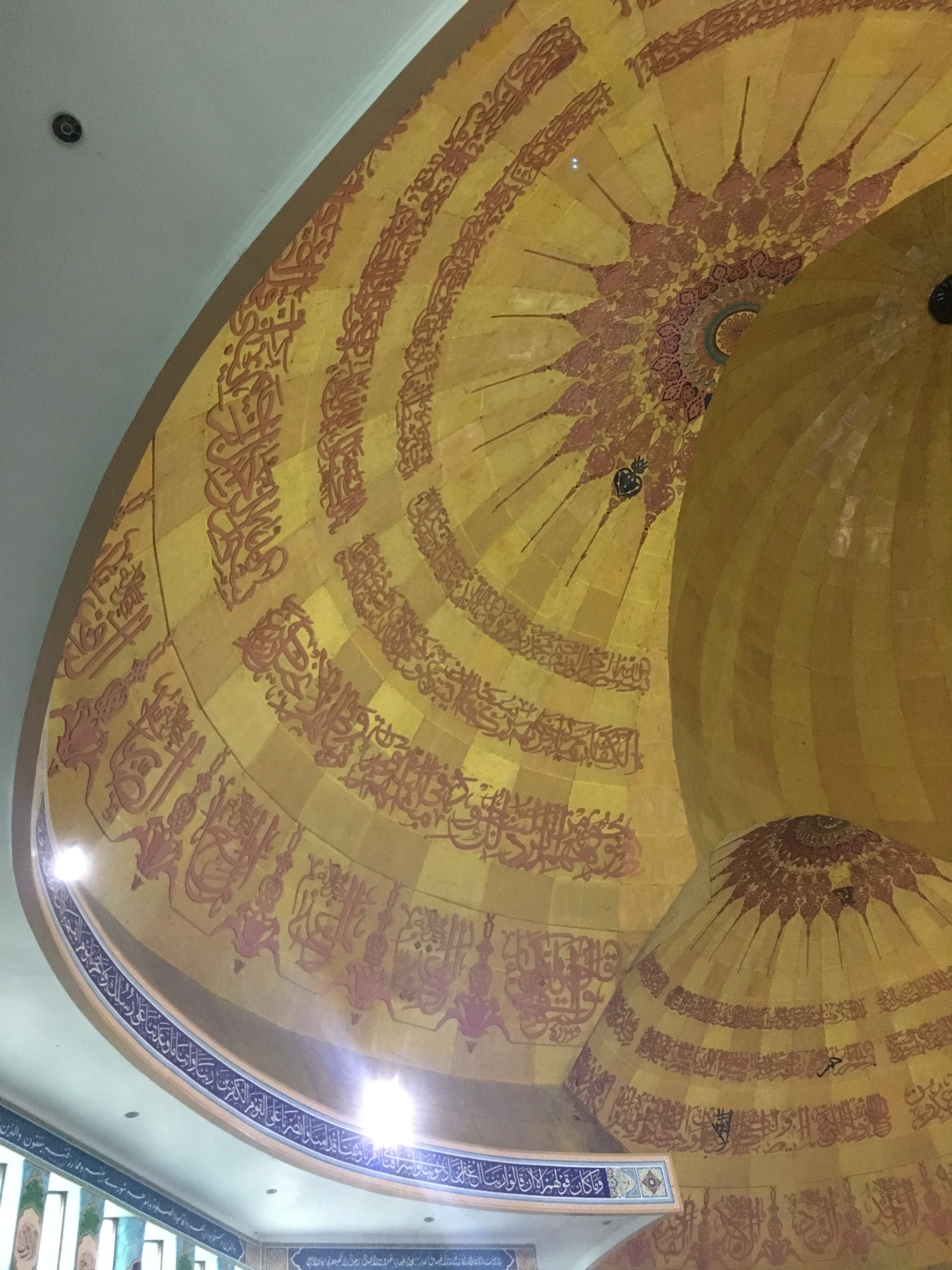
Inner view of the domes

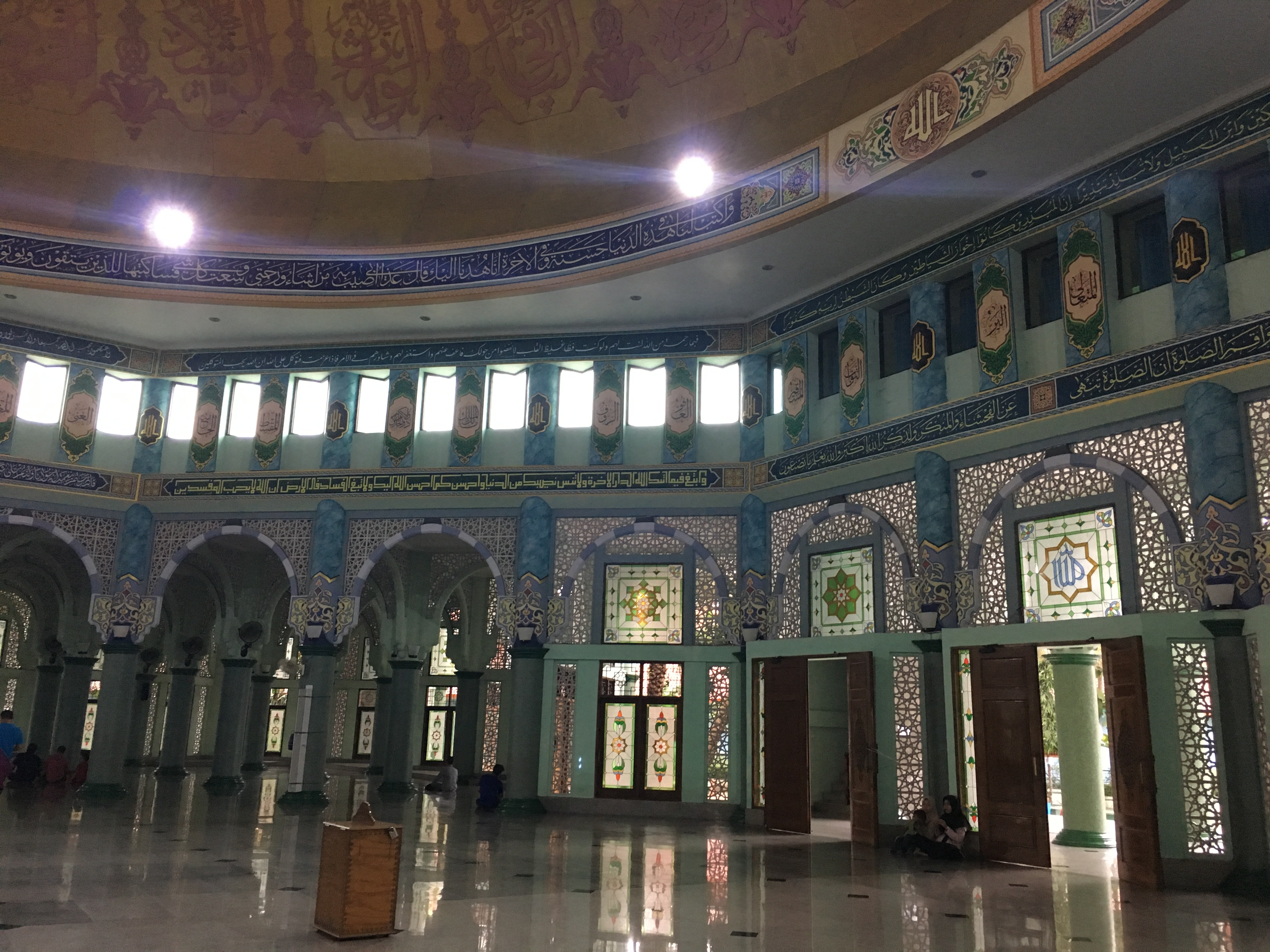
Interior
