= Jay Jaboneta =

Jay Michael Jaboneta
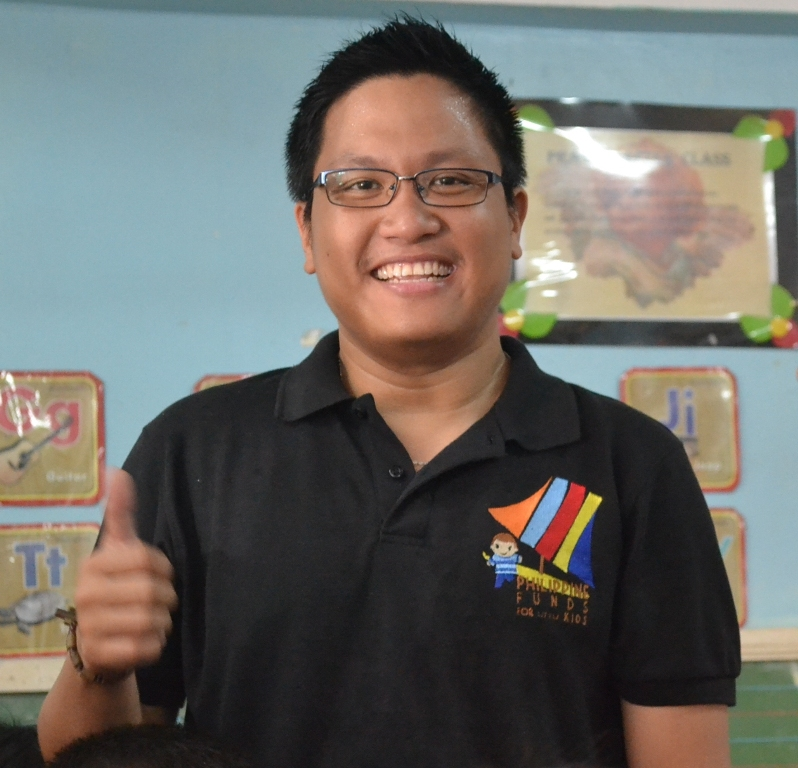
- Jay Michael Jaboneta in 2012
- Born: Jay Michael Ortuoste Jaboneta; September 13, 1981 (age 45); Cotabato City, Philippines
- Education: Ateneo de Davao University
- Occupations: Social Entrepreneur, Blogger
- Organization(s): Yellow Boat of Hope Foundation, Inc.
- Website: http://www.JayJaboneta.com

Jay Michael Ortuoste Jaboneta is a Filipino blogger, philanthropist, new media advocate, and online community organizer, who served as Head for New Media under the Presidential Communications Operations Office of President Benigno Aquino III. Jaboneta is known for having sparked the idea that led to the creation of the charitable organisation Philippine Funds for Little Kids, for which Jaboneta was recognized by Yahoo! Southeast Asia as one of their “7 Modern Day Pinoy Heroes.” In May 2012, The Philippine Funds for Little Kids was incorporated as the Yellow Boat of Hope Foundation, Inc.

Born September 13, 1981, in Cotabato City, Mindanao, Philippines, Jaboneta graduated as valedictorian from high school at Notre Dame of Cotabato in 1998. He earned his BS in commerce with a major in Management Accounting and a minor in Philosophy in 2005 from the Ateneo de Davao University.

Jaboneta began his career in the marketing and sales sector, working for private companies such as Procter & Gamble Philippines, Australia and New Zealand Banking Group, and Metrobank Card Corporation. It was during this time that Jaboneta took an active interest in new media and its impact on the fields of marketing, public relations, and community organizing.

In 2010, he shifted careers to help manage the campaign of lawyer-author-philanthropist Alex Lacson when the latter chose to run in the 2010 Philippine Senate election, under the slate of Liberal Party candidate Benigno Aquino III.

When Benigno Aquino III won the election and became President of the Philippines in June 2010, Jaboneta was tapped to serve as Head of New Media in the newly created Presidential Communications Operations Office.

He first learned about Layag-Layag, an island community in Zamboanga City, in which around 200 elementary school students could only attend school by swimming half a mile to get to the mainland. Jaboneta began a movement he called Zamboanga Fund for Little Kids. Today, the project is formally known the Yellow Boat of Hope Foundation, Inc. (YBH). It states its aim as "to provide access to education for children in remote and poverty-stricken areas by providing boats to reach their schools."

== Awards ==
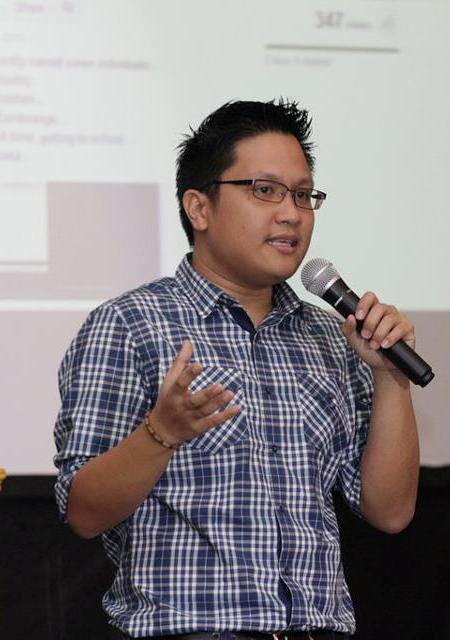
Jaboneta speaking for a leadership seminar.

- The Apex Society Power 30 Under 30 honoree
- Gawad Geny Lopez Jr. Bayaning Pilipino Regional Awardee
- Eton International School 7 Pillars of Hope Award Recipient
- Friedrich Naumann Foundation for Liberty in the Philippines Outstanding Liberal Projects Award Recipient.
- Acumen Fund Global Fellow for the Class of 2013
