= Sultan Haji Hassanal Bolkiah Mosque =

Mosque in Cotabato City, Philippines

- Grand Mosque of Cotabato

Religion
- Affiliation: Islam

Location
- Location: Cotabato City, Philippines
- Interactive map of Sultan Haji Hassanal Bolkiah Mosque
- Coordinates: 7.2019°N 124.1656°E

Architecture
- Architect: Felino Palafox
- Type: Mosque
- Funded by: Sultan Hassanal Bolkiah (partial; 53%)
- Completed: 2011
- Construction cost: US$48 million

Specifications
- Capacity: 15,000
- Minaret: 4
- Minaret height: 43 m (141 ft)

The Grand Mosque of Cotabato, officially the Sultan Haji Hassanal Bolkiah Mosque, is situated in Cotabato City and is the second largest mosque in the Philippines with the capacity to accommodate 15,000 people. The largest mosque in the Philippines is the Marawi Grand Mosque in Marawi City which consists of three floors and a basement, and a total floor area of 9,434 square meters and has a capacity to accommodate 20,000 worshipers at any given time. The Bolkiah mosque is located in Barangay Kalanganan II in Cotabato City. It is also the 61st biggest mosque in the world and the third largest mosque in Southeast Asia after the Istiqlal Mosque of Indonesia and the Marawi Grand Mosque.

== Construction ==
The mosque was erected in 2011 with the building's construction reportedly costing US$48 million. Around 53% of the construction cost was partly funded by Sultan Hassanal Bolkiah of Brunei, after whom the mosque has been named, while the rest was funded by the administration of President Noynoy Aquino. The construction work was done by Manila-based firm New Kanlaon Construction, Inc. with Richard Harris Jordan as project manager. The mosque is 99.12% complete by April 2011. 300 workers were hired for the construction of the mosque.

It was built on a lot donated by former Maguindanao First District Representative Didagen Dilangalen.

== Architecture and design ==

Right side

The Sultan Haji Hassanal Bolkiah Mosque was designed by local architecture firm Palafox Associates of Felino Palafox. The mosque's domes are painted in gold and their tips are adorned by crescent moons. The building's minarets stands 43 meters (141 ft) high and is lit at night which serves as a guide for aircraft pilots flying near the area. The building itself occupies an area of 5,000 square meters (54,000 sq ft) or half a hectare on a five hectare lot.

== Management ==
The mosque is managed and operated by the Bangsamoro regional government. Prior to this the entity responsible for its management has been disputed, with claims that either the local government of Cotabato City or the defunct Autonomous Region in Muslim Mindanao (ARMM) should manage the religious site. The dispute prompted the national government to temporarily take over the mosque's management except fund allocation for the building's maintenance which has been taken care of by nearby residents. In November 2019, the national government has offered to cede its role of managing the mosque to the Bangsamoro regional government which succeeded the ARMM in the first quarter of the same year as part of the transition process. The mosque was officially turned over to the Bangsamoro regional government on January 8, 2020.

== See also ==
Birds-eye view of mosque

- Islam in the Philippines
- Masjid Al-Dahab
