= Imah Dumagay =

Filipina stand-up comedian

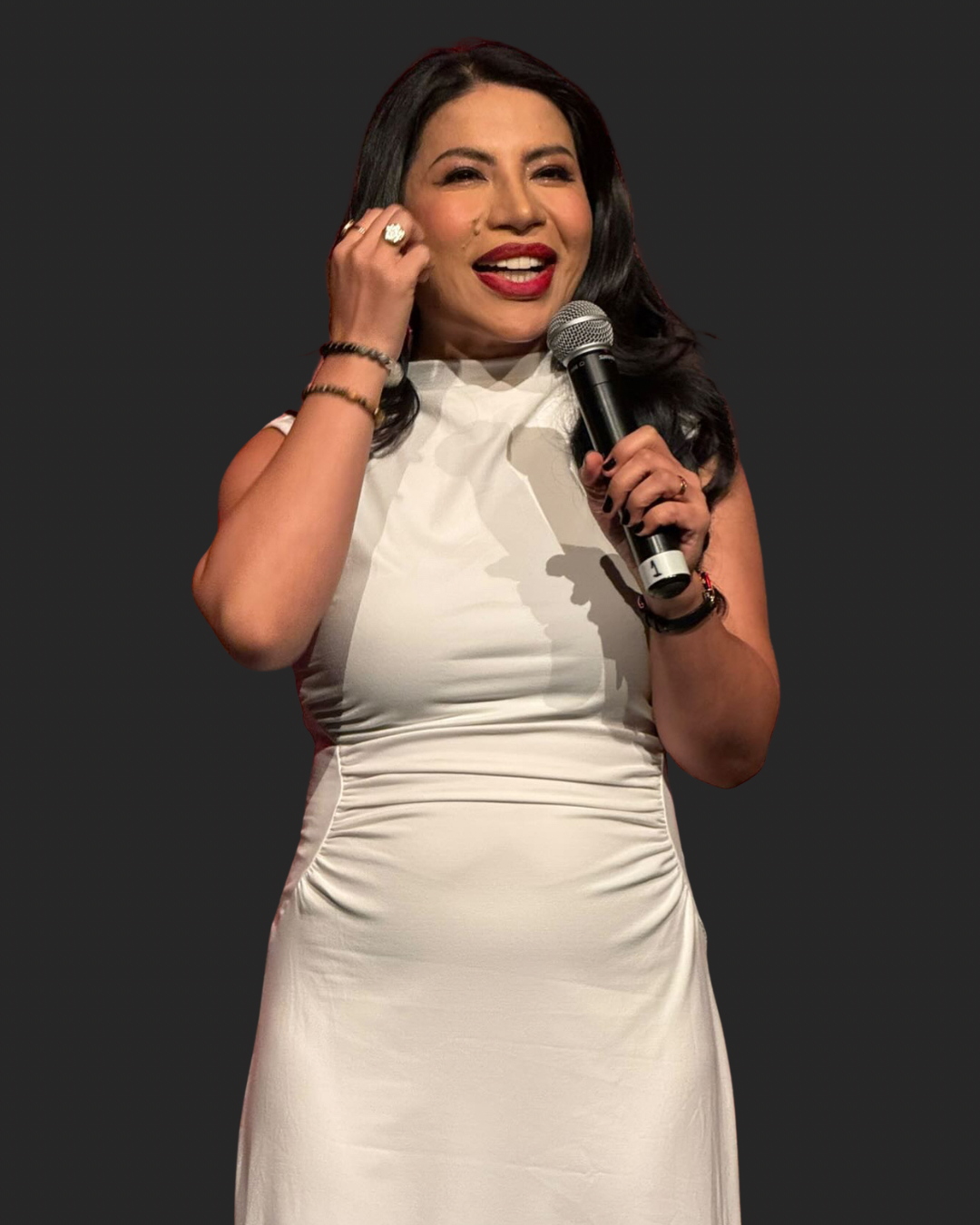
- Born: April 26; Cotabato City, Philippines

Comedy career
- Medium: Stand-up
- Genres: observational humor; anecdotal; self-deprecating

Imah Dumagay is a Filipina stand-up comedian based in Dubai, United Arab Emirates. She has been described by regional media as the first Filipina to establish an English-language stand-up comedy career in the Gulf region. Her comedy often draws on cultural stereotypes and the experiences of overseas Filipino workers in the Middle East. She began performing stand-up comedy in 2018 and later co-founded Comedy Kix in Dubai .

== Early life and background ==
Imah Dumagay was born and raised in Cotabato City, in the southern Philippines. In 2008, she moved to Dubai to pursue opportunities abroad. For about a decade, Dumagay worked in Dubai’s corporate sector – including a stint as an accountant and as an executive assistant to a chief financial officer at one of Dubai's property developer. She also held roles in advertising and banking during these years.

== Career ==
=== Comedy beginnings ===
In 2018, after taking acting, stage monologue and comedy workshops, Dumagay began performing at open-mic nights in Dubai. In 2019, she co-founded Comedy Kix with comedian Amr Elassal, where they began hosting regular comedy shows.

Early in her career, Dumagay performed on bills that included Zakir Khan, Eric Omondi, Bovi, Kenny Blaq, Eddie Kadi and Basketmouth. She also performed with UAE-based comedians including Mina Liccione, Ali Al Sayed and Nitin Mirani. By 2019, Dumagay was performing regularly at comedy venues in Dubai. And in March 2019, she opened for Axel Blake in Dubai.

During the COVID-19 pandemic, when live events were restricted, Dumagay began producing comedy content online.

=== Solo shows and later career ===
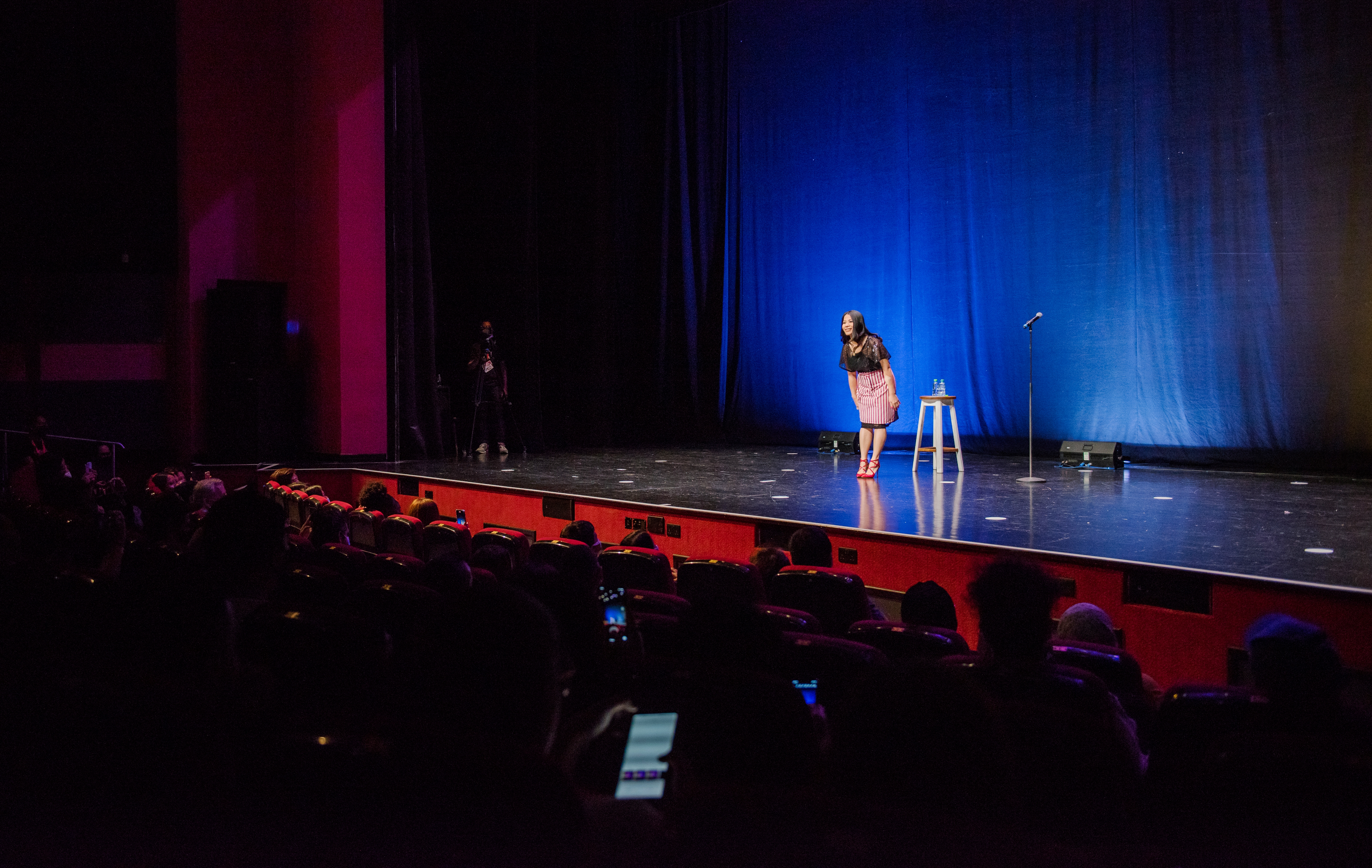
IMAH'S DAY OFF at The Theatre, MOE (now New Covent Garden), 27 November 2020

On November 27, 2020, Dumagay staged her first solo stand-up show, Imah’s Day Off, at The Theatre at Mall of the Emirates in Dubai (now New Covent Garden Theatre). The show sold out.., making her the first Filipina in the region to headline a full-length English stand-up comedy show. Her second solo show, The Shelarious Imah, was staged at the same venue in March 2021. In May 2021, Dumagay performed at the Dubai Comedy Festival., becoming the first Filipino act to appear in the city's high-profile comedy event. She has since become a regular of the festival, appearing in its annual lineups from 2021 onward.

In August 2021, the Associated Press profiled Dumagay and reported on her comedy career in Dubai, particularly her material about the experiences of overseas Filipinos in the Middle East.

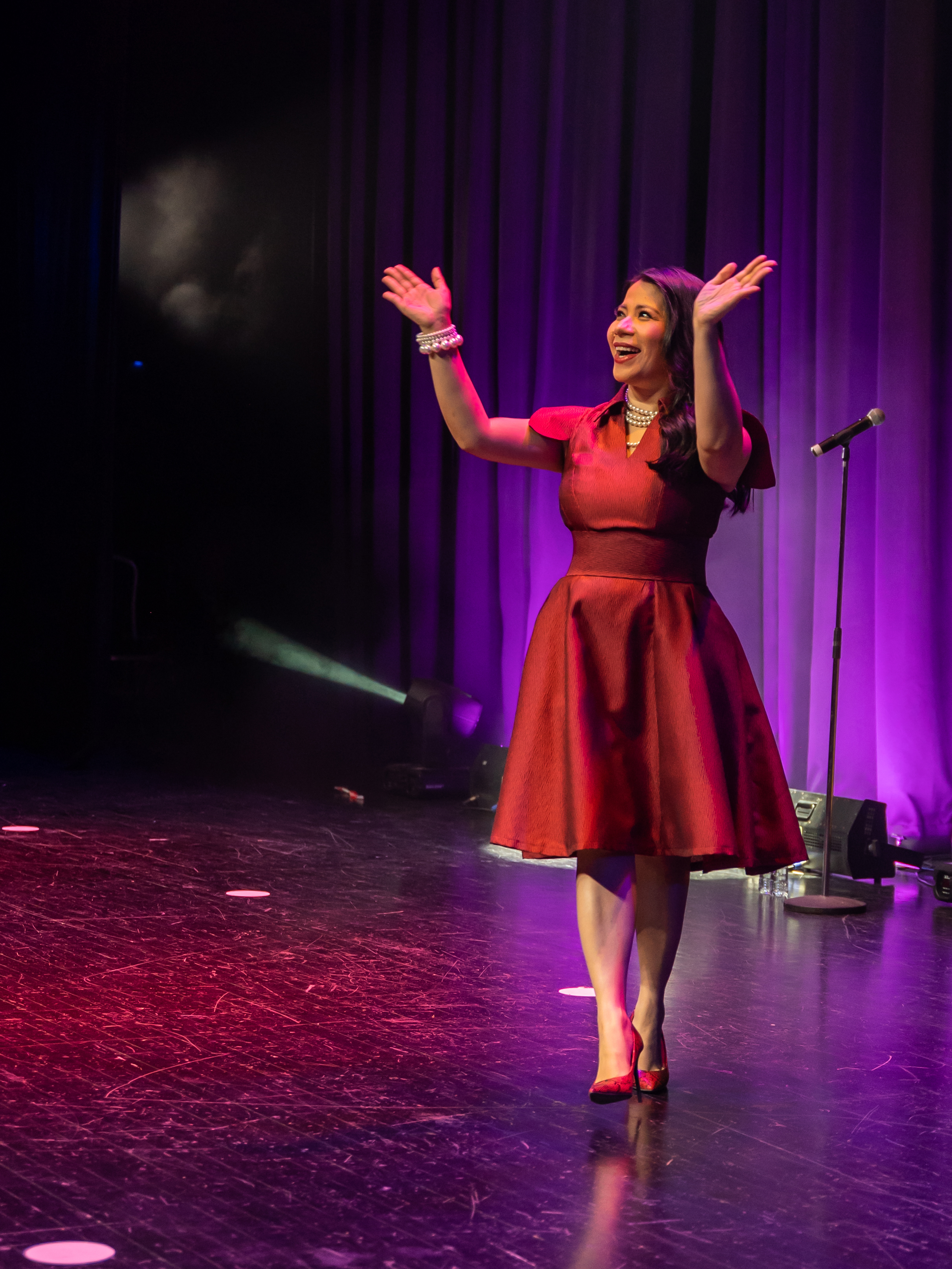
IMAH: A DOSE OF LAUGHTER at The Theatre, MOE - 2 September 2021

In September 2021, Dumagay staged IMAH: A Dose of Laughter at The Theatre at Mall of the Emirates..

In February 2022, she was featured on Radio France Internationale’s (RFI) cultural program Vous m’en direz des nouvelles, where she was recognized as a pioneering figure in Dubai’s stand-up comedy scene. Later in 2022, television network TV5Monde profiled her in its magazine show Maghreb-Orient Express, airing a behind-the-scenes report on her new comedy special, "Make Laugh With Imah", and noting that she was one of the few comedians in the United Arab Emirates able to earn a living from stand-up.

In October 2022, Dumagay was awarded a 10-year UAE Golden Visa, becoming one of the first comedians in the country to receive the long-term residency.

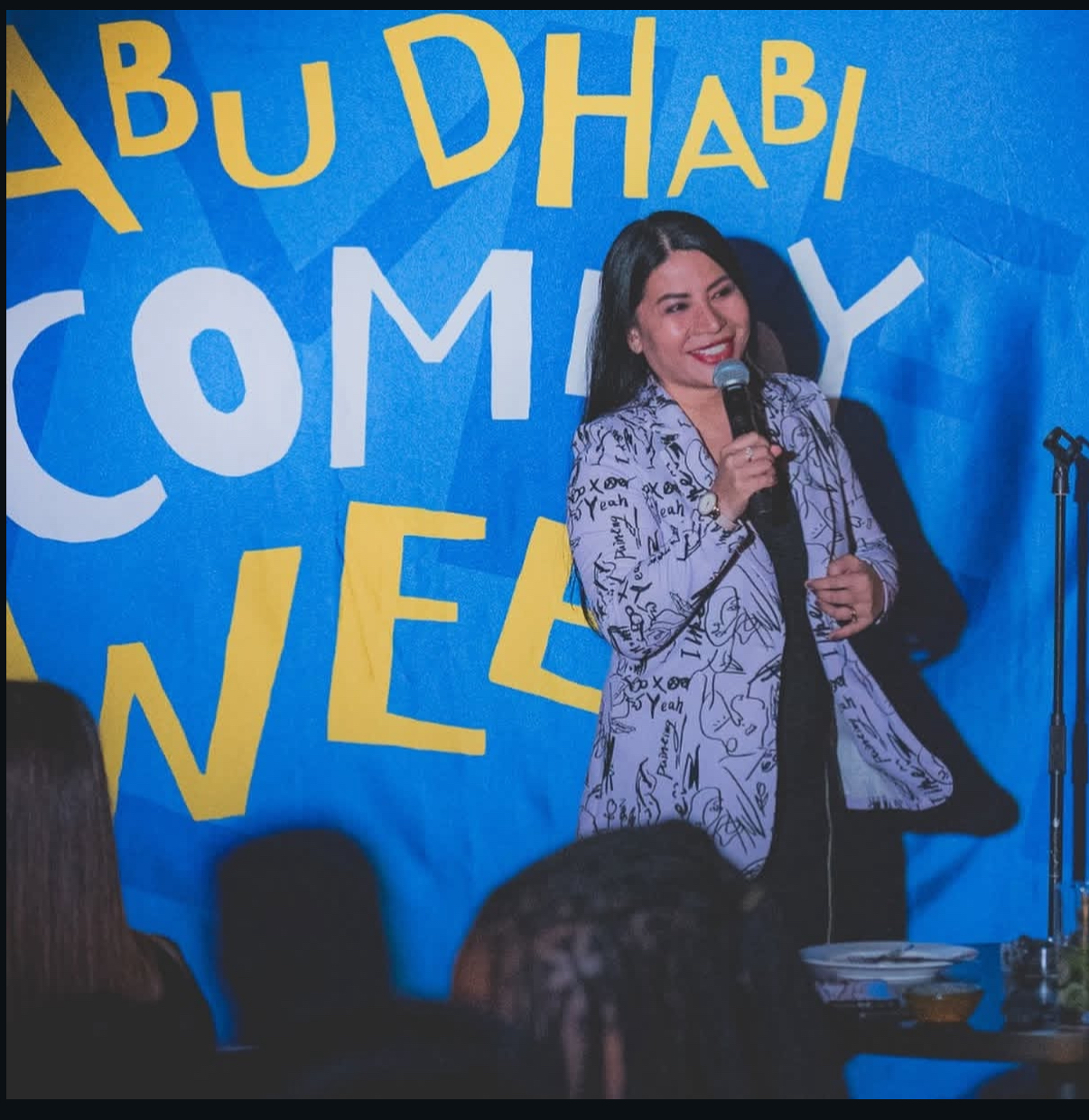
IMAH at her Abu Dhabi Comedy Week performance

In September 2023, Dumagay toured the Gulf with Filipino comedians Alex Calleja and Andrew Orolfo in the Funny Filipinos shows, with performances in Bahrain, Oman and Dubai.,

In 2024, Dumagay performed at the inaugural Abu Dhabi Comedy Week.

Dumagay continues to perform at Comedy Kix shows and other comedy events in the UAE. In February 2022, she also performed in Manila in a show with Alex Calleja, making it her first ever performance in the Philippines

== Awards and recognition ==
- 2022 - TAG Choice Awards, Favorite Pinoy Local Performer.
- 2022 - Emirates Influencer Award
- 2025 - Named among the TOFA100 honorees at The Outstanding Filipino Awards.

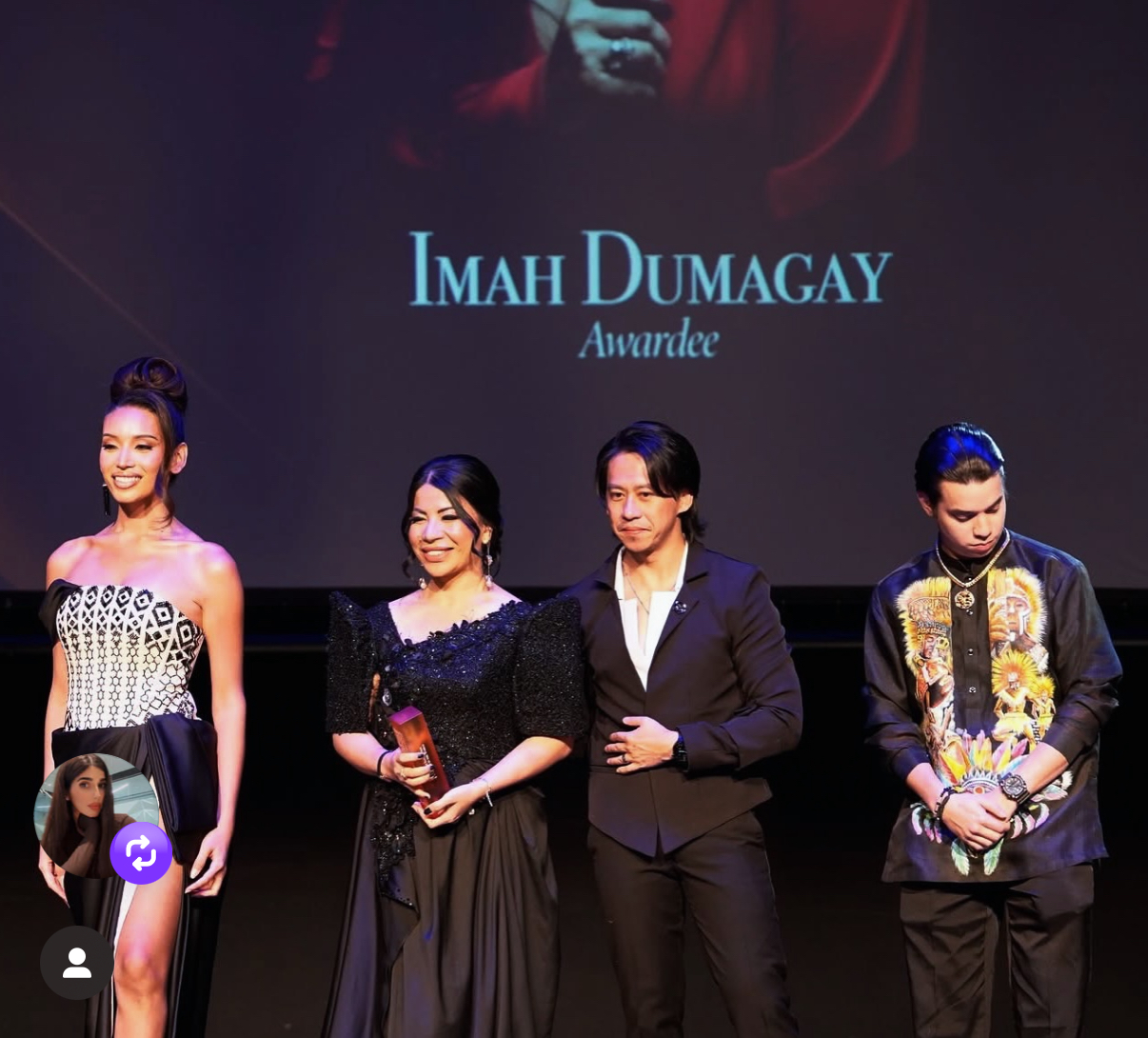
Imah Dumagay awarded at TOFA's 100 Most Influential Filipinos In The World
