= Marawi Grand Mosque =

Mosque in Lanao del Sur, Philippines

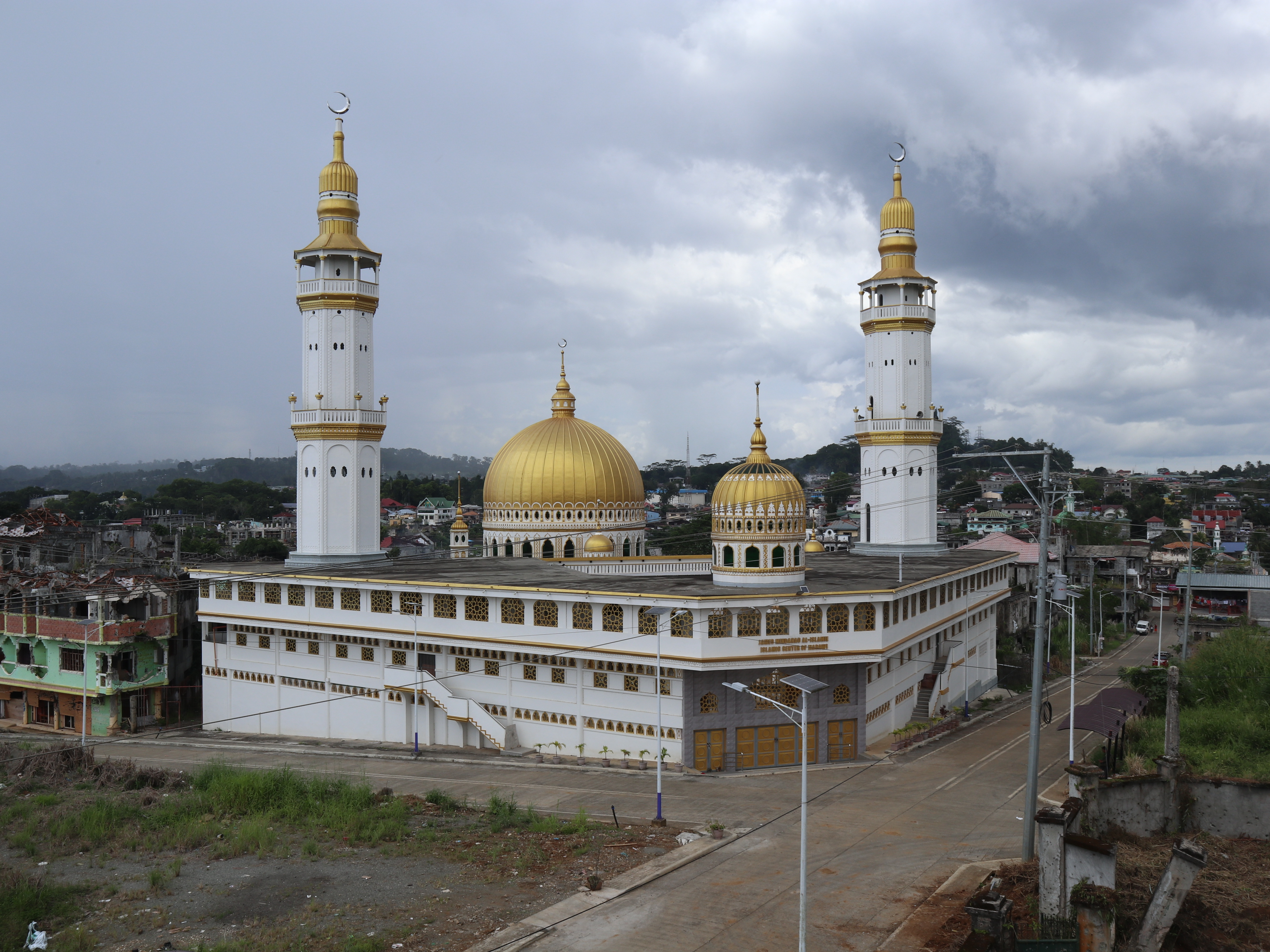
- The mosque in 2023

- Location within Mindanao mainland Location within Philippines

Religion
- Affiliation: Islam

Location
- Location: Marawi City, Lanao del Sur, Bangsamoro
- Country: Philippines
- Administration: Jameo Mindanao Al‑Islamie, Islamic Center of Marawi
- Coordinates: 8°00′02″N 124°17′35″E

Architecture
- Completed: 1970
- Capacity: 20,000

The Marawi Grand Mosque, also known as the Islamic Center of Marawi, is a mosque located in Pangarungan Village, Marawi City, Lanao del Sur, Philippines.

== History ==
=== Establishment ===
The first phase of the mosque's development was in the 1950s which was completed in 1970. The implementation was led by the site's landowner Datu Pangarungan Disalongan with funding coming from local-based private individuals and some foreign donors. Foreign ministers and diplomats from the Organisation of Islamic Cooperation often made stopovers in the mosque when making official visits to Marawi.

=== Battle of Marawi ===
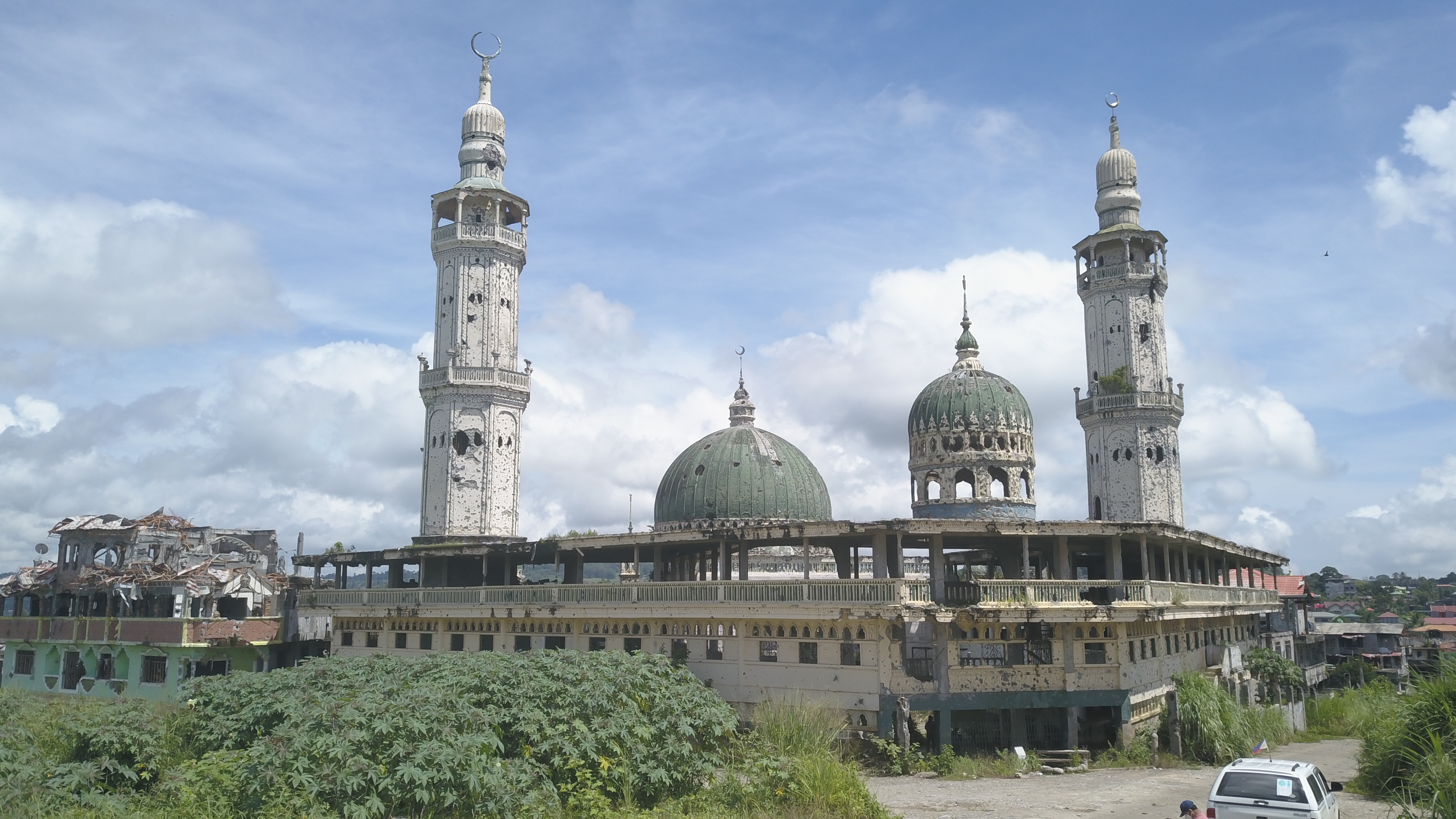
The mosque in 2020, damaged due to the Marawi siege of 2017.

During the siege of Marawi in May 2017, the mosque was among the structures captured by ISIS affiliated Maute group militants. Philippine government forces regained control of the city but several structures including the grand mosque were left heavily damaged after the battle.

=== Post-siege ===
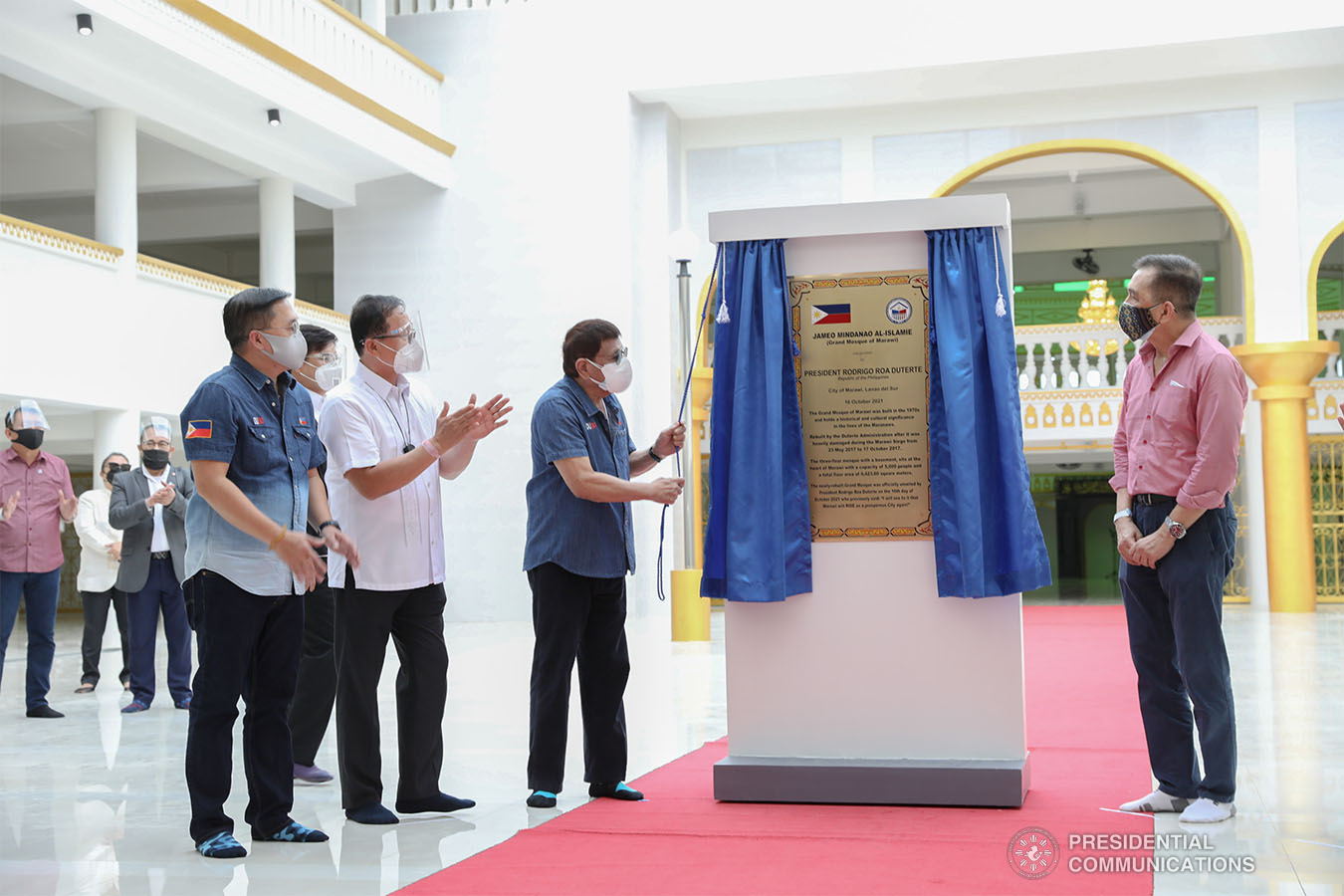
President Rodrigo Duterte (center) leads the inauguration of the Jameo Mindanao Al-Islamie (Grand Mosque) in Marawi on October 16, 2021.

On September 8, the first Salahtul Jumaah was held since the liberation of Marawi. Task Force Bangon Marawi, a government agency planning to reconstruct and repair about 31 mosques in Marawi damaged during the siege, planned to start repair works on the Grand Mosque in August 2020. It was completed by October 2021 and inaugurated by President Rodrigo Duterte in the presence of Secretary Saidamen Pangarungan of the National Commission on Muslim Filipinos, Lanao del Sur governor Mamintal Adiong Jr., and Marawi city mayor Majul Gandamra.

On December 2, 2021, the rebuilt Grand Mosque was turned over by Secretary Eduardo Del Rosario, Task Force Bangon Marawi, to Hadji Abdul Amai Manabilang Pangarungan and NCMF Secretary Saidamen B. Pangarungan, President and chairman, respectively of the Marawi Grand Mosque.

== Facilities ==
The Marawi Grand Mosque has three floors and a basement and has a total floor area of 9,434 m^{2} (101,550 sq ft) square meters. It has the capacity to accommodate 20,000 worshippers at any given time, and is considered to be the biggest Islamic place of worship in the Philippines. Prior to the 2017 Marawi siege the mosque covered an area of 2,500 m^{2} (27,000 sq ft), had three floors, and a capacity to accommodate 5,000 people. Ran by the Jameo Mindanao Al–Islamie, Islamic Center of Marawi, the structure also hosts a madrasa and a library.
