= Voice FM =

Voice FM may refer to:

- Voice FM 99.9, a radio station in Ballarat, Australia
- Voice FM (Cotabato), a radio station in Cotabato, Philippines
- Voice FM Antique, a radio station in San Jose de Buenavista, Philippines
- Voice FM 103.9, a radio station in Southampton, UK
- The Voice (North Devon), a radio station in North Devon, UK
