= Tamontaka Church =

Latin Catholic church in Cotabato City, Philippines

- Church of the Immaculate Concepcion
- Simbahan ng Tamontaka (Filipino)
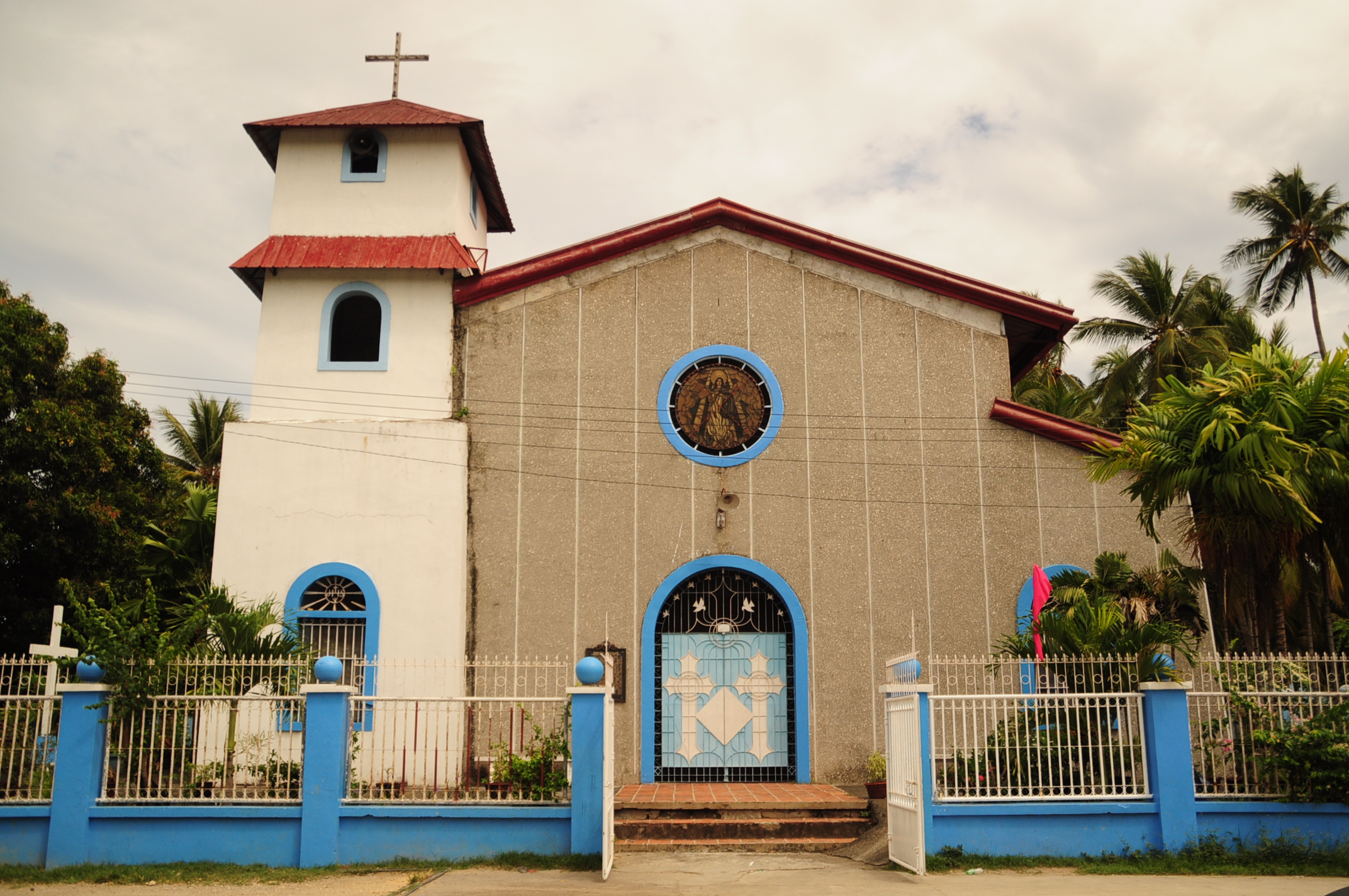
- Church façade in 2018

- Location in Mindanao Location in the Philippines
- 7°11′01″N 124°13′20″E
- Location: Cotabato City
- Country: Philippines
- Denomination: Catholic
- Religious order: Society of Jesus (until 1939); Oblates of Mary Immaculate (since 1939)

History
- Founded: 1872
- Dedication: Mary, Mother of Jesus (as the Immaculate Conception)
- Consecrated: 1872

Architecture
- Functional status: Active
- Architectural type: Church building
- Completed: 1978 (current building)

The Church of the Immaculate Concepcion, commonly known as Tamontaka Church, is a Latin Catholic church in Cotabato City, Philippines.

The church was established by Jesuit priests as part of the Tamontaka Mission which focused on the youth as well as the evangelization of people in the Cotabato region in the late 19th century. The original church structure was built in 1872 along the Tamontaka river. Two schools one exclusively for boys and another for girls were established. The former was managed by the Society of Jesus and the latter was run by the Beatas de la Compania de Jesús (now the Religious of the Virgin Mary). The church was moved to its present site in 1879. The Jesuits of Zamboanga took over the establishment in 1899.

In 1939, the church became part of the Cotabato mission of the Oblates of Mary Immaculate. The church building was destroyed in an earthquake on August 17, 1976, and was rebuilt after two years. The building sustained damage in a fire on May 11, 1994, and was repaired within a year. The church was declared a National Historic Landmark on July 19, 2004.

The church is connected to a catacomb through a tunnel. The tunnel itself is part of a network of caves connected to the Pedro Colina Hill.

Church NHI historical marker installed in 2004
