= Kutawato Caves =

Cave in Cotabato City, Philippines

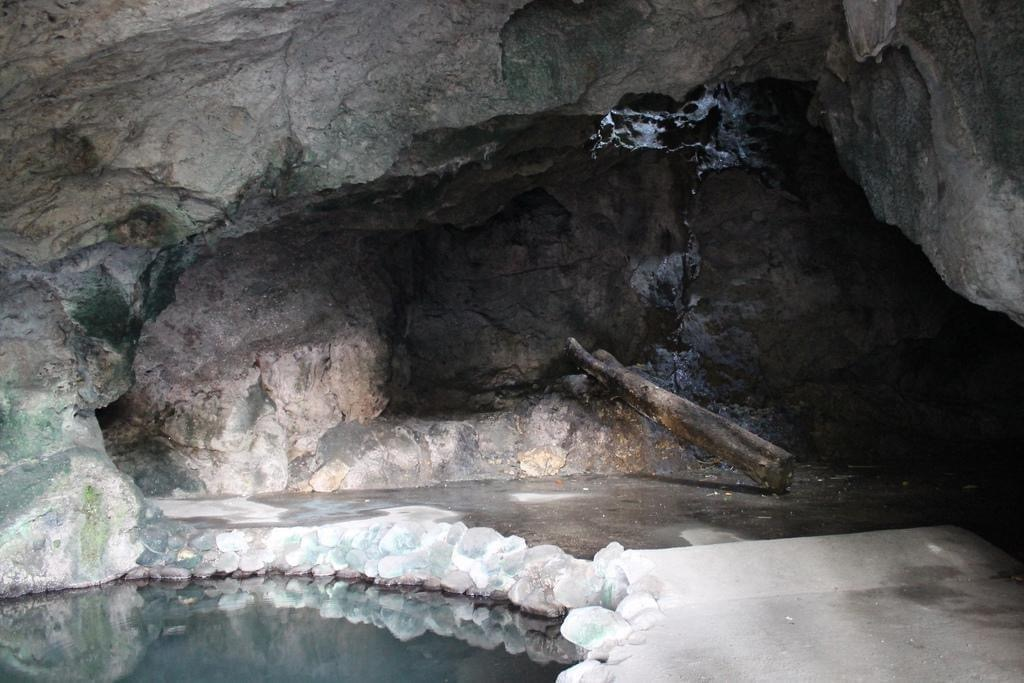
- Inside the Kutawato Cave

- Location within Philippines
- Location: Cotabato City, Maguindanao; Philippines
- Coordinates: 7°13′11.04″N 124°14′30.47″E
- Geology: Limestone formation
- Entrances: Four
- Difficulty: Easy
- Hazards: Wet cave floor
- Access: Public

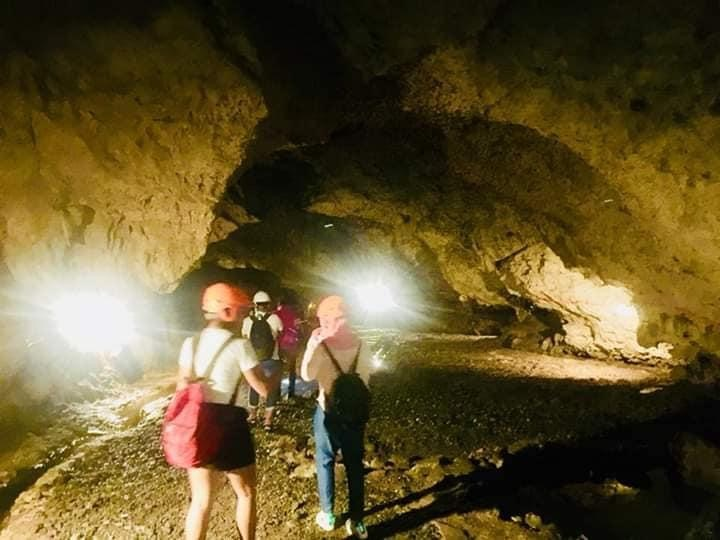
Spelunking activity in Kutawato Cave

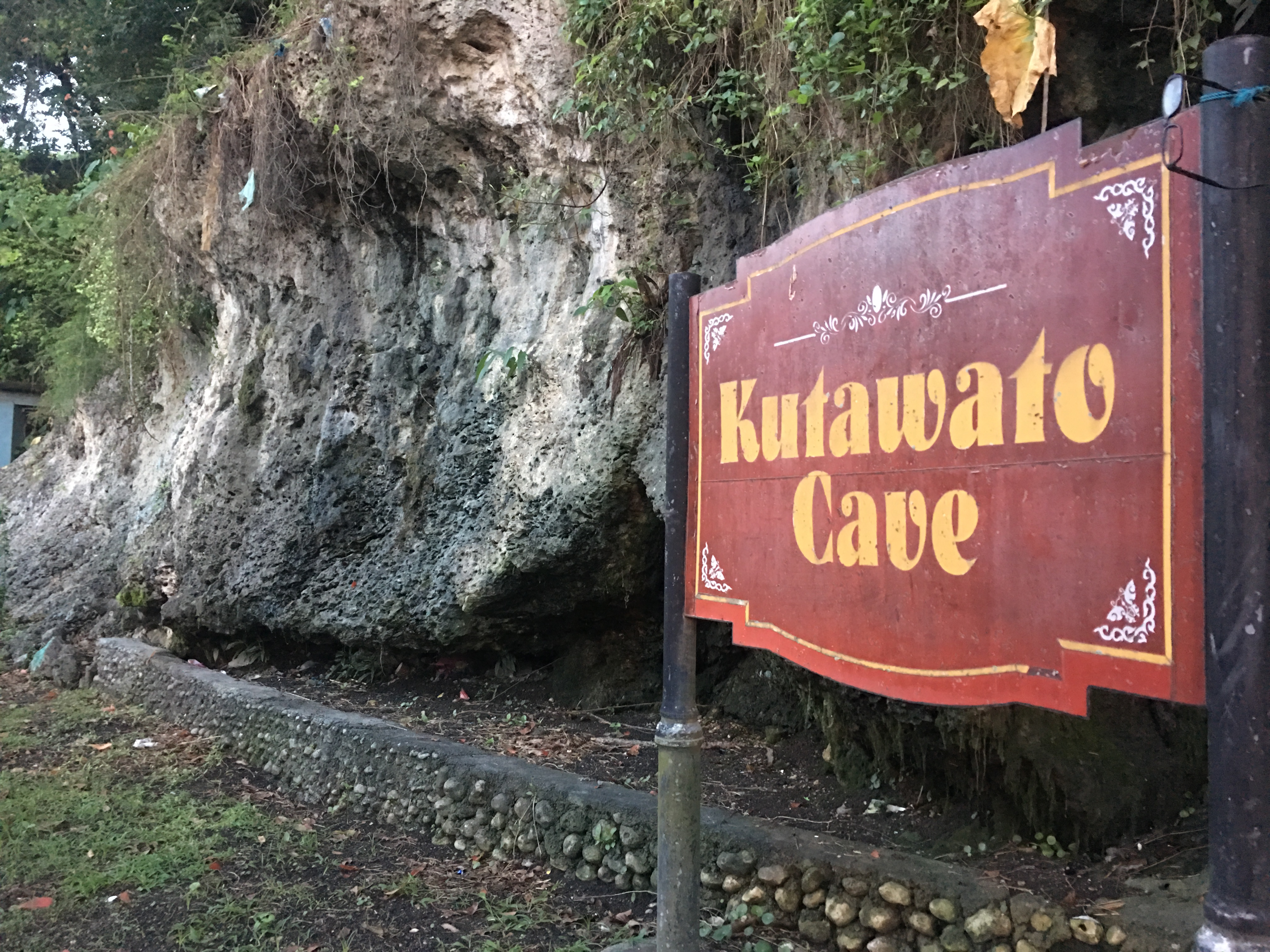
Signage of Main entrance of Kutawato Cave in Bagua

Kutawato Caves or Kutang Bato Cave is a cave in Cotabato City, Philippines and is the only cave system in the country. Situated within the city proper, the Kutawato Caves is located at the foot of Pedro Colina Hill. It has numerous hidden underground passageways, one of these is the tunnel connecting to Tamontaka Church, the oldest church in Cotabato City.

This cave is also the source of the city's present name, wherein kuta means fort and wato means stone, forming the phrase 'fort of stone', which later on became Cotabato. The cave has given sanctuary to the natives when the Spaniards tried to convert them into the Castilian faith and has served the purpose when Filipino guerillas fought the invading force of Japanese Imperial army during the World War II. When the Japanese firepower proved superior to that of the natives, the cave was then used as an armory and even a garrison. There are four entrances, namely : the provincial Capitol Cave, Bagua Cave, Caverna Espanol and the Kuweba ni Satur.
