= Cotabato City =

Independent component city in BARMM, Philippines

Cotabato City Kutawatu
- Independent component city
- City of Cotabato

Other transcription(s)
  - Jawi: كوتوات
  - Hokkien: 古島
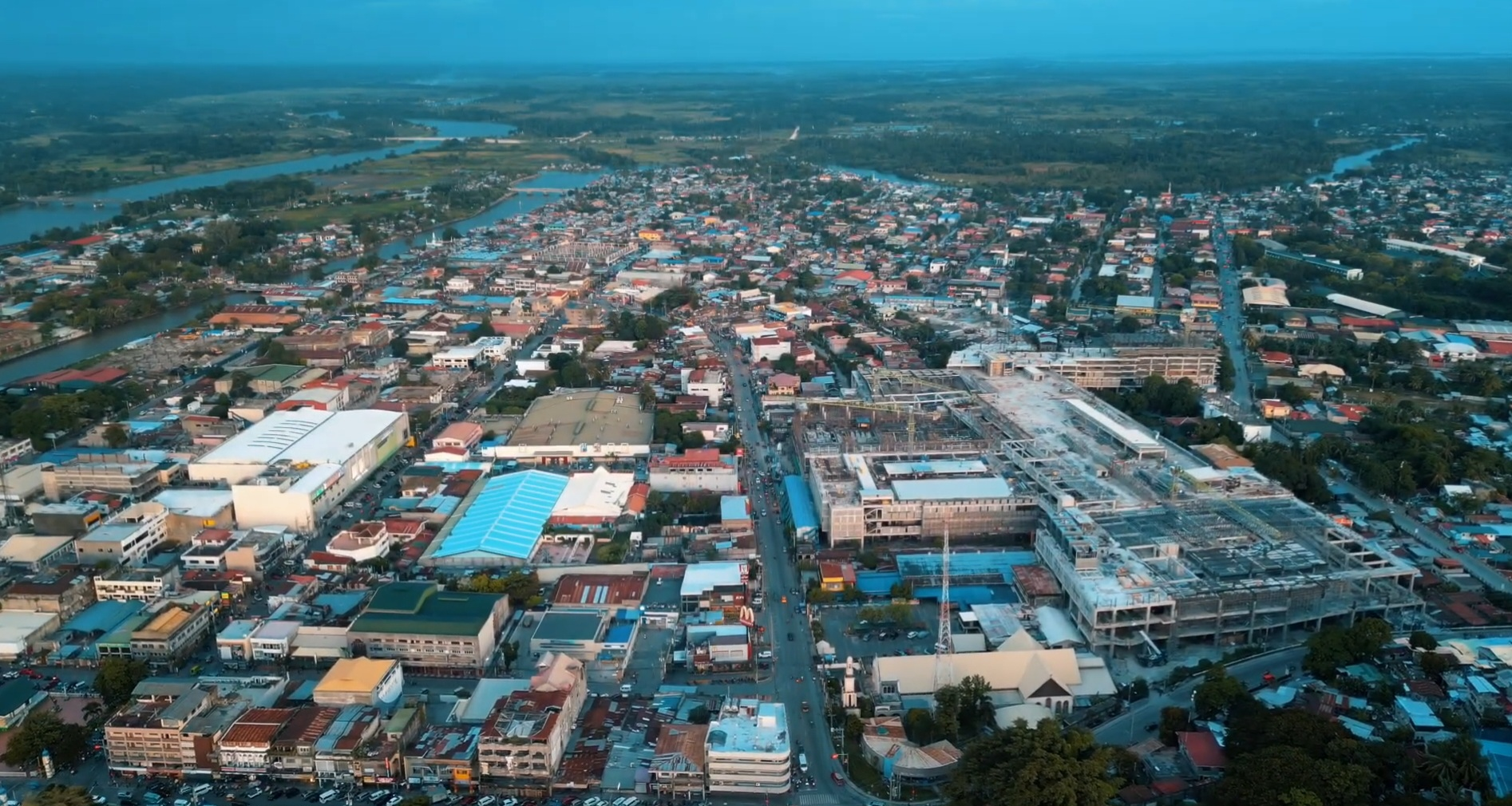
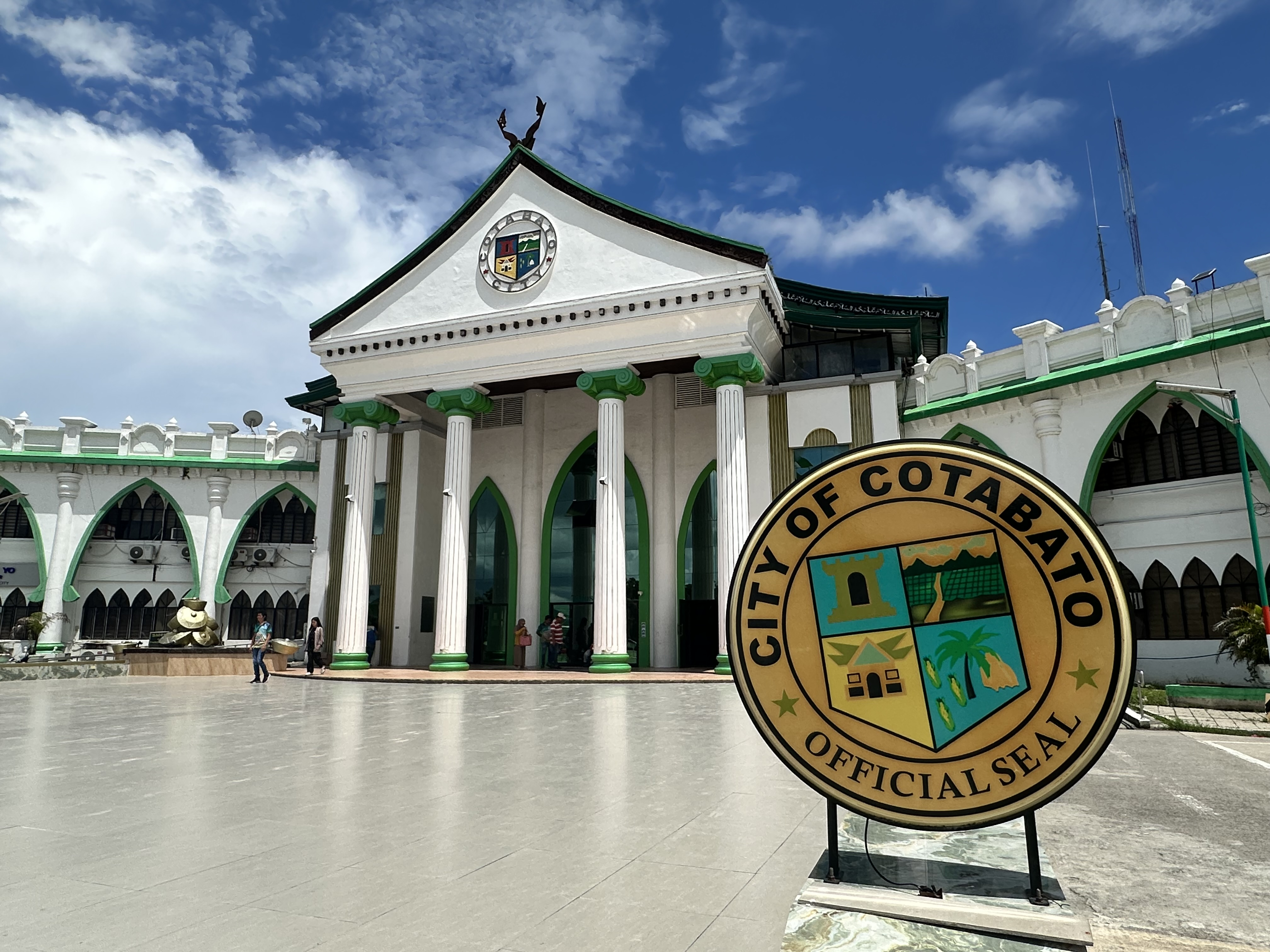
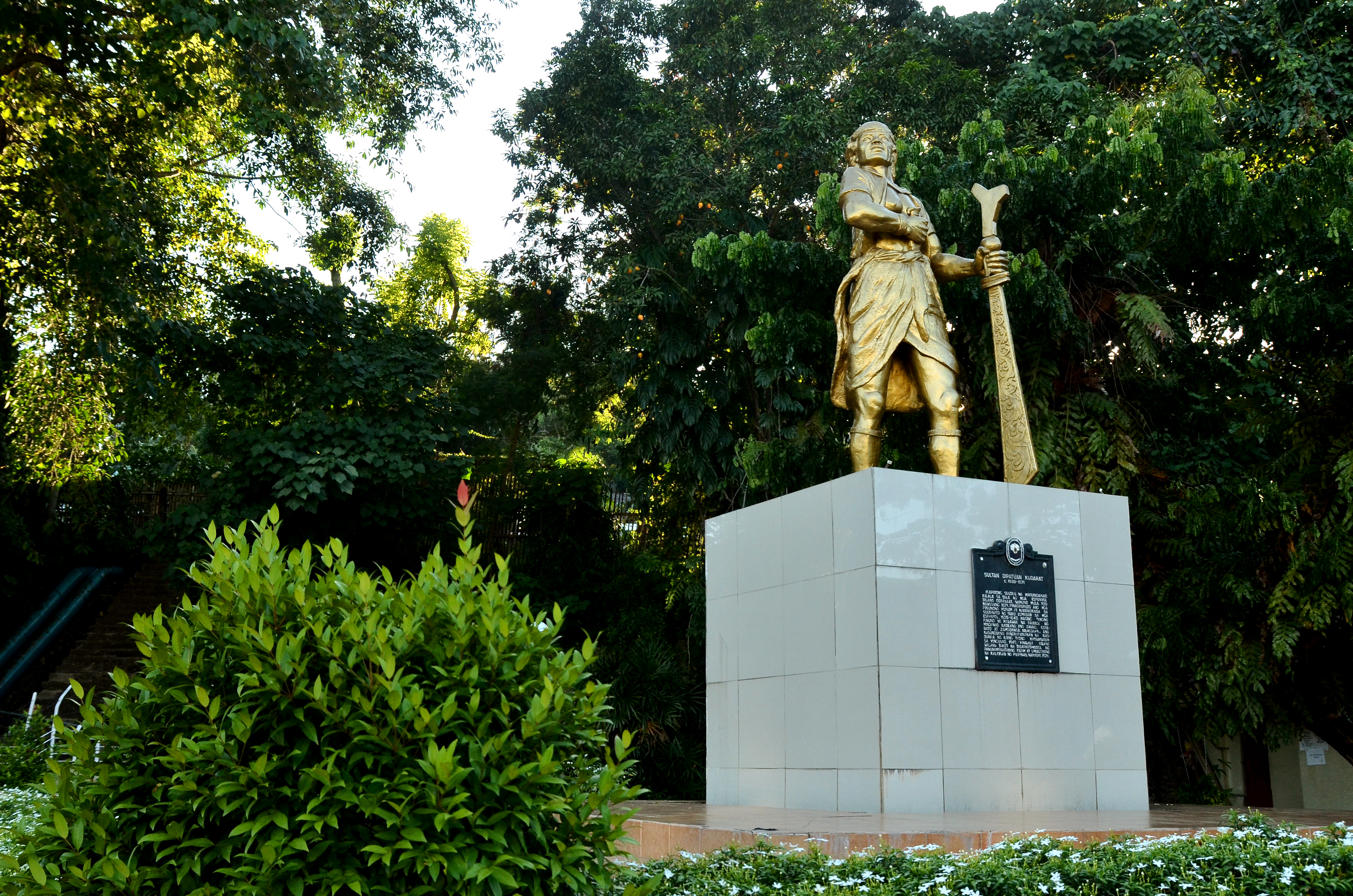
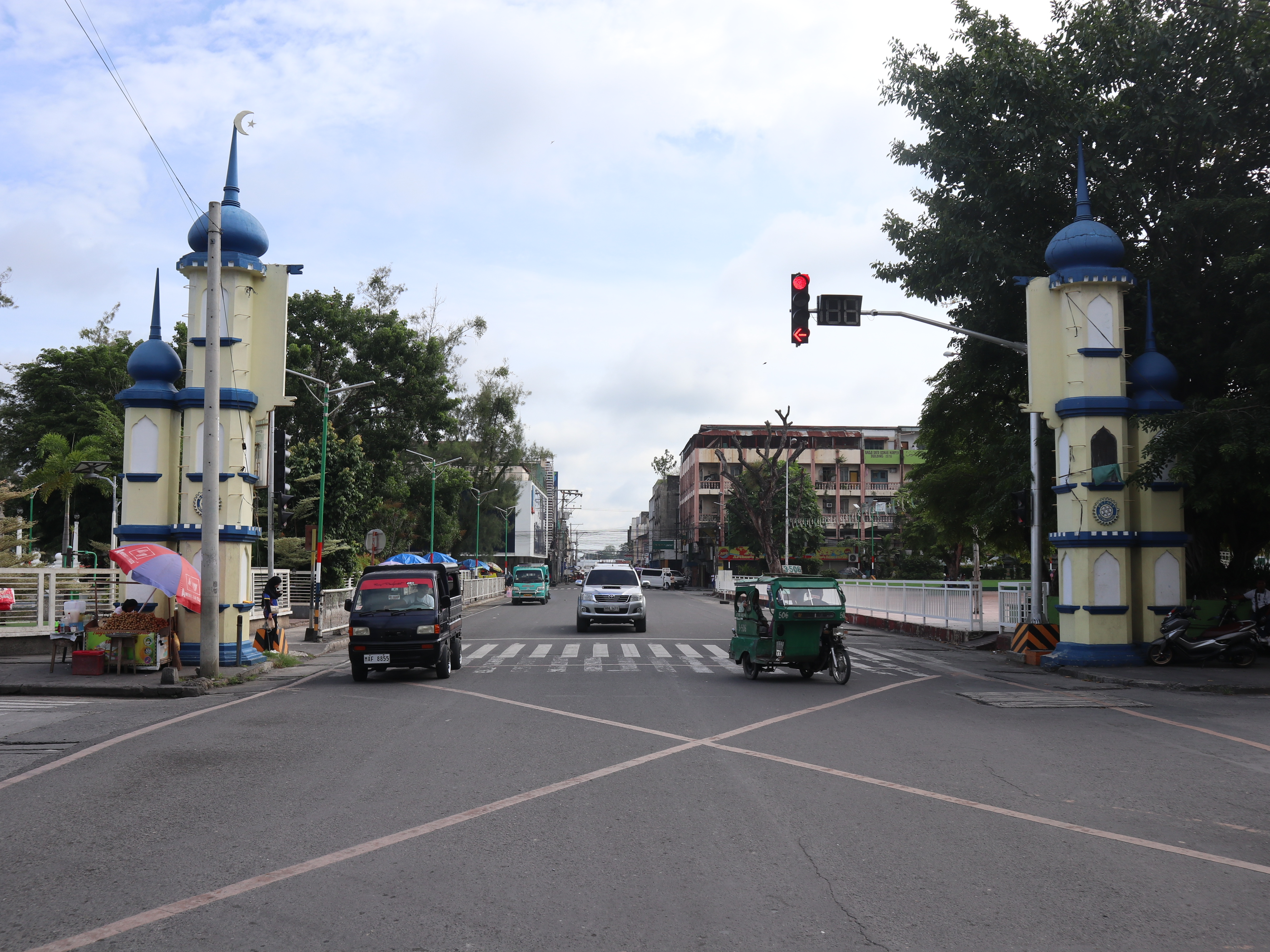
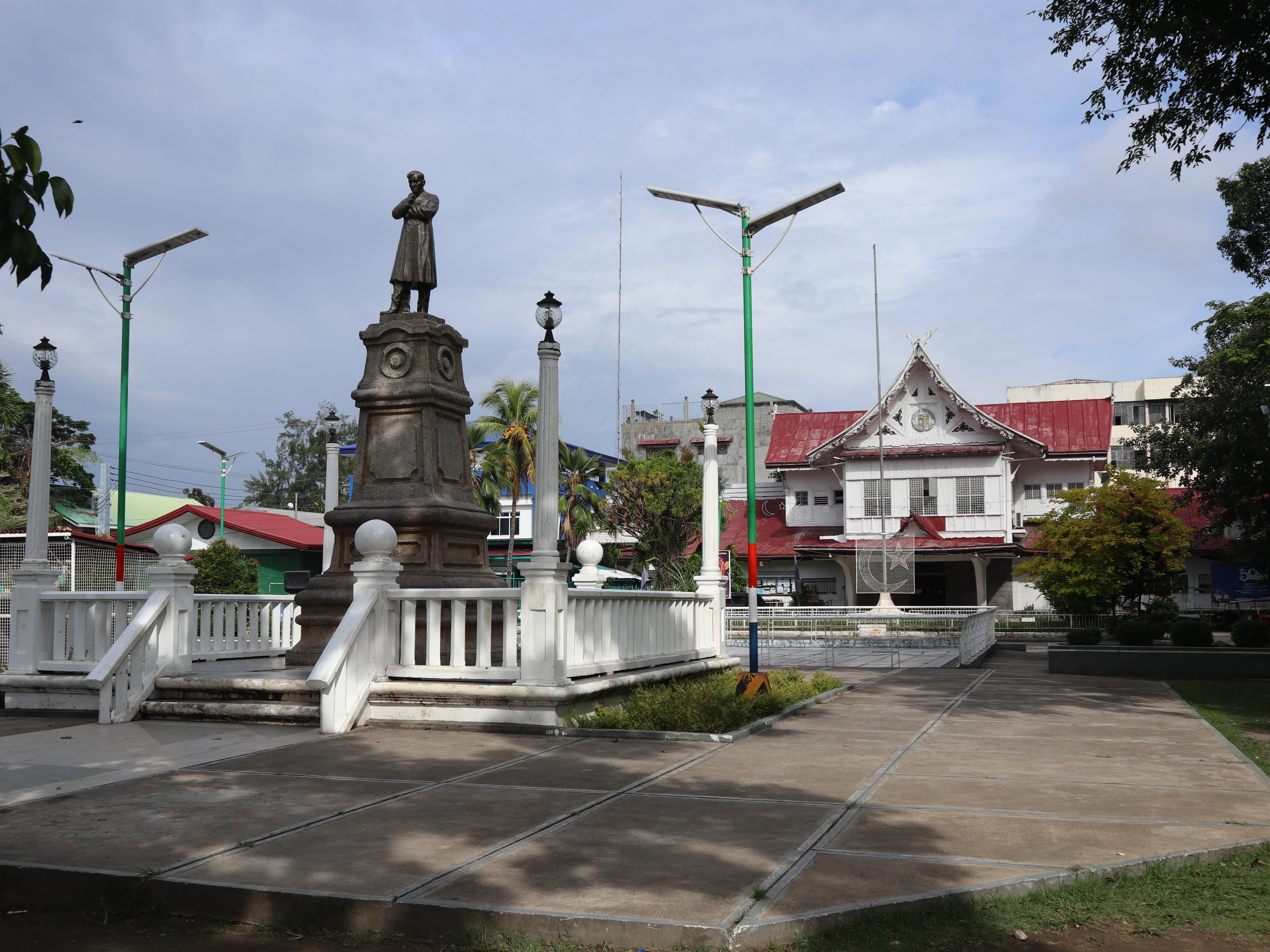
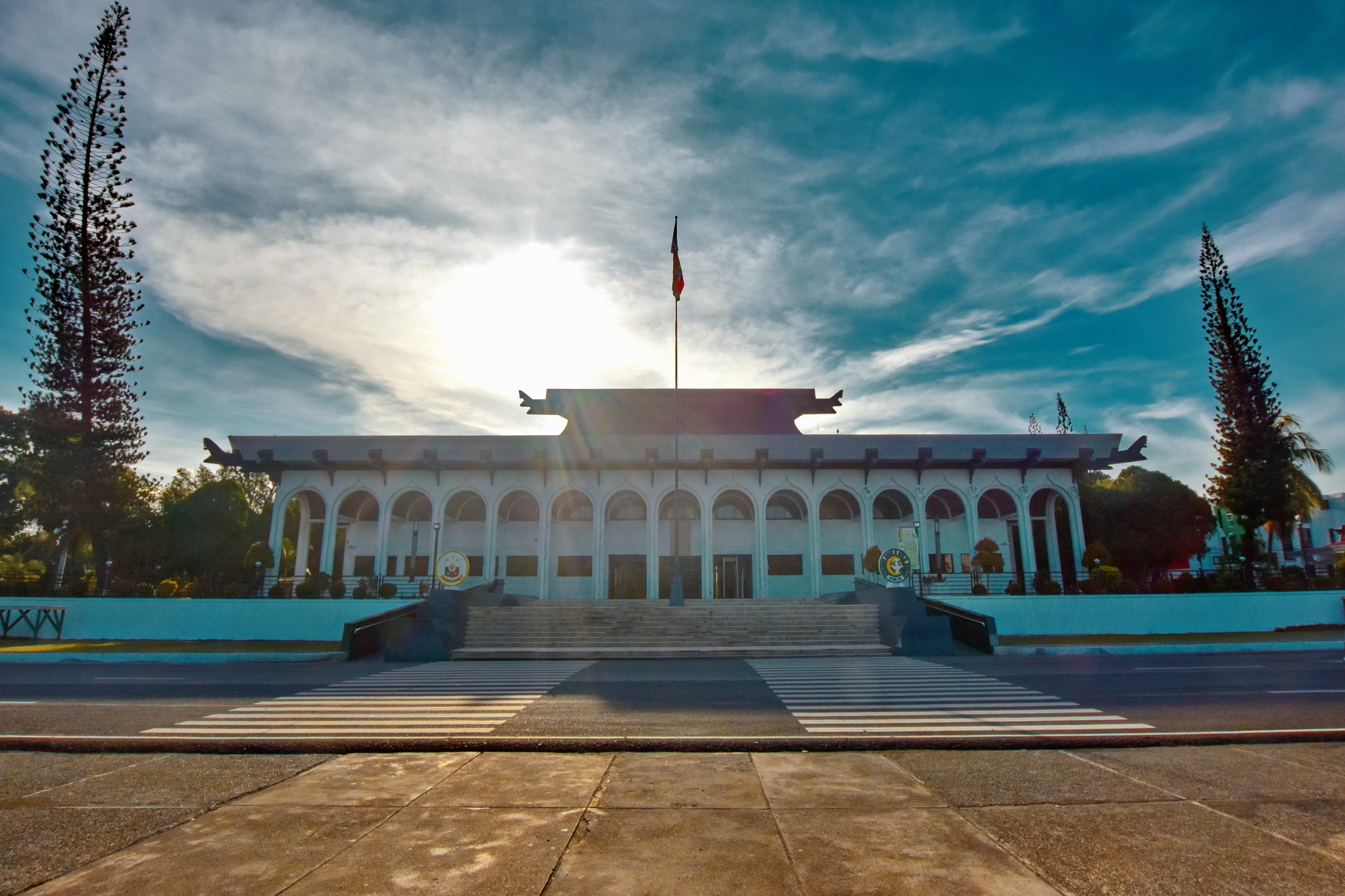
- From top, left and right: Bird's-eye view of Cotabato City; Cotabato City Hall; Sultan Kudarat Monument; Sinsuat Avenue; Old Cotabato City Hall; Bangsamoro Government Center

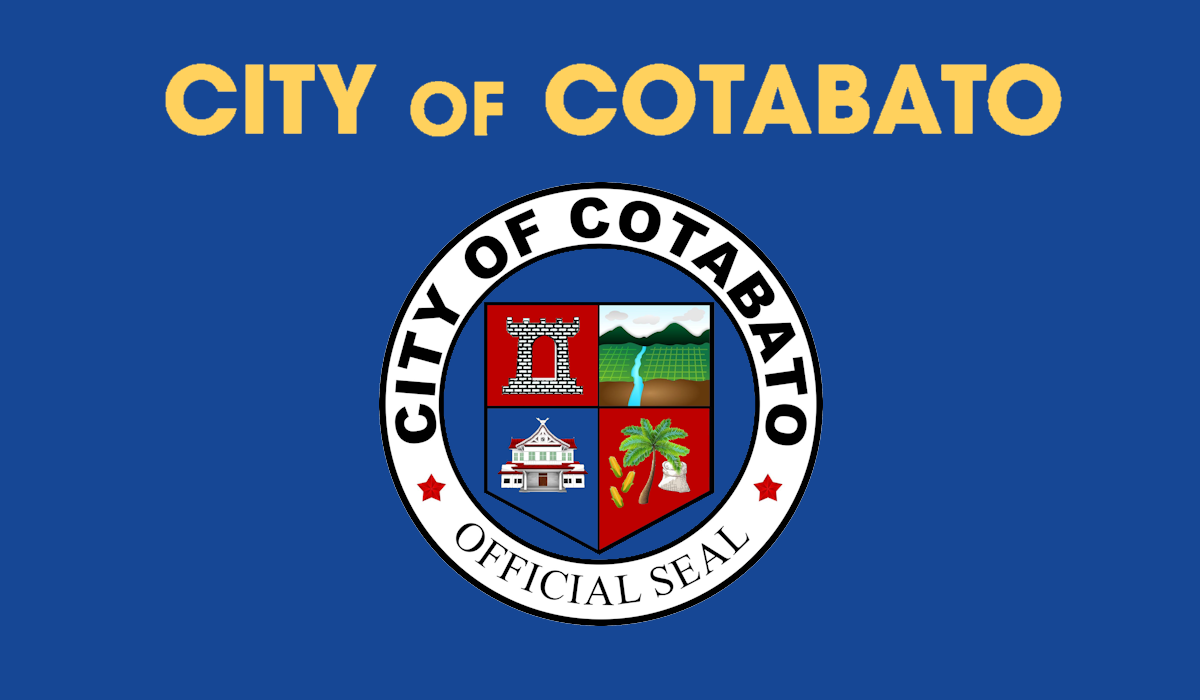
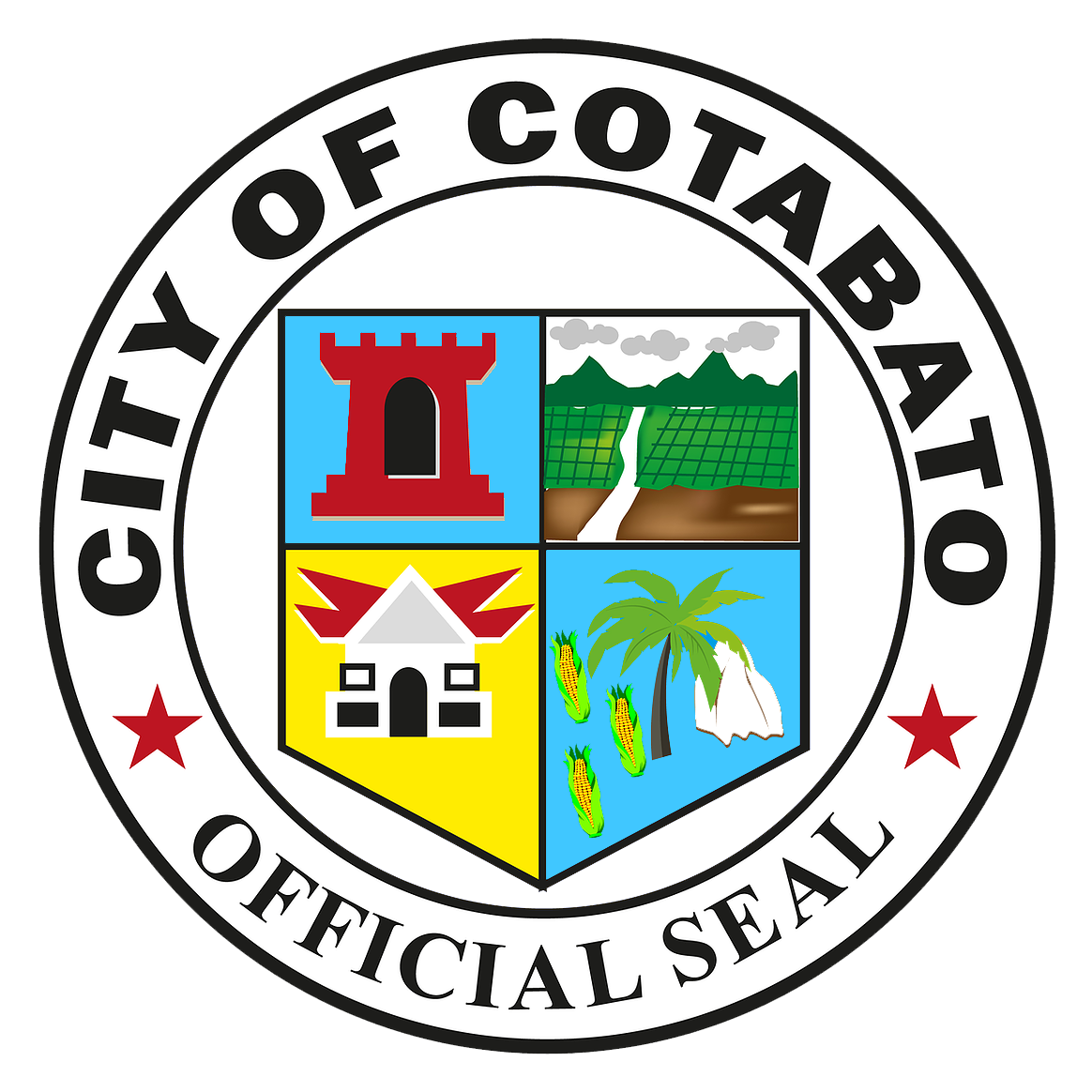
- Flag Seal
- Nicknames: City of Rivers and Creeks
- Motto: Sigay ka Cotabato! (Shine Cotabato!)
- Anthem: Awit ng Cotabato (Cotabato Hymn)
- Map of Maguindanao del Norte with Cotabato City highlighted
- Interactive map of Cotabato City
- Location within the Philippines
- Coordinates: 7°13′N 124°15′E
- Country: Philippines
- Region: Bangsamoro Autonomous Region in Muslim Mindanao
- Province: Maguindanao del Norte (geographically only)
- House district: Lone district of Maguindanao del Norte (shared with Cotabato City)
- Parliamentary district: 1st, 2nd, 3rd and MDN 3rd district
- Founded as capital of Maguindanao Sultanate: 1520
- Reinstituted under Spanish rule: April 30, 1861
- Established (municipality): October 29, 1903
- Cityhood: June 20, 1959
- Founder: Apo Mamalu and Apo Tabunaway
- Barangays: 37 (see Barangays)

Government
  - Type: Sangguniang Panlungsod
  - Mayor: Mohammad Ali Dela Cruz Matabalao (UBJP)
  - Vice Mayor: Johair S. Madag (UBJP)
  - House Representative: Sittie Shahara "Dimple" I. Mastura (Lakas)
  - City Council: Members: Florante "Popoy" L. Formento; Jonas Mohammad; Datu Raiz Sema; Michael Datumanong; Anwar Malang; Faidz Edzla; Guiadzuri Midtimbang II; Mohamad Ali Mangelen; Joven Pangilan; Shalimar Candao
  - Electorate: 131,128 voters (2026)

Area
  - Total: 176.00 km^{2} (67.95 sq mi)
- Elevation: 102 m (335 ft)
- Highest elevation: 784 m (2,572 ft)
- Lowest elevation: 0 m (0 ft)

Population (2024 census)
  - Total: 383,383
  - Density: 2,178.3/km^{2} (5,641.8/sq mi)
  - Households: 63,452
- Demonym(s): Cotabateño (masculine); Cotabateña (feminine)

Economy
  - Income class: 1st city income class
  - Poverty incidence: 44.8% (2023)
  - Revenue: ₱ 1,589 million (2024)
  - Assets: ₱ 515.8 million (2024)
  - Expenditure: ₱ 147.6 million (2024)
  - Liabilities: ₱ 2,014 million (2024)
  - NTA share: ₱3.438 billion (2026)

Service provider
  - Electricity: Cotabato Light and Power Company (CLPC)
  - Water: Metro Cotabato Water District (MCWD)
  - Telecommunications: SMART Telecom, Globe, PLDT and DITO Telecom
  - Cable TV: Cotabato Cable TV Network and SkyCable - Maguindanao
- Time zone: UTC+8 (PST)
- ZIP code: 9600
- PSGC: 129804000
- IDD : area code: +63 (0)64
- Languages: Maguindanaon; Cebuano; Tagalog
- Website: ecotabatocity.ph

Cotabato City, officially the City of Cotabato, (Note: Maguindanaon: Kuta nu Kutawato, Jawi: كوت نو كوتوات; Filipino: Lungsod ng Cotabato; Cebuano: Dakbayan sa Cotabato; Hiligaynon: Dakbanwa sang Cotabato; Maranao: Bandar a Cotabato; Kapampangan: Ciudad/Lakanbalen ning Cotabato; Ilocano: Siudad ti Cotabato; Central Bikol: Siyudad kan Cotabato; Waray: Syudad han Cotabato) is an independent component city in the Bangsamoro Autonomous Region in Muslim Mindanao, Philippines. According to the 2024 census, it has a population of 383,383 people, making it the most populated city under the independent component city status.

Cotabato City was formerly a part and the regional center of Region XII, but due to the ratification of the Bangsamoro Organic Law, it is now part of Bangsamoro and serves as the regional center. Being an independent component city, it is not subject to regulation from the Provincial Government of Maguindanao del Norte where it is geographically located. The Philippine Statistics Authority also lists Cotabato City as statistically independent. It was the capital of the Sultanate of Maguindanao.

== History ==
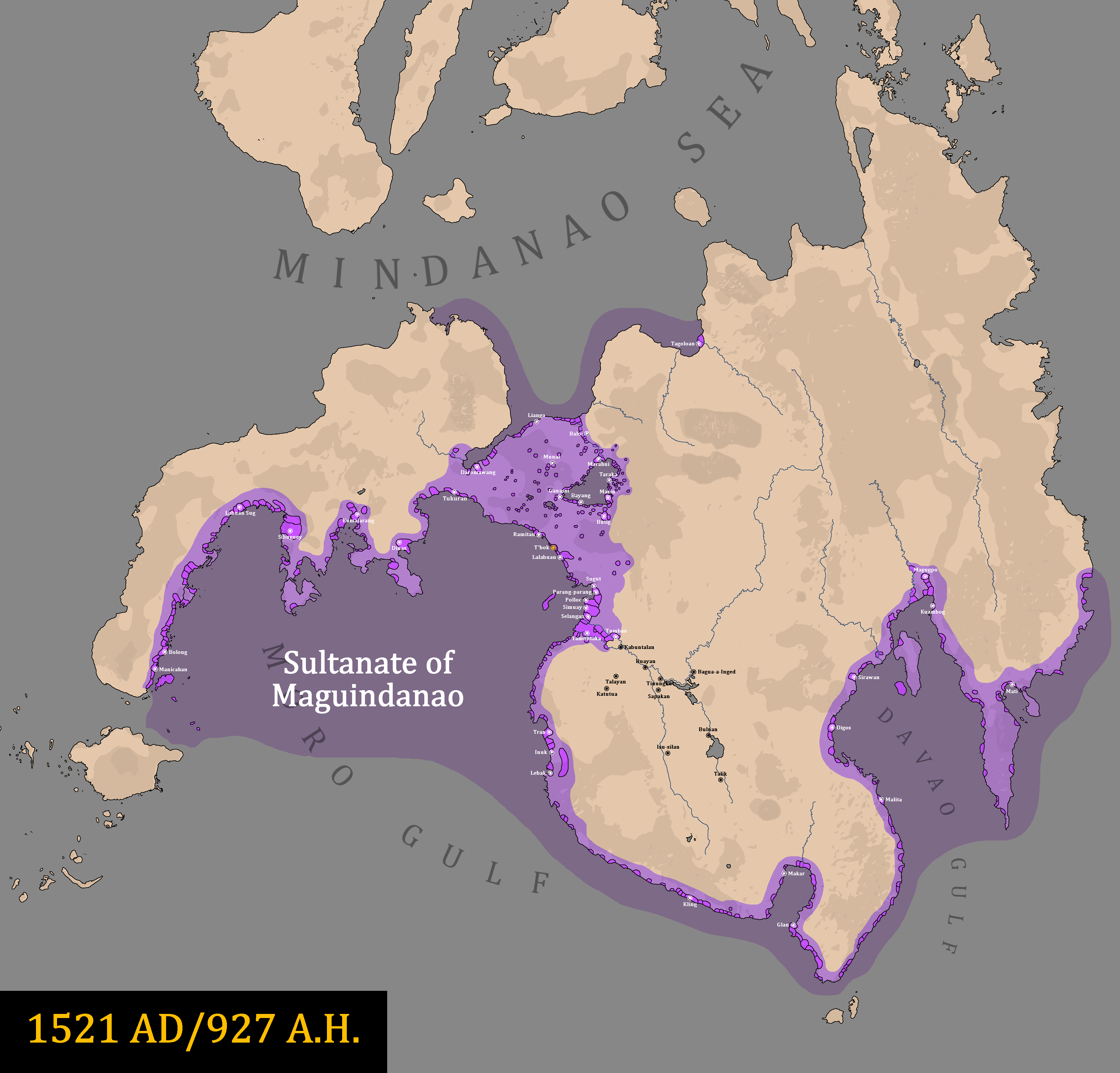
Territory of the Sultanate of Maguindanao in 1521 and Cotabato City serving as its capital.

Prior to the arrival of Hindus and Muslims, the city was a vast swamp and rainforest landscape where numerous ethno-linguistic groups lived. Maguindanao vernacular architecture developed during this era, which included the architectural techniques of at least 10 ethno-linguistic groups. Later on, Hindu traders arrived and the people of the area embraced the practice of Hinduism. The set of moral standards and culture of present-day people of Maguindanao are seen due to this Hindu influence.

=== Sultanate of Maguindanao ===
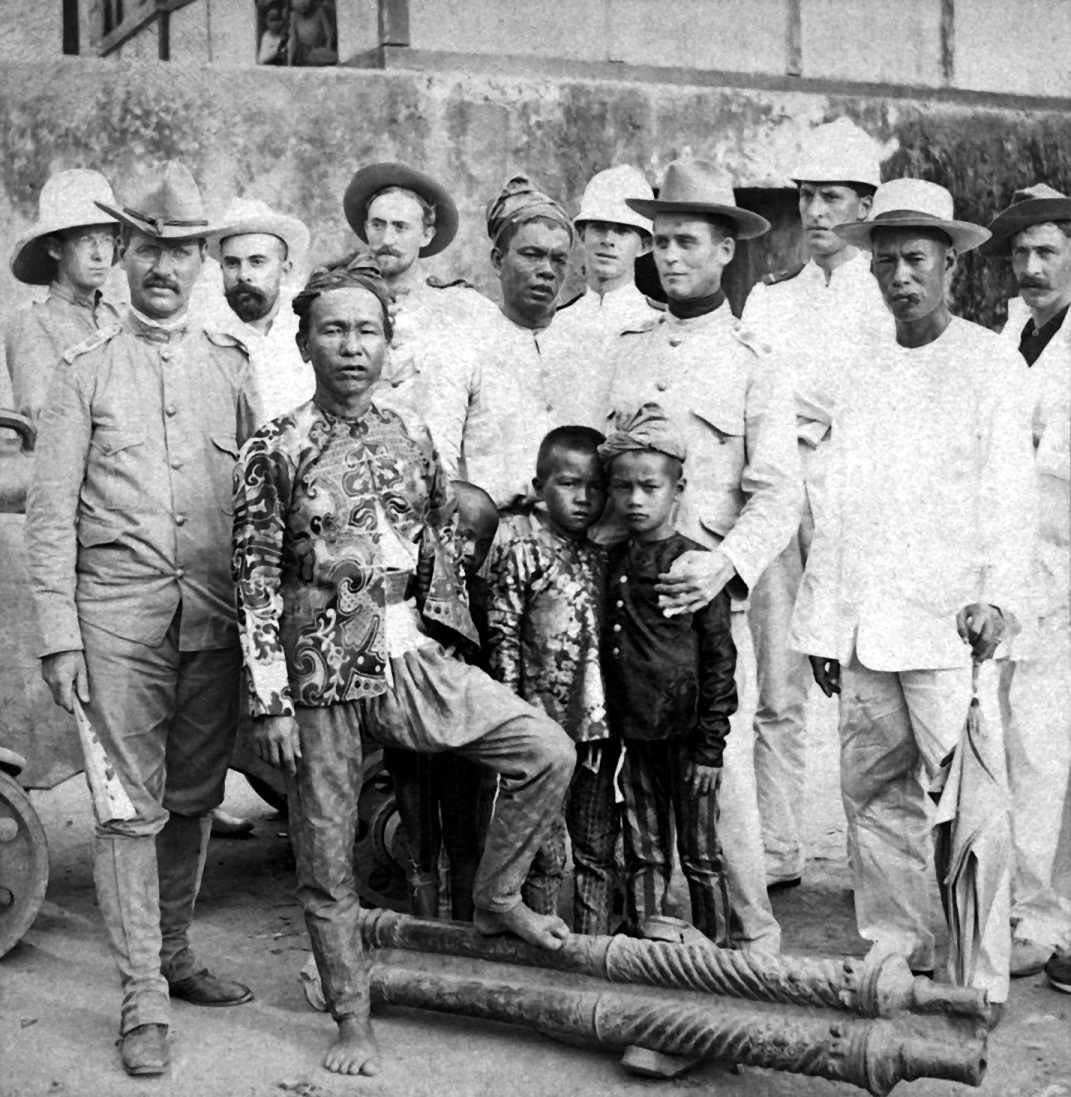
Datu Piang (4th from left) with American officers circa 1899. He was the first governor of the Empire Province of Cotabato; Cotabato City was once the capital of the province from 1920 to 1967.

By 1515, after a successful Muslim establishment in Sulu, Muslim merchants went to Maguindanao and converted many Maguindanaoans to Islam. Those that did not accept the arrival of the Muslims went into higher ground or the interior of the island and became the Teduray, as well as other lumad groups. During the same year, the Sultanate of Maguindanao was formally established, with Tubok as its initial capital. However, the sultan's seat would eventually be transferred in 1711 at around Tamontaka, a barangay within modern-day Cotabato. In 1861, Spain would eventually establish a garrison in Maguindanao and establish Kuta Watu, which was eventually renamed as Cotabato, as its new capital.

=== Spanish and American occupation ===
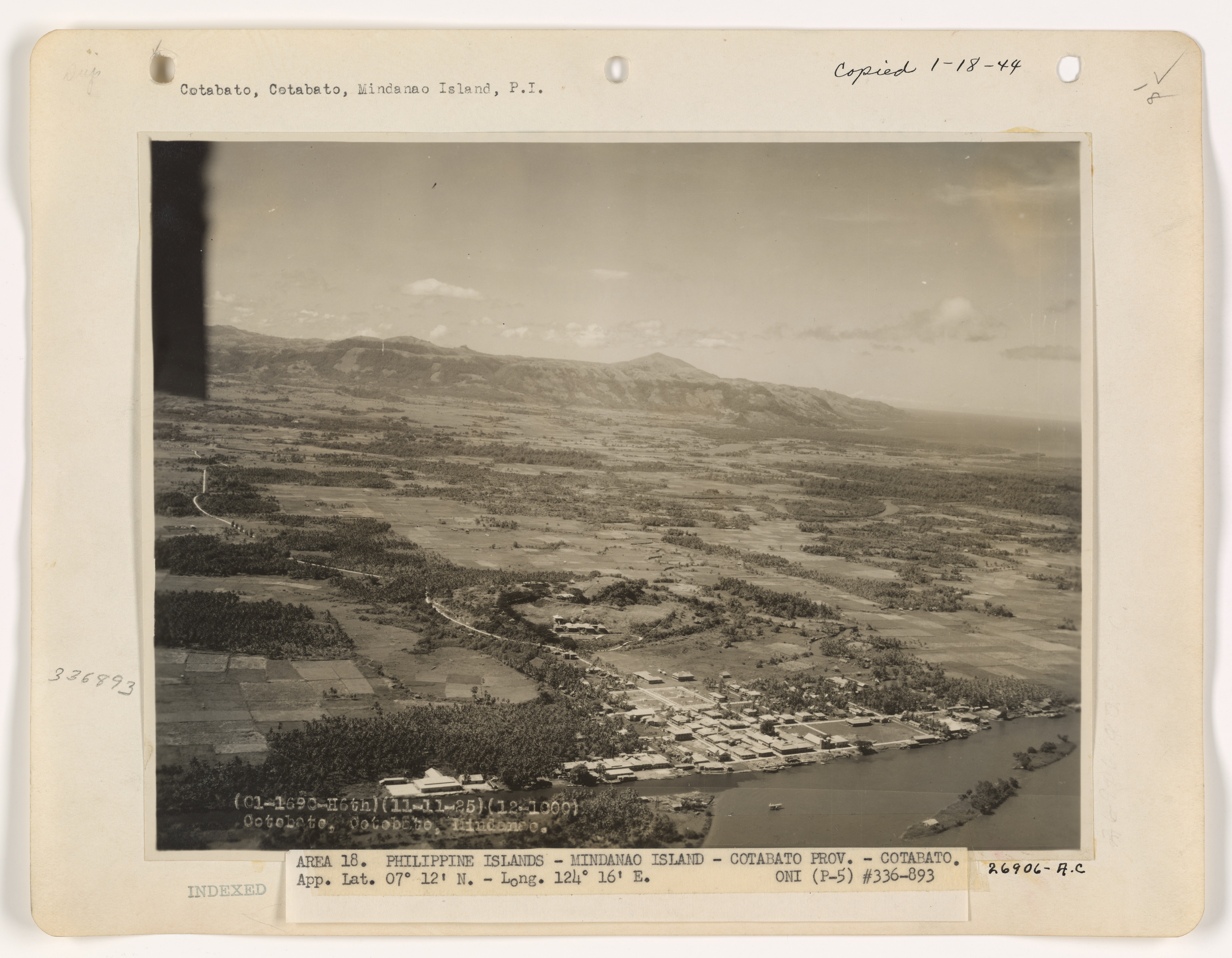
Aerial view of Cotabato, circa pre-1944

The Spanish Empire had defeated the Sulu Sultanate in war and forced it to sign an unfavorable peace treaty in 1851. With the Moro Gulf and Illana Bay now open to Spanish traffic as a result of their victory over the Sulu Moros, this paved the way for the first steps for the conquest of the Maguindanao Sultanate several years later. To that end, Spanish Jesuit missionaries have already made their way as early as 1859 at Polloc where they earned several hundred converts, but the place was deemed unsuitable on account of its less than optimal ecology. And so the Spanish district governor of Mindanao based in Zamboanga requested Datu Amirul, the father of present Sultan of Maguindanao Muhammad Makakua, for them to establish a military base at the stone fortress at Kota Wato in what is now Barangay Tamontaka, and Datu Amirul gave the consent. The Spanish then established themselves at the said fort, raising the Spanish flag there and renamed it Cotabato, the Hispanized form of its name, on April 30, 1861. The Spanish and the Moro chiefs and locals then had a conference later the same day which stipulated the Maguindanaoan locals of Cotabato are now subjects of the Spanish Crown but their Islamic beliefs would be respected. Thus, on April 30, 1861, in the flood plains of Tamontaka, the town of Cotabato was officially born.

Under the reign of Sultan Muhammad Makakua, who while being the nominal sultan of Maguindanao was at this point under complete Spanish vassalage, roads and wharves were built in Cotabato, specifically where the Tamontaka River was situated. Forests were felled and cleared by the new Catholic Tiruray converts of Tamontaka to make way for the expansion of the newly established town. In 1871, the capital of the Spanish military district of Mindanao was moved from Zamboanga to Cotabato, only to be moved back previously the next year when a destructive earthquake ravaged the town.

Following the Spanish evacuation in Jan. 1899, Datu Piang led the Moro's in a massacre of the remaining Christian community, enslaving those they did not kill. Americans arrived in Mindanao in 1900 after the Spanish–American War ended in 1898. Cotabato town was part of Moro Province and of Department of Mindanao and Sulu from 1903 to 1920, when the Empire Province of Cotabato, referred to as "Moroland" by the Americans, was founded with the town as the capital, with Datu Piang as its first governor.

=== Cotabato ===
Several towns were carved off from Cotabato town since the year 1913, with Pikit being the first one founded by Cebuano Christian colonists. Dulawan (now Datu Piang, Maguindanao del Sur) and Midsayap were incorporated as regular municipalities in 1936. In 1942, at the beginning of the Pacific Front of World War II, the Japanese Imperial forces entered what is now the Maguindanao del Norte and Maguindanao del Sur provinces. In 1945, Maguindanao was liberated by allied Philippine Commonwealth troops and Muslim Maguindanaoan guerrilla units after defeating the Japanese Imperial forces in the Battle of Maguindanao during the Second World War. On August 18, 1947, just two years after the Second World War and a year after the official inauguration of Philippine independence, the number of towns in the gigantic Cotabato province were multiplied by Executive Order No. 82 signed by President Manuel Roxas, namely: Kidapawan, Pagalungan, Buayan, Marbel, Parang, Nuling, Dinaig, Salaman, Buluan, Kiamba, and Cabacan, a total of eleven (11) towns added to the previous four towns; the newly founded towns of Kabuntalan, Pikit (conversion as regular municipality), and Glan added up on September 30, 1949. More and more newly created towns added up in the province's number of towns as the province entered the second half of the 20th century.

=== Cityhood ===
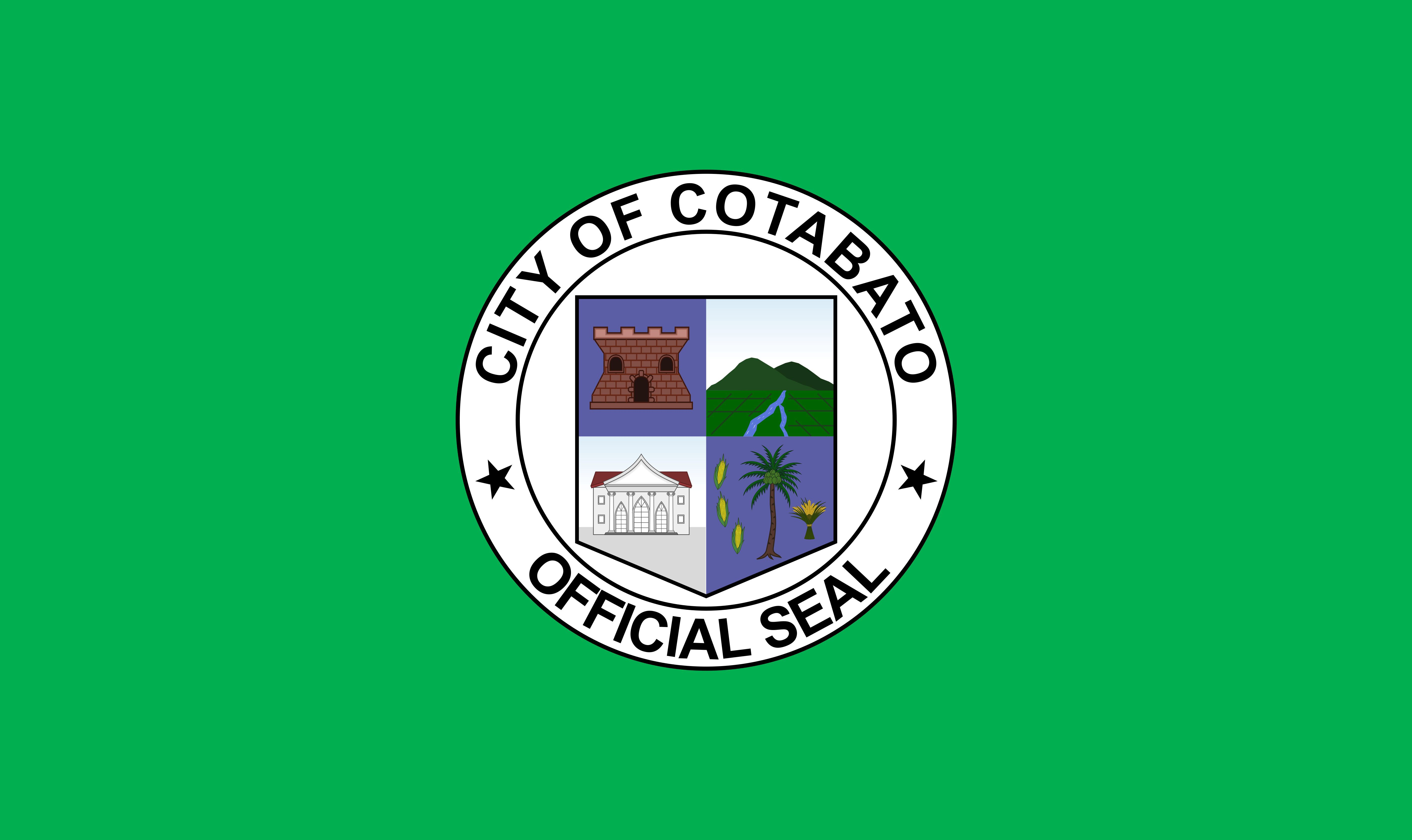
Former flag of Cotabato City

The city was chartered when President Carlos P. Garcia signed into law the Republic Act No. 2364 on June 20, 1959. Authored then by Senator Salipada K. Pendatun. Under the said charter, the city was politically sibdivided into five (5) Barangays namely Poblacion, Rosary Heights, Bagua, Kalanganan, and Tamontaka. In 1989, the existing Barangays were split up which resulted into 32 more Barangays, presently the City has 37 Barangays.

The city used to be part of the original Province of Cotabato and was its capital from 1920 until 1967, a year after the separation of South Cotabato; since then the city was the administrative center of the ARMM when Maguindanao was carved out in 1973.

However, the city broke off administratively from Maguindanao as it rejoined Soccsksargen in the 1990s. Now many sources consider the city as part of the present Cotabato province, although geographically it is still considered part of Maguindanao del Norte.

On November 4, 2026, under Proclamation no. 1498 by President Bongbong Marcos, the city will soon to be converted into a highly-urbanized city pending plebiscite approval.

=== Inclusion in the Bangsamoro region ===
The city has traditionally resisted efforts for its inclusion to the Autonomous Region in Muslim Mindanao despite serving as the government center of the region. Despite this, the city's residents voted for their locality's inclusion in the new Bangsamoro Autonomous Region by voting to ratify the Bangsamoro Organic Law in the January 21, 2019 plebiscite. The city became de jure part of Bangsamoro following the plebiscite, as well as the government center of the new region. It became official part of the region after its formal turnover to the Bangsamoro regional government on December 15, 2020.

== Geography ==
Cotabato is approximately 698.9 nautical miles (1,294.4 kilometres) from Manila, the country's capital, and is bounded by the municipalities of Sultan Kudarat to the north—with Rio Grande de Mindanao/Pulangi River separating the two—Kabuntalan to the east, and Datu Odin Sinsuat to the south. The city faces Illana Bay, part of the Moro Gulf, to the west.

Cotabato City has a total land area of 176.0 square kilometres (68.0 sq mi), located at the mouth of the Rio Grande de Mindanao and Pulangi River.

=== Urban Areas ===
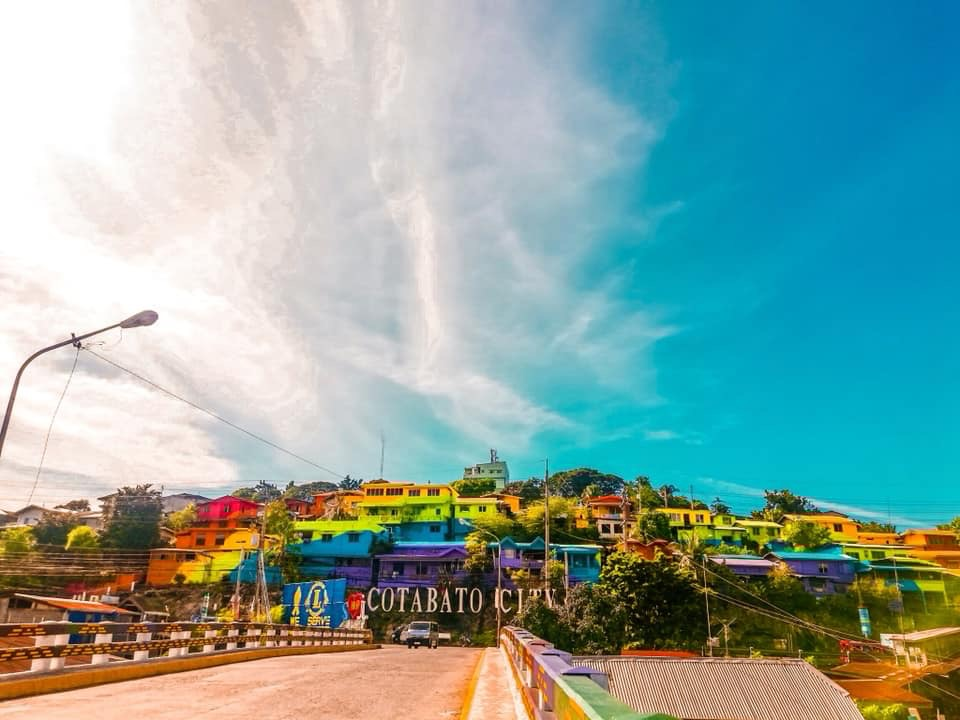
Pedro Colina Hill

Cotabato City has 27 urban barangays that are grouped into two major urban areas, the Down Town Area and the Upper Town Area.

Down Town Area The Downtown Area encompasses the barangays of Poblacion and Bagua, with a population exceeding 150,000. Situated below sea level, it faces constant flooding risks. Serving as Cotabato City's central hub for banking, trading, and commerce, it hosts over 20 banks and major wet markets like Mega Market and City Arcade. Additionally, prominent malls and supermarkets such as South Seas Mall, Puregold Main Branch, Sugni Super Store, and Superama (with 3 branches) are situated here, along with KCC Mall of Cotabato. Notable educational institutions include Notre Dame University, Cotabato City Central Pilot School (the largest elementary school), STI Cotabato, and Notre Dame of Cotabato.

Upper Town Area The Upper Town Area, situated in the elevated regions of Cotabato City, encompasses all barangays of Rosary Heights and is home to the Peoples Palace (City Hall). Serving as the service center of Cotabato City, it houses Regional Government Agencies from both the Bangsamoro Region and Region 12. Additionally, it is home to Cotabato Regional and Medical Center, along with other medical facilities. Educational institutions in this area include Cotabato State University, Notre Dame-RVM, and AMA Computer College, as well as the now-closed University of Mindanao. Major shopping destinations include CityMall, Mall of Alnor, and Fiesta Mall.

Two other emerging areas include Barangays of Kalanganan, where the Seaport and Grand Mosque are situated. The primary industry here revolves around aquaculture, with proposed developments for a Public Market and Public Terminal. Additionally, construction of a coastal road is underway in this area. Another burgeoning area is the Barangays of Tamontaka, slated for the establishment of an International Airport. Tamontaka also serves as the eastern diversion road of Cotabato City.

=== Topography ===
The city is situated in the lowest portion of Maguindanao del Norte. The City of Cotabato with its 37 barangays spans an area with marked landscapes of flat, level to nearly level, very gently sloping to gently undulations to moderately sloping or rolling. It is basically a delta formed by two big rivers, the Tamontaka River and the Rio Grande de Mindanao. Basically 70% of its total land area is below sea level. There are only 2 existing elevated areas in the city, the PC Hill and the Timako Hill with an altitude of 90 and 150 feet, respectively. At the foot of PC Hill is Tantawan Park and also hosts the Kutang Bato Caves.

Concentration of settlements and other urban uses are in the central portion while the southwestern and southeastern portion have mixed uses of agricultural land settlements. The city is criss-crossed by meandering and braided creeks and rivers like the Matampay, Parang, Timako, Esteros and Miwaruy.

These water bodies serve as sources of both agricultural, industrial and domestic water requirements of some rural barangays. These rivers also serve as the natural drainage flow of the city's wastes.

=== Barangays ===
Cotabato City is politically subdivided into 37 barangays. Each barangay consists of puroks while some have sitios.

Currently, there are 27 urban barangays as classified by Philippine Statistics Authority (highlighted in bold).

- **Bagua Mother**
- **Bagua I**
- **Bagua II**
- **Bagua III**
- **Kalanganan Mother**
- **Kalanganan I**
- **Kalanganan II**
- **Poblacion Mother**
- Poblacion I
- **Poblacion II**
- Poblacion III
- **Poblacion IV**
- **Poblacion V**
- **Poblacion VI**
- **Poblacion VII**
- **Poblacion VIII**
- **Poblacion IX**
- **Rosary Heights Mother**
- Rosary Heights I
- **Rosary Heights II**
- **Rosary Heights III**
- Rosary Heights IV
- **Rosary Heights V**
- **Rosary Heights VI**
- **Rosary Heights VII**
- **Rosary Heights VIII**
- **Rosary Heights IX**
- **Rosary Heights X**
- **Rosary Heights XI**
- Rosary Heights XII
- **Rosary Heights XIII**
- **Tamontaka Mother**
- Tamontaka I
- Tamontaka II
- Tamontaka III
- Tamontaka IV
- Tamontaka V

=== Climate ===
Under the Köppen climate classification system, Cotabato City features a tropical rainforest climate (Af) with consistently hot, humid and wet weather year-round. There is a drier season from January to February, but unlike western Luzon rainfall is still over 80 millimetres or 3 inches in every month.

Climate data for Cotabato City (1991-2020, extremes 1986-2023)
Month	Jan	Feb	Mar	Apr	May	Jun	Jul	Aug	Sep	Oct	Nov	Dec	Year
Record high °C (°F)	36.8 (98.2)	37.3 (99.1)	37.9 (100.2)	38.6 (101.5)	38.6 (101.5)	36.7 (98.1)	36.8 (98.2)	36.5 (97.7)	36.3 (97.3)	36.4 (97.5)	36.6 (97.9)	36.2 (97.2)	38.6 (101.5)
Mean daily maximum °C (°F)	32.6 (90.7)	33.1 (91.6)	33.6 (92.5)	34.0 (93.2)	33.4 (92.1)	32.5 (90.5)	32.2 (90.0)	32.3 (90.1)	32.4 (90.3)	32.4 (90.3)	32.9 (91.2)	32.8 (91.0)	32.9 (91.2)
Daily mean °C (°F)	27.7 (81.9)	28.0 (82.4)	28.4 (83.1)	28.8 (83.8)	28.3 (82.9)	27.7 (81.9)	27.4 (81.3)	27.6 (81.7)	27.6 (81.7)	27.7 (81.9)	27.9 (82.2)	27.9 (82.2)	27.9 (82.2)
Mean daily minimum °C (°F)	22.8 (73.0)	23.0 (73.4)	23.3 (73.9)	23.5 (74.3)	23.2 (73.8)	22.8 (73.0)	22.7 (72.9)	22.8 (73.0)	22.9 (73.2)	22.9 (73.2)	23.0 (73.4)	22.9 (73.2)	23.0 (73.4)
Record low °C (°F)	18.9 (66.0)	20.8 (69.4)	21.0 (69.8)	21.0 (69.8)	21.0 (69.8)	20.5 (68.9)	20.6 (69.1)	20.5 (68.9)	20.8 (69.4)	20.8 (69.4)	20.7 (69.3)	20.0 (68.0)	18.9 (66.0)
Average rainfall mm (inches)	88.5 (3.48)	94.8 (3.73)	117.4 (4.62)	140.6 (5.54)	252.9 (9.96)	312.9 (12.32)	314.9 (12.40)	239.1 (9.41)	251.9 (9.92)	278.9 (10.98)	189.9 (7.48)	132.5 (5.22)	2,414.3 (95.05)
Average rainy days (≥ 0.1 mm)	10	9	10	10	16	19	19	15	16	16	14	11	165
Average relative humidity (%)	76	75	74	74	75	77	77	77	77	77	76	76	76
Source: PAGASA

== Demographics ==
Population census of Cotabato City

Year	Pop.	±% p.a.
1903	1,103	—
1918	5,870	+11.79%
1939	10,166	+2.65%
1948	20,407	+8.05%
1960	37,499	+5.20%
1970	61,184	+5.01%
1975	67,097	+1.87%
1980	83,871	+4.56%

Year	Pop.	±% p.a.
1990	127,065	+4.24%
1995	146,779	+2.74%
2000	163,849	+2.39%
2007	259,153	+6.53%
2010	271,786	+1.75%
2015	299,438	+1.86%
2020	325,079	+1.74%
2024	383,383	+4.04%

Source: Philippine Statistics Authority

The majority of the inhabitants of Cotabato City are Maguindanaons, comprising about 50% of the city's population. There are sizable ethnic populations of Cebuanos (14%), Tagalogs (9.7%), Iranuns (7%), Hiligaynons (5.6%), Bisaya (2.7%) and Chinese (2%). The remainder of the population belongs to other ethnicities (e.g. Tausug, Teduray, Ilocano, Maranao and Indian).

=== Language ===
Maguindanaon is widely understood and spoken in Cotabato City, being the native language of the Maguindanaon and some other ethnicities in the city could also speak and understand it. The related Danao languages of Iranun and Maranao are spoken by residents of the corresponding ethnicities. Other Moro languages such as Tausug, Sama and Yakan are also spoken in the city.

The main lingua franca is Tagalog, making Cotabato City the "Tagalog-speaking city of Mindanao". It is the only place outside Luzon that is predominantly Tagalog-speaking. Soccsksargen Tagalog, a Mindanao-based Tagalog dialect, is also spoken in the city.

Chavacano, Ilonggo, Ilocano and Cebuano are spoken as well by the various Christian minorities of the city. Chavacano has its own dialect in the city called Cotabateño, but it was replaced by Tagalog as the lingua franca, which reduced the number of native Chavacano speakers.

Classical Arabic is often heard at mosques and madrasas as the sacred language of Islam.

=== Religion ===
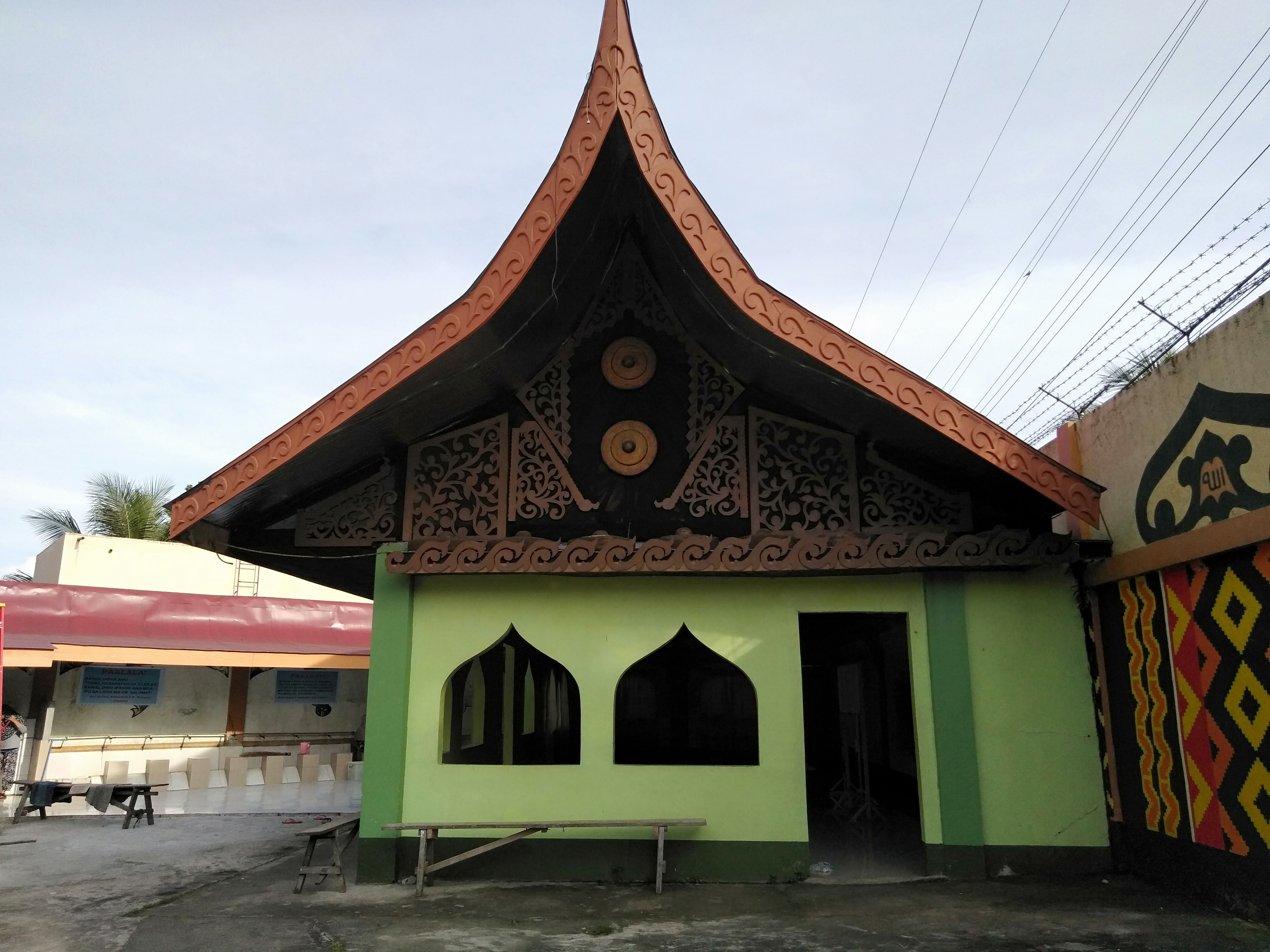
CRMC Mosque, displaying traditional Maguindanao architecture

As reported by Philippine Statistics Authority (PSA) on 2015, 76% of the people of Cotabato City are adherents of Sunni Islam. The followers of Islam are mainly Maguindanaon, Iranun, Maranao, and Tausug. The remaining proportion belong to non - Islamic belief such as Catholicism, Buddhism, and other sects.

Cotabato City also hosts the largest mosque in the Philippines, the Sultan Haji Hassanal Bolkiah Masjid which can accommodate approximately 15,000 worshippers. Cotabato City is also the seat of the Archdiocese of Cotabato which serves its Christian population. The city also hosts the historic Church of the Immaculate Concepcion Tamontaka.

Festivals religious of origin are also held in the city annually, such as the Shariff Kabunsuan Festival which is dedicated to Sharif Kabungsuwan, a Muslim missionary who introduced Islam in the area. The Feast of the Immaculate Conception is also observed, since the Immaculate Conception is regarded as the patron saint of the city by its Catholic population.

== Government ==
Cotabato City Hall

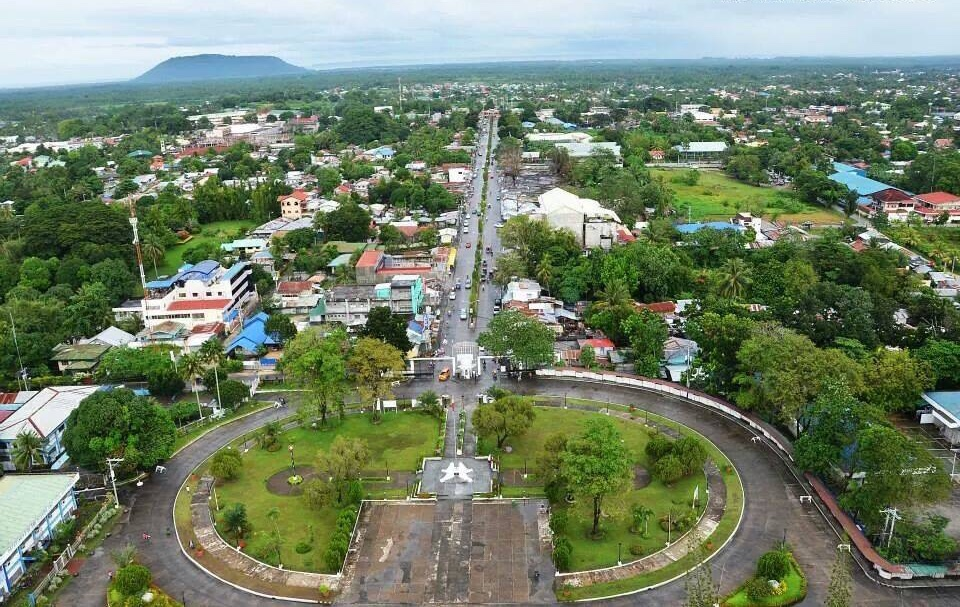
Drone shot in Bangsamoro Government Center, Cotabato City

Elected officials 2025–present:

- Mayor:
  - Bruce Dela Cruz Matabalao (UBJP)
- Vice Mayor:
  - Johair Madag (UBJP)
- City Councilors:
  - Popoy Formento (UBJP)
  - Kap Jonas Mohammad (UBJP)
  - Datu Raiz Sema (UBJP)
  - Michael Datumanong (UBJP)
  - Atty. Anwar Malang (UBJP)
  - Faidz Edzla (UBJP)
  - Guiadzuri Midtimbang II (UBJP)
  - Mohamad Ali Mangelen (UBJP)
  - Joven Pangilan (UBJP)
  - Shalimar Candao (UBJP)

=== List of former chief executives ===
- Justino Marquez - first municipal president (1912–1914)
- Jose Heras - second municipal president (1913–1932)
- Jose S. Lim Sr. - third municipal president (1932–1937)

1935 Philippine Constitution

- Aurelio Casanova (1937–1938) appointed
- Alejandro Doroteo - The first elected mayor in the Municipality of Cotabato under the 1935 Philippine Constitution, 1938–1941
- Jose S. Lim Sr second elected municipal mayor (1941–1944)
- Pacifico Gutierrez - military mayor (1944–1945)
- Datu Mando U. Sinsuat - 1947–1951 (municipality); 1952–November 16, 1967 (city)
- Andres Alonzo (1946–v1950)
- Teodoro V. Juliano - November 17, 1967 – February 2, 1975; March–1980–March–1984
- Juan J. Ty - February 3, 1975 – February 28, 1980; (won electoral protest against Teodoro V Juliano) March 5, 1984 – March 30, 1986
- Ludovico D. Badoy - March 30, 1986 – December 2, 1987; May 1988 – 1992; 1992–1995; 1995–1998
- Officer-in-Charge
  - Arthur P. Bueno - December 1987–February 1988
  - Lydia Mercado - February 1988–May 1988
- Muslimin Sema - January 1998 – 2001; 2001–2004; 2004–2007; 2007–2010
- Rodel M. Mañara (Won thru electoral protest against Muslimin Sema) - January 2001–March 2001
- Japal Guiani Jr. - May–2010–June 30, 2013; June 30, 2013, to–May 30, 2016; May 30, 2016 – September 22, 2016 (deceased)
- Cynthia Guiani-Sayadi - September 22, 2016 – May 13, 2019 (Law of succession); May 13, 2019 – June 30, 2022.

== Economy ==
Poverty Incidence of Cotabato City

Source: Philippine Statistics Authority

Cotabato City serves as the commercial, industrial, financial, educational, healthcare, and regional center of the Bangsamoro Region and Central Mindanao. Situated strategically at the heart of Mindanao, the city boasts road links and public transport connectivity to all major cities on the island, including Davao, Cagayan de Oro, Zamboanga City, Dipolog, and General Santos.

In 2019, the city government reported approximately 1.2 billion pesos in new investments, resulting in the establishment of 1,368 new businesses. This robust economic growth contributed to the city's total annual income of 1.044 billion pesos for the same year. Over the past five years, Cotabato City has experienced an average annual income growth rate of 10.51 percent. Additionally, in 2019, Cotabato City was recognized as the second most competitive component city in Mindanao and the most competitive city in Region 12 for three consecutive years based on the annual ranking of the Cities Municipalities Competitiveness Index (CMCI).

The Gross Domestic Product (GDP) of Cotabato City in 2022 reached 72,091,571,637.36 pesos or 221,766.35 per Capita GDP comparable to Tunisia. Reports also indicate that Cotabato City ranks as the third city in Mindanao in terms of highest bank deposits, trailing behind Davao City and Cagayan De Oro City.

=== Commercial Retail and Banking Center ===
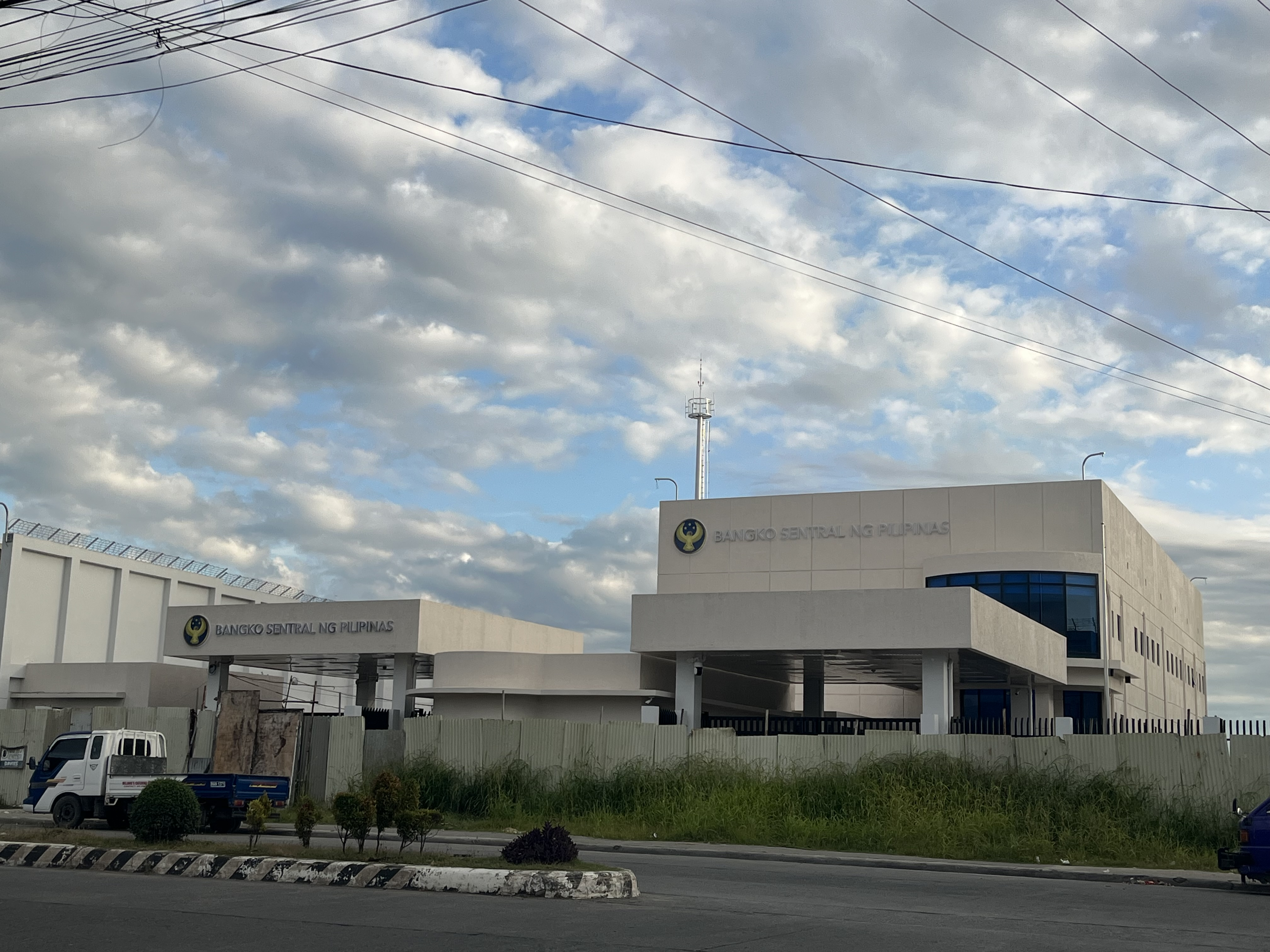
Bangko Sentral ng Pilipinas - Cotabato City Branch 2023

Cotabato City ranks as the third highest in bank deposits in Mindanao, totaling Php 88.66 billion as of June 30, 2021, attributable to robust economic activity. Recognizing the city's significance, the Bangko Sentral ng Pilipinas established its Central Mindanao branch within Cotabato City.

The city boasts a mix of local and national shopping centers. Local establishments such as Superama, Sugni, Mall of Alnor, and Southseas Mall compete with national retailers like CityMall, Puregold, Robinsons Supermarket and Department Store, SM Savemore, as well as Centro Department Store, Mi Department Store, and Fiesta Shopping Center, which are present in selected locations nationwide. Cotabato City stands out as one of the fastest-growing economies in the Soccsksargen region.

KCC Mall of Cotabato City had started its full blown construction on July 1, 2020. It is located along Quezon Avenue corner Sinsuat Avenue, & the project is estimated to cost 11 billion pesos, the mall is four storey tall with a total lot area of 11 hectares; on the second phase of construction is the completion of eleven storey hotel with a convention center, probably upon completion this could be the tallest building in Region XII. NCCC Malls, a Davao-based mall company have also confirmed their interest to build a mall within the city. KCC Mall Of Cotabato will set to open by April 2, 2025.

=== Agro-Industrial ===
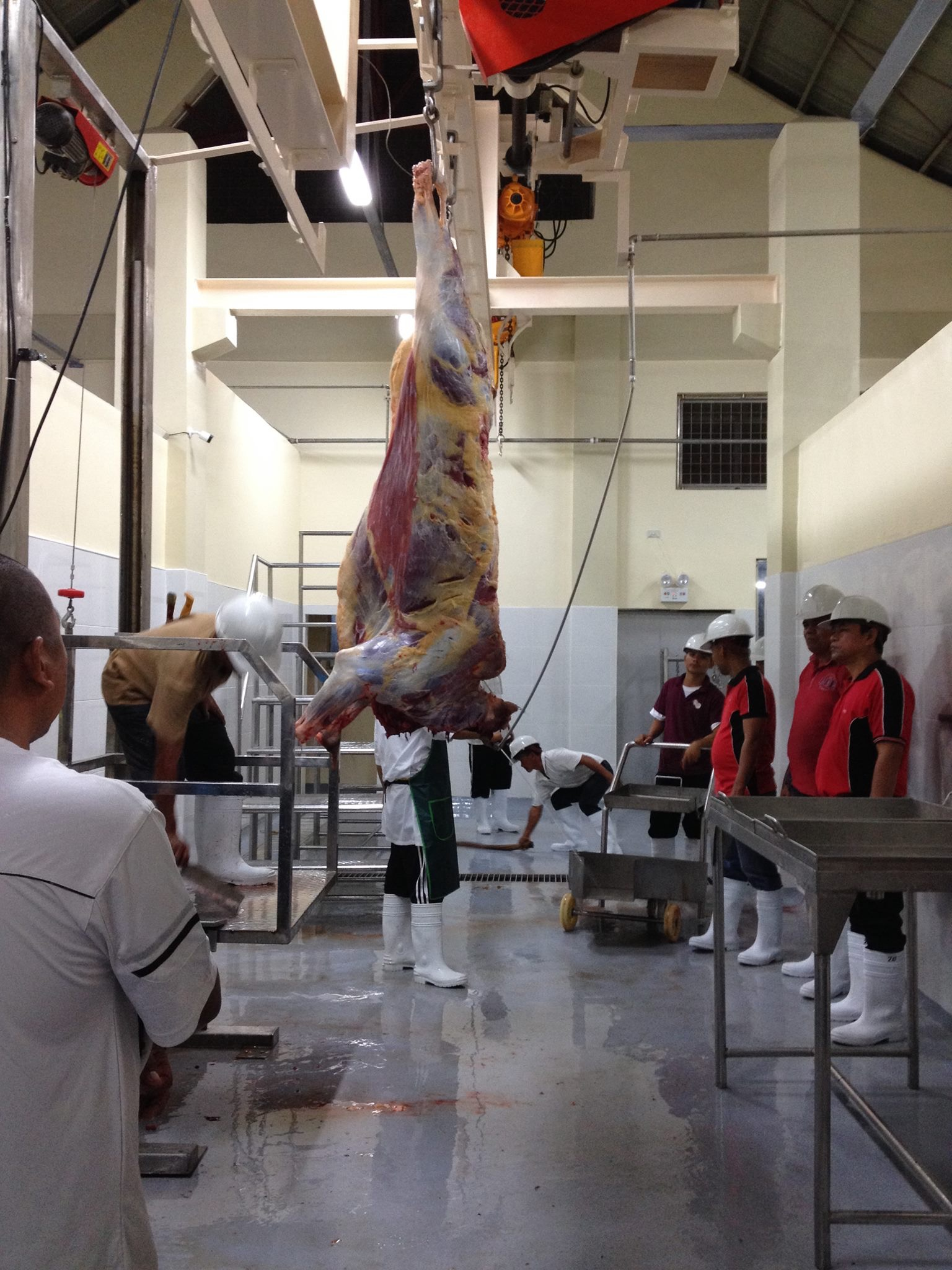
City "Double A" Standard Halal Slaughterhouse

Cotabato City has a more or less 1,700 hectares of fishponds which has an annual production of 500,000 kg of mangrove crabs, prawn and milkfish.

Aiming to be the halal hub of the Philippines, the City Government and Malaysian Businessman built a Class AA halal slaughter house in Baranggay Kalangan II in the city primary serving the entire Central Mindanao, the Halal slaughter house generates a gross income of 4,642,135.00 pesos in 2018.

The city has different factories for cooking oil, coffee, corn starch, processed food and furniture operating within the city.

== Tourism ==
Recently the number of hotels, inn and pension houses increases, in 2015 the city post an all-time high tourist arrivals growth of 241.01% highest on region 12, and Cotabato City has a 63.97% hotel occupancy rate, rank 1 in region 12.

=== Festivals ===
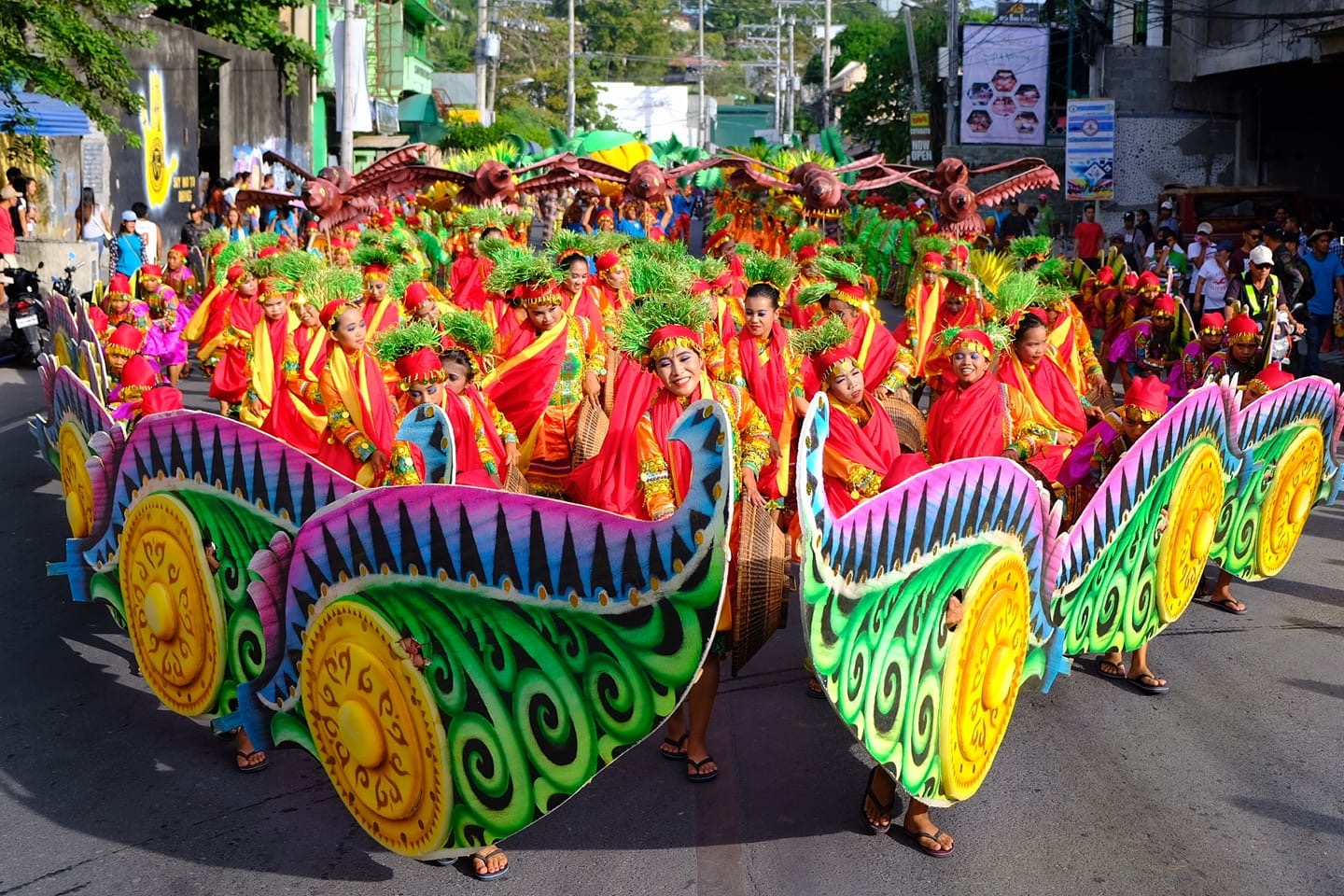
2018 Kuyog street dancing competition

- Feast of the Immaculate Conception - a celebration of Our Lady of the Immaculate Conception, the patron saint of the city. The festival starts from December 1 to 8. The activities are mostly participated by different Catholic schools.
- Shariff Kabunsuan Festival – this festival is celebrated every December 15–19, which is celebrated in honor of Shariff Mohammad Kabunsuan, an Arab missionary from Johore who planted the seed of Islam in Central Mindanao. On this event, certain presentations are performed such as dances. There are also many recreational activities and sports. Highlights in this festival are Dance Parade, Banca Race and the re-enactment of Shariff's arrival.
- Araw ng Kutabato (Cotabato Day) – celebrated every June 12–25, this is the biggest celebration in all of the city's festivals. This festival is held to commemorate the city's charter day.
- Festival of Lights - A Christmas celebration organized by the Notre Dame schools in Cotabato City, celebrated every December of the year.
- Ramadhan - Being a Muslim majority, the city is one in celebrating the holy month of Ramadhan, both the city local government unit and the Bangsamoro Region are establishing their own Ramadhan Fair and different activities.
- Layagan Festival - is a Crabs Festival held and organized in the Barangay of Mother Kalanganan, the event is conducted every December, Barangay Kalanganan produces hundred of tons of crabs annually making it as the crabs capital of Soccsksargen.

=== Attractions ===
- Cotabato City Grand Mosque: Noted as the largest mosque in the Philippines, also known as Sultan Haji Hassanal Bolkiah Mosque
- Tantawan Park: Historical landmark in Cotabato City located at the foot of PC Hill where Shariff Kabunsuan is believed to docked his boat in his missionary trip to plant Islamic faith in Central Mindanao. A Maguindanao watchtower stood on this land for the defence of the Maguindanao Sultanate from Spanish invasions from 1635 to 1645.
- Tamontaka Church: The oldest church in Cotabato City built by the Jesuits in 1872
- Rio Grande de Mindanao: The second largest river system in the Philippines
- Kutawato Caves: The only cave system in the country, situated within the city proper. The Kutawato Caves is located at the foot of Pedro Colina Hill.
- Cotabato City Bai Walk: the river revetment turned into riverside park.
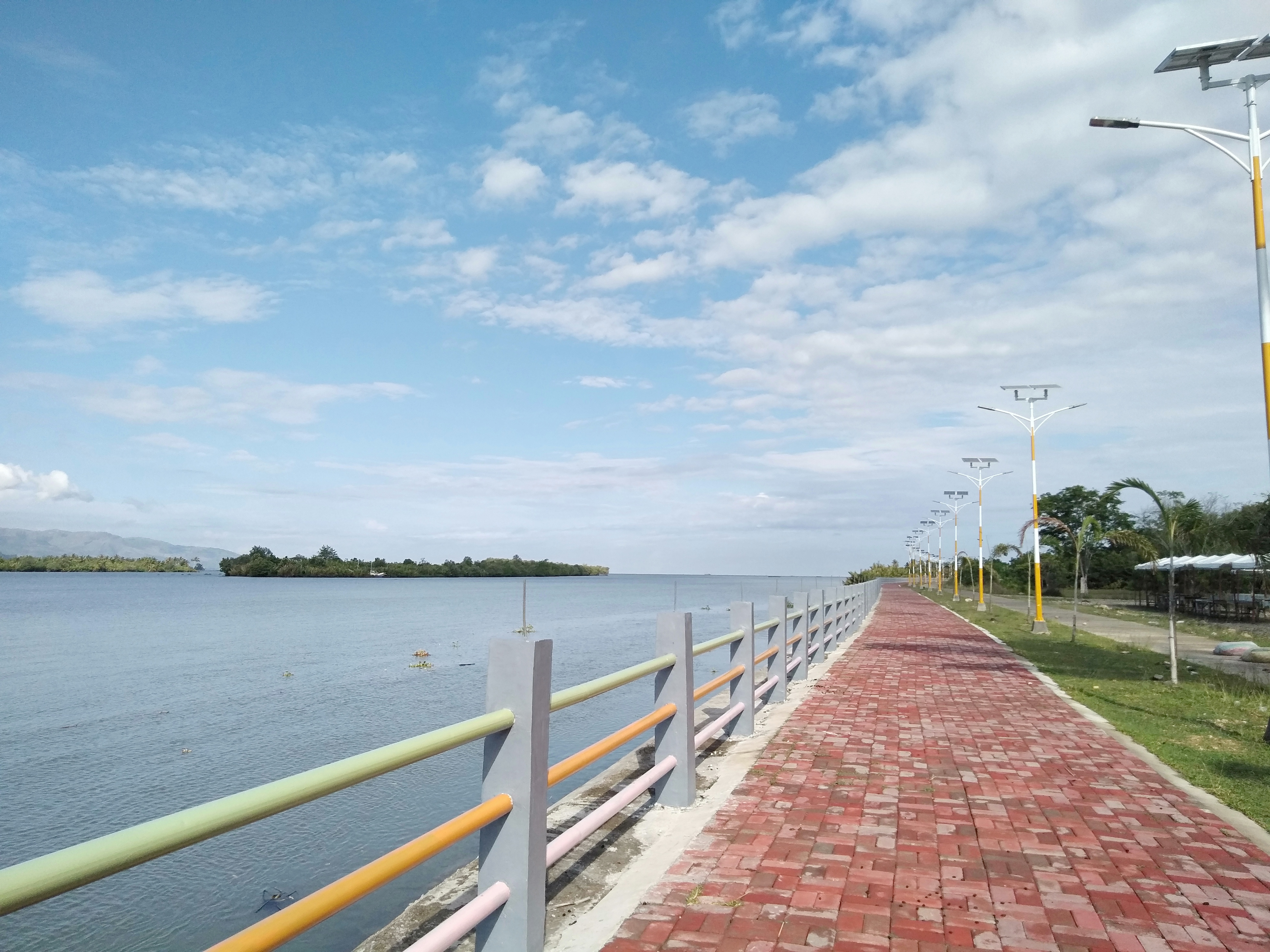
Cotabato City Bai Walk

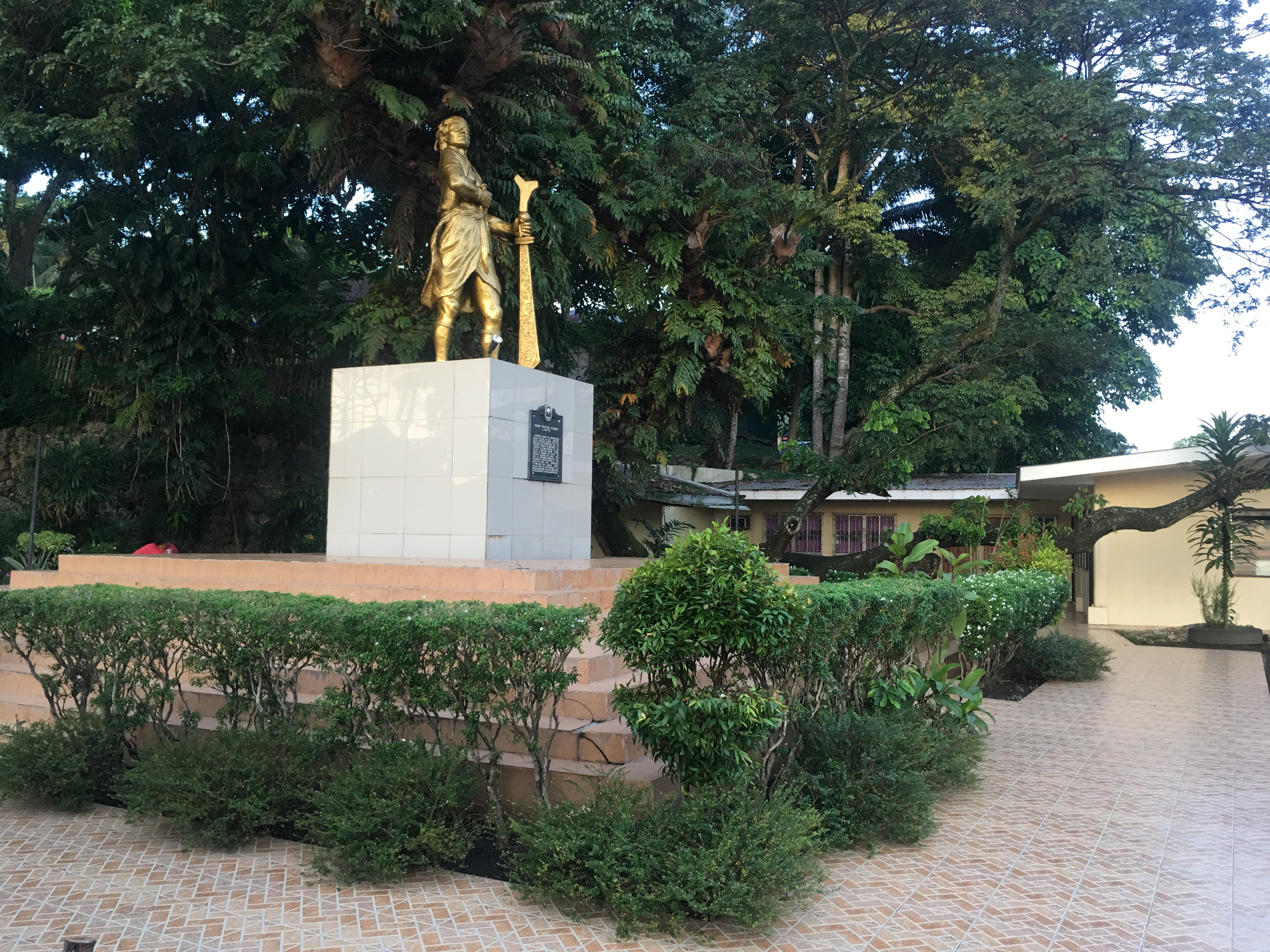
Tantawan Park and its statue of Sultan Muhammad Kudarat of Maguindanao

== Infrastructure ==
=== Transportation ===
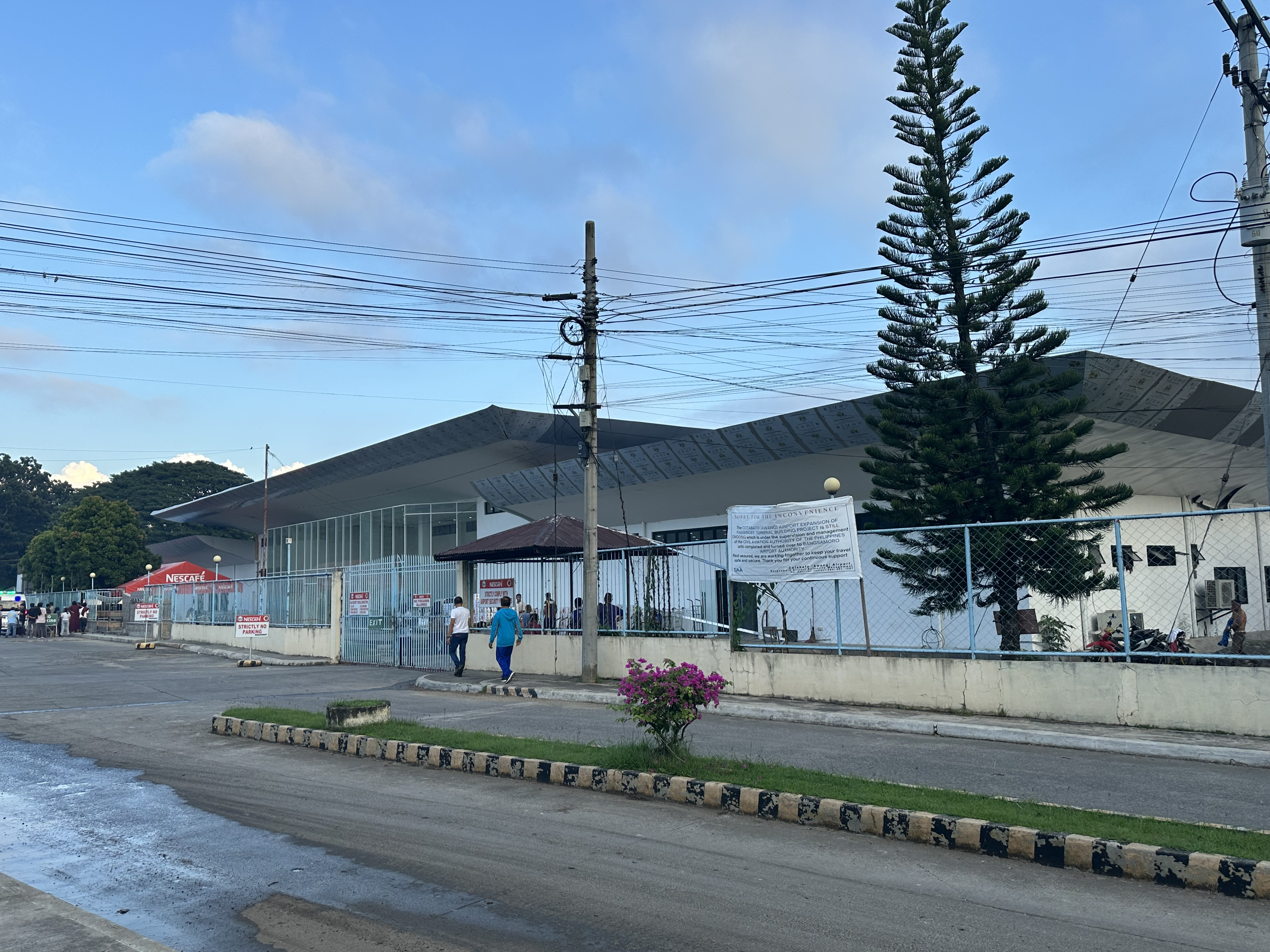
Arrival Area of Cotabato Airport

Cotabato City has become a pivotal hub for bus route transport connectivity, linking it to major cities across Mindanao. To the east, routes extend to General Santos City, South Cotabato, and Sultan Kudarat Provinces. To the north, Additionally, recent developments have expanded connectivity to the western side of Mindanao, including cities such as Dipolog, Pagadian, and Zamboanga.

Furthermore, Cotabato City is linked to the island provinces of Basilan and Tawi-Tawi through Ro-ro services, while Philippine Airlines provides air connectivity to Tawi-Tawi.

Air

Flights going to Cotabato City can be reached via Cotabato Airport which is currently situated in Datu Odin Sinsuat, an adjacent town from the city.

Direct flights to and from Manila are provided by PAL and Cebu Pacific, and last June 9, 2022, direct Cotabato to Tawi-Tawi and vice versa flights commenced via PAL.

Land

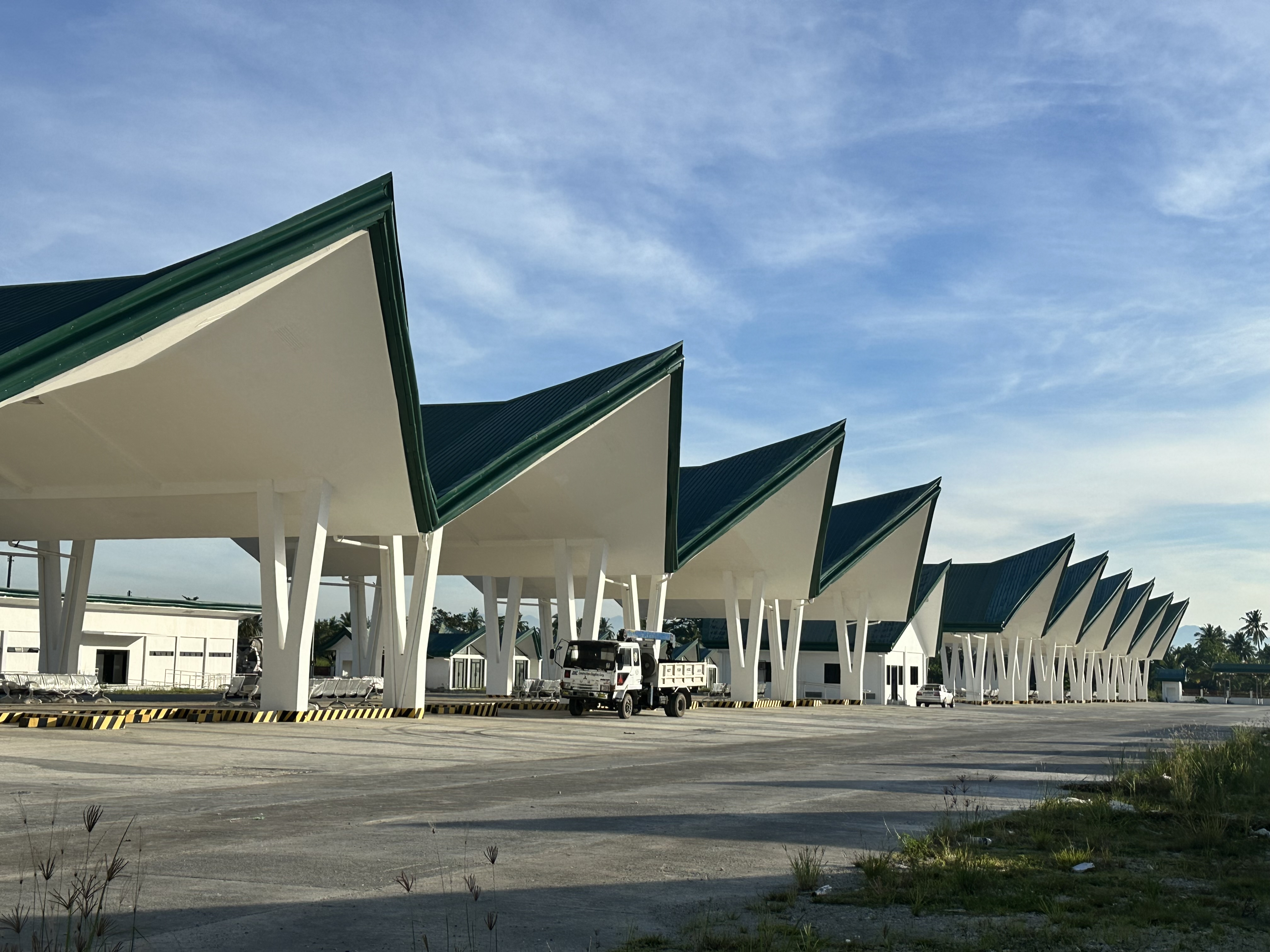
Cotabato City Public Terminal

Modified Toyota Townace and Modified Suzuki Multicab are the usual means of transportation routing the city, while tricycle are only roaming within downtown area. Single motor transport known as Habal-habal are also available around in some location. There are also taxi company operating within city or nearby municipality.

Inter-city bus transportations are accessible with these Bus Companies listed below. There are also Shuttle Vans currently operating in the city that travels to Lebak, Kalamansig, Marawi, Iligan, Parang, Upi, Kabuntalan and even to various towns in BARMM, SOCCSARGEN, and Zamboanga Peninsula,

Bus companies operating in Cotabato City:

- Husky Tours: Cotabato City to General Santos - vice versa via Shariff Aguak, Isulan, Tacurong and Koronadal City
- Mindanao Star Bus: Cotabato City to Davao City - vice versa via Kidapawan, Midsayap, Kabacan, Digos
- Rural Transit: Dipolog to Cotabato City and vice versa. Cotabato City to General Santos City via Shariff Aguak, and Isulan or Midsayap, and Kabacan, Tacurong City and Koronadal City
- Rural Transit: Zamboanga City to Cotabato City and vice versa.

=== Utilities ===
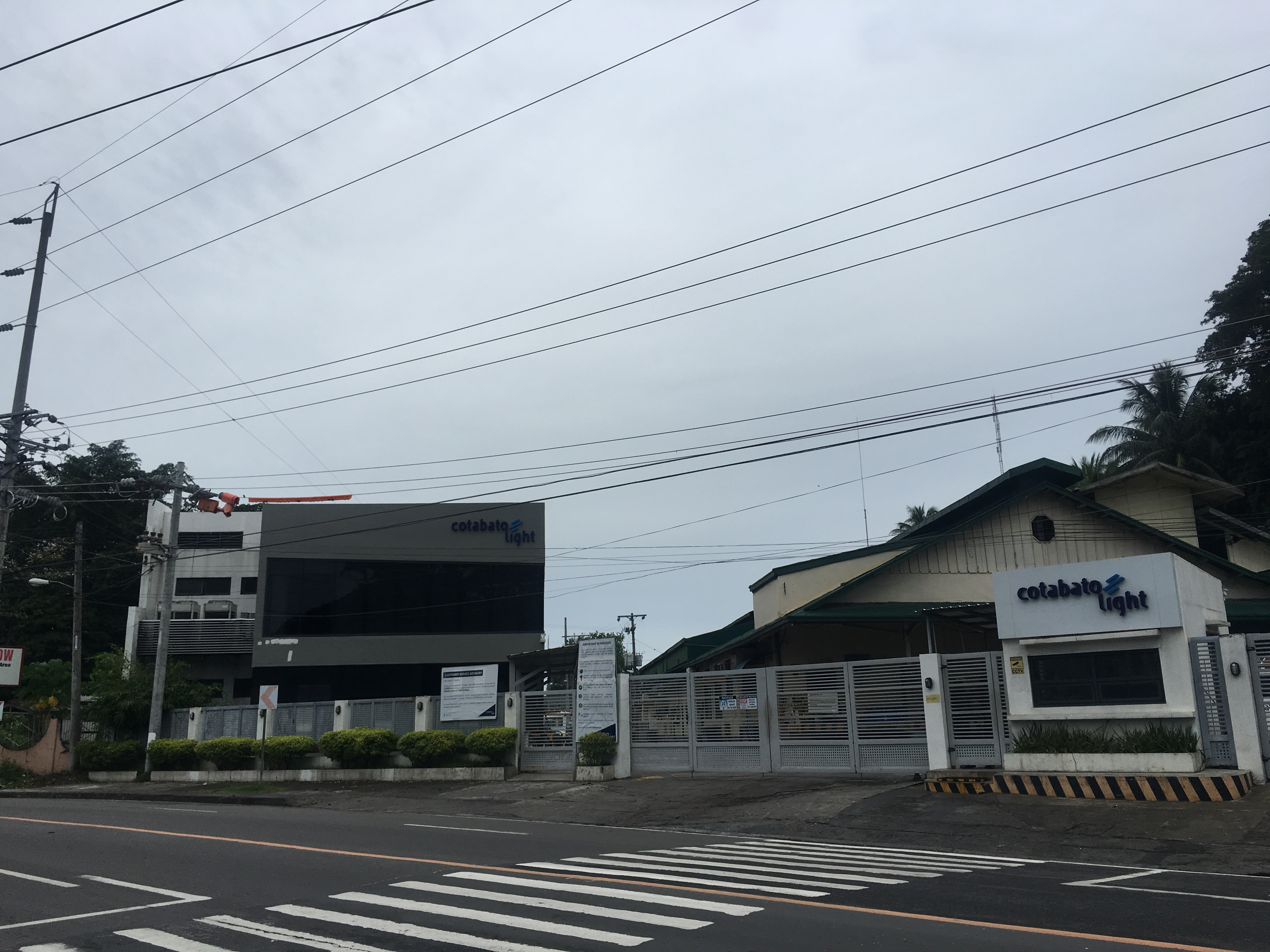
Cotabato Light and Power Company Building along Sinsuat Avenue, July 2020

Power is handled by Cotabato Light and Power Company, a private firm owned by Aboitiz who gets power resources from the National Grid Corporation of the Philippines. (NGCP). It also operates a bunker fuel-fired stand-by power engines to address emergency situations like power failures, trip-offs and fluctuations.

Metro Cotabato Water District is the main water supplier in the city. It has an active connection of 29,960. It resources are located in Barangay Dimapatoy, Datu Odin Sinsuat, Maguindanao del Norte.

Telecommunications are handled by PLDT or Philippine Long Distance Company, Smart Communications, Globe Telecom, and Dito Telcom. Internet Service provider in the city are PLDT, Smart, Globe, and Dito. Cable services are being handled by local-based Cotabato Cable and national-based Cignal and Sky Cable.

=== Healthcare ===
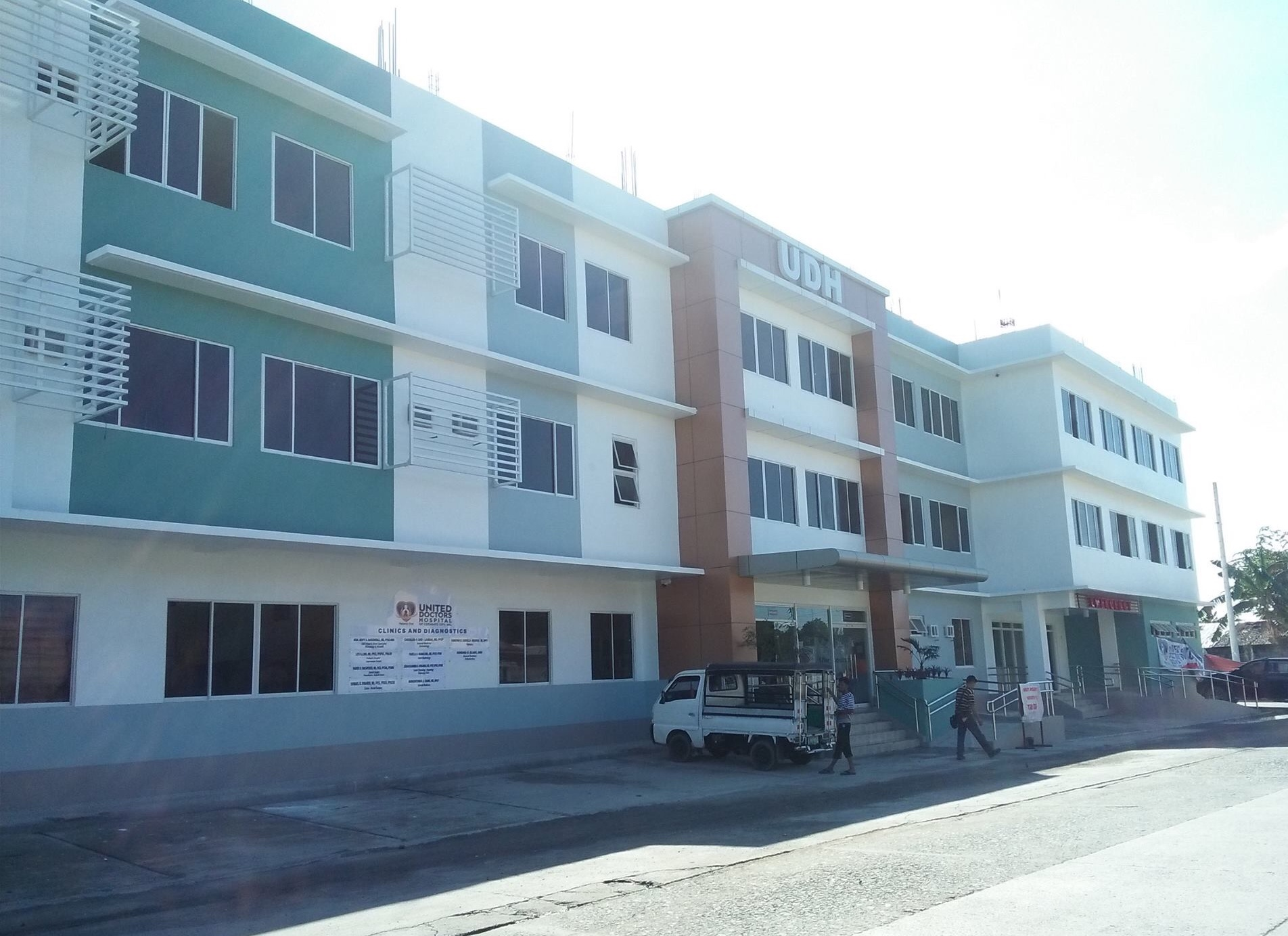
United Doctors Hospital Cotabato along Notre Dame Avenue

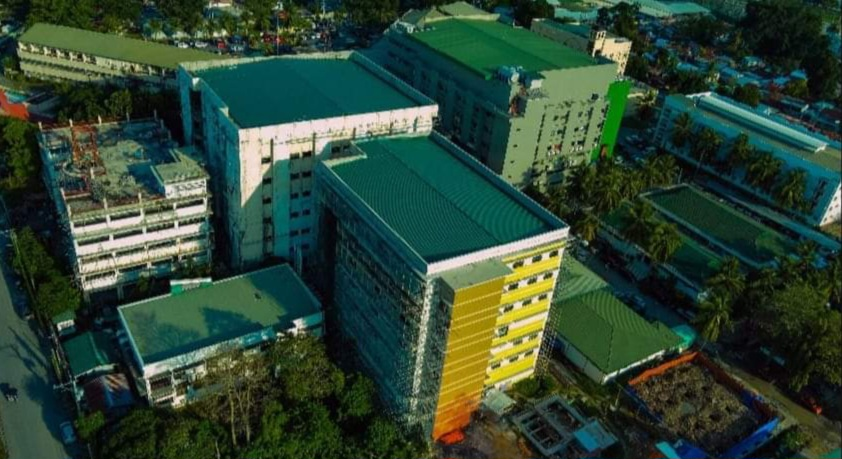
Cotabato Regional and Medical Center

Cotabato City is the health care center of Central Mindanao catering both mainland of Bangsamoro Region and Central Mindanao, Soccsksargen regional hospital is situated in the city named as Cotabato Regional and Medical Center with its 600-bed capacity it has become the largest hospital in the entire region 12. Cotabato City also has 8 more private hospitals. Below is the list of current operating hospitals in the city.

- Cotabato Regional and Medical Center – Sinsuat Avenue.
- Notre Dame Hospital – Sinsuat Avenue
- Bangsamoro Doctors Hospital (Formerly Cotabato Medical Specialist Hospital) – Quezon Avenue
- United Doctors Hospital of Cotabato City – Notre Dame Avenue
- Dr. P. Ocampo Hospital – De Mazenod Avenue
- Cotabato Doctors Clinic and Hospital – Sinsuat Avenue
- Cotabato Puericulture Center and General Hospital Foundation, Inc. – Jose Lim Sr. St.
- Cotabato Polymedic and Diagnostic Center - Governor Gutierez Avenue
- Eros Medical Clinic and Hospital - Bubong Road, Barangay Tamontaka
- Shahada Medical Diagnostic Clinic - Sousa St. Barangay Rosary Heights 13

== Media ==
Abbreviations: TV-Television, FM-Frequency Modulation, AM-Amplitude Modulation, Mhz-Megahertz, Ch-Channel
^{*}franchised, ^{**}affiliated, ^{***}substation/subsidiary

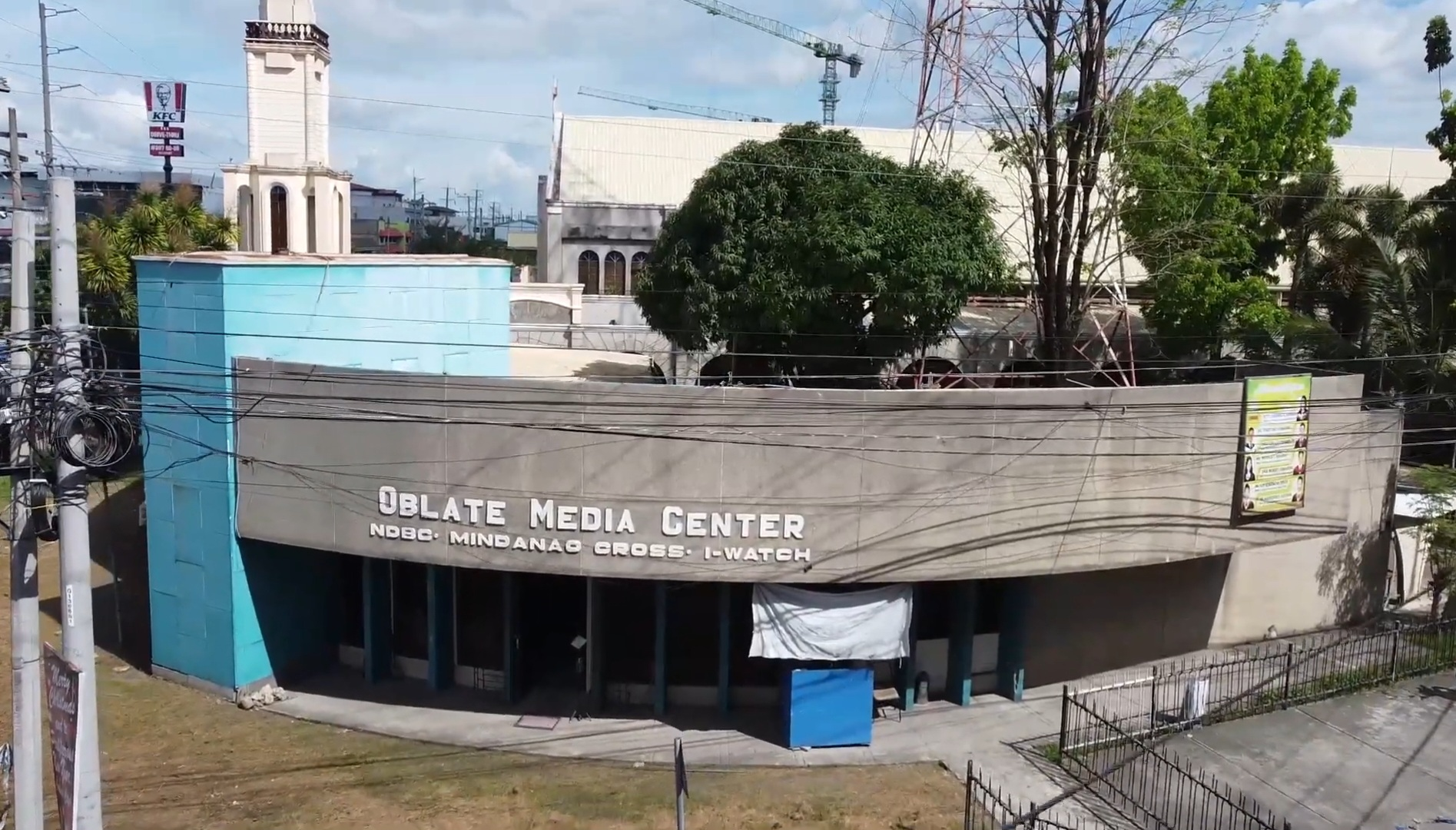
Oblate Media Center, Notre Dame Broadcasting Corporation, Cotabato City, 2023

Owner	Location	Platform	Channel	Year Established
Notre Dame Broadcasting Corporation	Quezon Ave Corner Sinsuat Avenue, Cotabato City	Radio; Television; Digital; Newspaper	DXMS Radyo Bida 882kHz Cotabato; DXOL Happy FM 92.7 Cotabato; Radyo Bida Teleradyo Ch 3 (Maguindanao Skycable); OMI TV YouTube; The Mindanao Cross	1956
Radio Mindanao Network	Studios is located at Esteros, Brgy. Rosary Heights X, Cotabato City and Transmitter is located at No. 20 Cando Street, Tamontaka II, Cotabato City	Radio	DXMY 90.9 FM Cotabato	1971
Manila Broadcasting Company	PC Hill, Zone 7, Rosary Heights 1, Cotabato City	Radio	DZRH Nationwide 567kHz; 95.9 Radyo Natin Cotabato	1992
Bombo Radyo Philippines	5th Street, corner Don E. Sero, Cotabato City	Radio	93.7 Star FM Cotabato	1998
Far East Broadcasting Company	Al-Hayat Multi-Purpose Building, #1 J. Rosales Street, RH-13, Cotabato City	Radio	106.9 DXGR Radyo Gandingan	2021
iMinds Studio Philippines former ABS-CBN Cotabato Production	Gonzalo Javier St, Cotabato City	Digital	YouTube, Facebook	2020
Bangsamoro Multimedia Network partnership with Al-Balagh Foundation** under Prime Broadcasting Network	Bubong Road, Barangay Datu Balabaran St, Cotabato City	Digital Radio	YouTube, Facebook, Voice FM 92.1 Cotabato	2017
GMA Network, Inc.	Rosary Heights V, Cotabato City	Television	GMA TV-12 Cotabato (DXNS) and GTV Channel 27 (DXMB)	1987
People's Television Network	Don E Sero St, Cotabato City	Television	PTV Ch. 8 Cotabato	1997
Brigada Mass Media Corporation	Sinsuat Avenue, Cotabato City	Radio; Digital	Brigada News FM 89.3 Cotabato; Brigada News Cotabato Facebook	2014
Bandera News Philippines	Juliano Compound, Don E. Sero St, Cotabato City	Radio; Television; Digital	Radyo Bandera News FM 105.3 Cotabato; Bandera News TV Cotabato Ch 4 (Maguindanao Skycable); Bandera News FM/TV YouTube/Facebook	2018
Cotabato Cable TV Network Corporation (acquired by the Cable TV and internet provider is Royal Cable Corporation since February 1, 2027)	Government Gutierrez Avenue, Cotabato City.	Cable; Digital	Facebook	1991
Sky Cable Corporation	R. Rabago Building, Quezon Avenue, Cotabato City	Cable; Digital	Facebook	1996
Philippine Collective Media Corporation	Notre Dame – RVM College of Cotabato, #74 Sinsuat Avenue, Cotabato City	Radio	87.9 Radio Ignacia (FMR Cotabato)	2022
Yes2Health Broadcasting Network	AM Building, 2nd Floor Door 2G, Sinsuat Avenue, Mother Barangay Rosary, Cotabato City	Radio	97.3 XFM Cotabato	2023
Bangsamoro Media Production	Cotabato City	Radio	98.1 Gabay Radio Cotabato	2023
Rizal Memorial Colleges Broadcasting Corporation	2nd Floor, Stall No. 3, Corner De Mazenod Street, Barangay R.H.V., Cotabato City	Radio	102.1 Juander Radyo Cotabato	2026

== Education ==
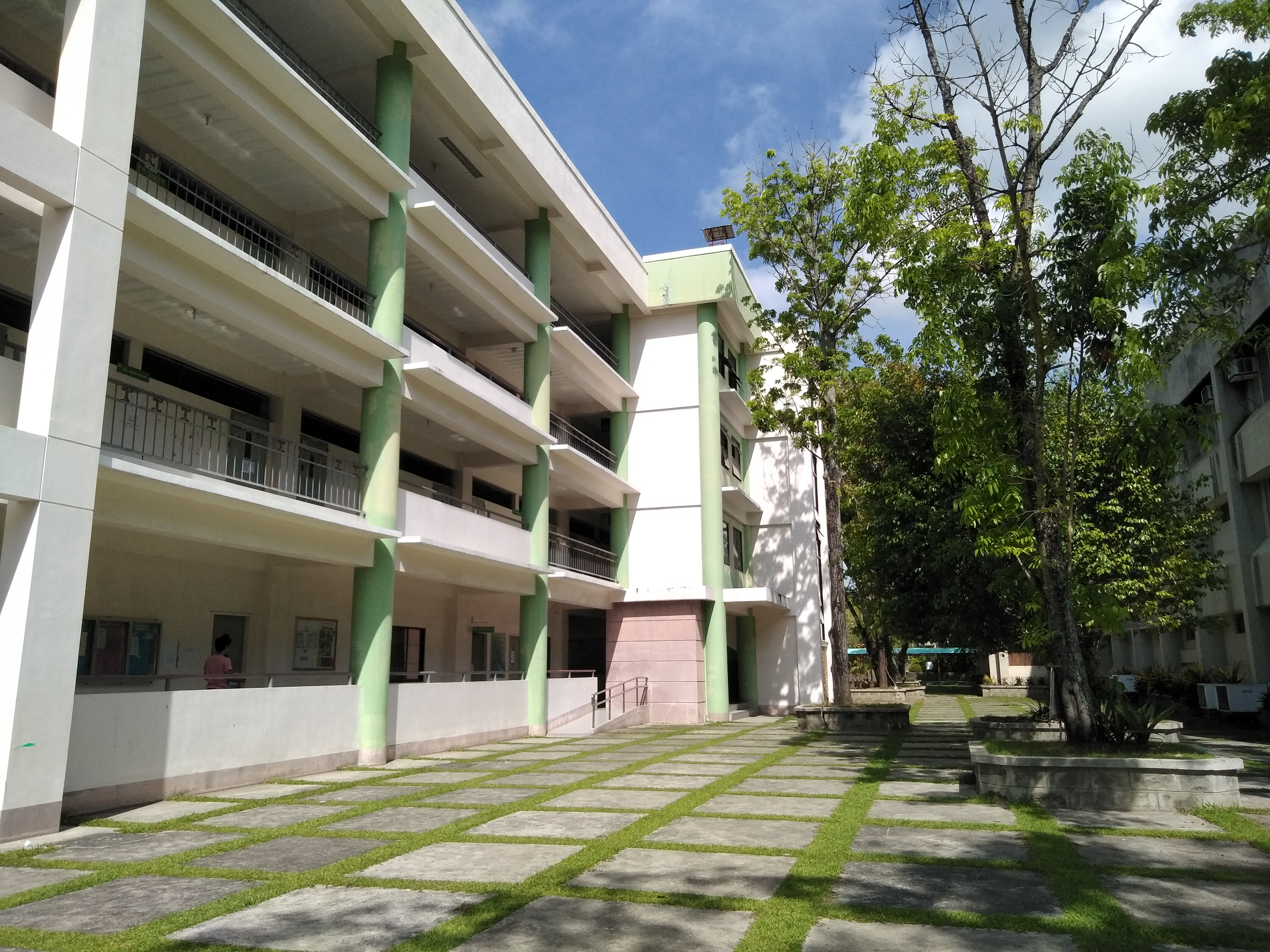
Cariño Building, Notre Dame University

Cotabato City is home to 18 private colleges and two universities. According to a report from the Department of Education, the city had a total of 14,228 enrollees in higher education (colleges and universities) during the 2017–2018 school year. Among the higher education institutions in Central Mindanao, Notre Dame University (NDU) stands out. NDU is the first university in the Notre Dame system in Asia and was recognized as the best accountancy school in Mindanao in 2018. It also ranked as the 9th top-performing school in the May 2023 Nursing Board Exam, with a passing rate of 96.64%, as 115 out of 119 examinees successfully passed.

Additionally, the Cotabato City State Polytechnic College was converted into Cotabato State University by Republic Act 10585, becoming the second university in the city, with the change taking effect in April 2021.

=== Higher Education ===
- Notre Dame University
- Cotabato State University - Sinsuat Avenue, Cotabato City
- Notre Dame – RVM College of Cotabato
- Cotabato City Institute, Inc. (古島中華中學)
- St. Benedict College, Inc.
- Doctor P. Ocampo Colleges, Inc.
- Aviation Technical School of Cotabato
- Jamiat Cotabato and Institute of Technology
- Academia De Technologia in Mindanao
- Headstart College of Cotabato
- Notre Dame Hospital Siena College of Cotabato Inc
- STI College Cotabato
- AMA Computer University
- Coland Systems Technology College Inc.
- Antonio R. Pacheco College
- Dela Vida College
- Mindanao Capitols Colleges
- Shariff Kabunsuan College, Inc.
- Kutawato Darusallam College
- Computer Aided Design and Information Technology Institute, Inc.
- Notre Dame Of Cotabato

=== Defunct schools in Cotabato City ===
- University of Mindanao - Located at Bishop Mongeau Ave., Cotabato City, Maguindanao del Norte
- Philippine Harvardian Colleges - Located at Quezon Avenue, Cotabato City now El Manuel Hotel and Citi Hardware
- University of Southern Mindanao (Cotabato Campus)
- Cotabato City Central Colleges - Located at Sinsuat avenue, now transferred in Koronadal and renamed as Regency Polytechnic College

=== Other schools ===
- San Vicente Academy (1990)

== Notable personalities ==
- Orlando Quevedo – Cardinal of the Roman Catholic Church, Archbishop of Cotabato
- Noel Felongco - Lead Convenor of National Anti-Poverty Commission
- Imah Dumagay - Stand-up comedian based in Dubai
- Romero Duno - Professional Boxer
- Jay Jaboneta - Blogger, Philanthropist, Media Advocate, and Online Community Organizer
- Kublai Millan - Prolific Artist
- Ben Farrales - Fashion Designer, known for his Muslim inspired terno designs

== Sister cities ==
Cotabato City is twinned with:

=== Local ===
==== Cities ====
- Naga City, Camarines Sur
- Quezon City (since June 1987)
- General Santos City
- Kidapawan City, Cotabato
- Koronadal City, South Cotabato
- Tacurong City, Sultan Kudarat

==== Municipalities ====
- Malita, Davao Occidental
- Midsayap, Cotabato
- Parang, Maguindanao del Norte
- Sultan Kudarat, Maguindanao del Norte

=== International ===
- Johor Bahru, Johor, Malaysia
- Bandung, West Java, Indonesia
