= Voice FM (Cotabato) =

Radio station in Cotabato City, Philippines

Voice FM Cotabato
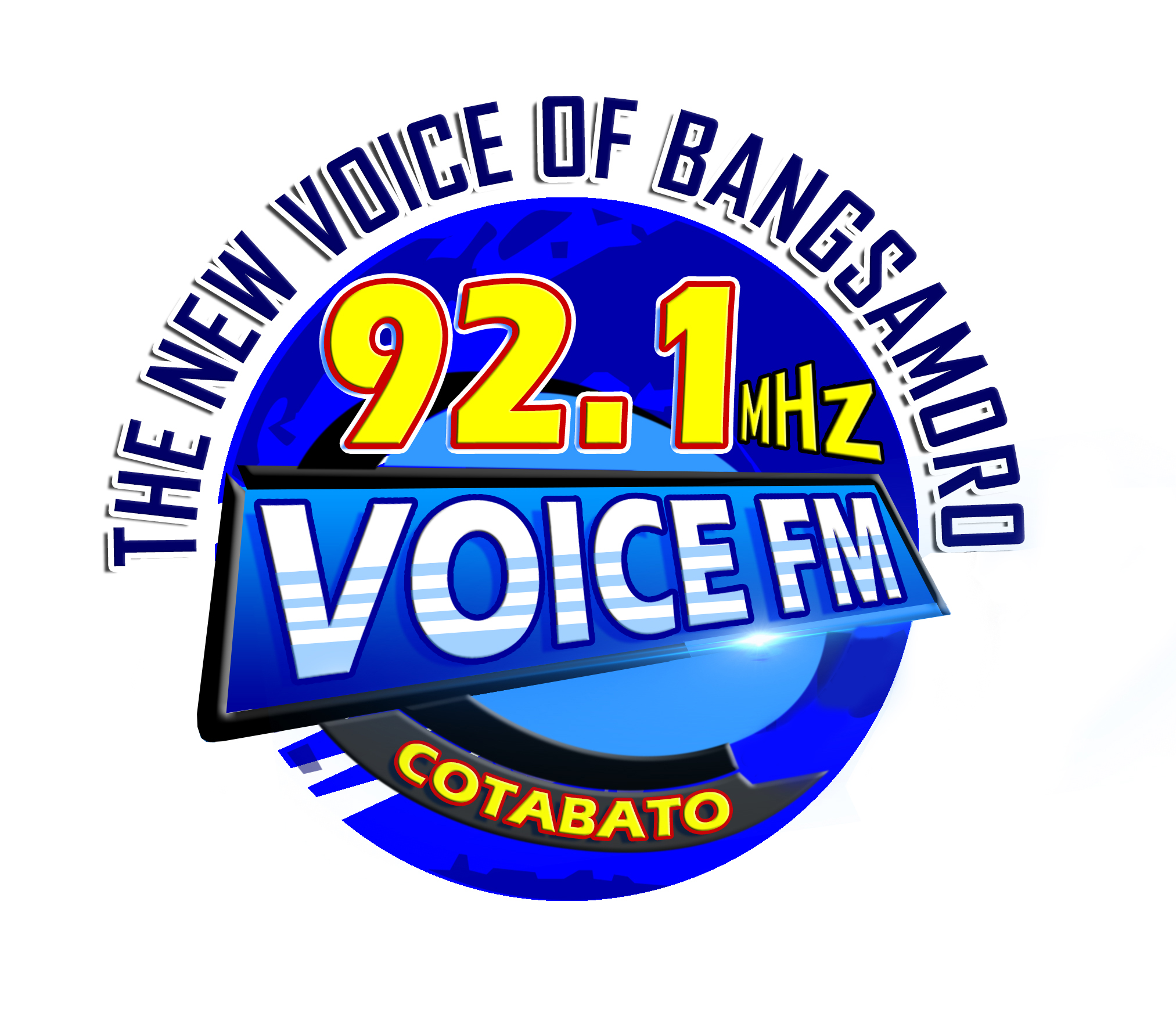
- Cotabato City; Philippines
- Broadcast area: Maguindanao del Norte and surrounding areas
- Frequency: 92.1 MHz
- Branding: 92.1 Voice FM

Programming
- Languages: Maguindanaon, Filipino
- Format: Community radio

Ownership
- Owner: Prime Broadcasting Network
- Operator: Al-Balagh Foundation

History
- First air date: March 8, 2015
- Former frequencies: 99.0 MHz (2015–2021)

Technical information
- Power: 5,000 watts

Links
- Website: Website

92.1 Voice FM (92.1 FM) is a community radio station owned by Prime Broadcasting Network and operated by the Al-Balagh Foundation. The station's studio is located on the 3rd Floor, Jamiat Cotabato Bldg., Bubong Rd., Brgy. Datu Balabaran, Cotabato City.
