= List of tautological place names =

Toponyms composed of synonyms

A place name is tautological if two differently sounding parts of it are synonymous. This often occurs when a name from one language is imported into another and a standard descriptor is added on from the second language. Thus, for example, New Zealand's Mount Maunganui is tautological since "maunganui" is Māori for "great mountain". The following is a list of place names often used tautologically, plus the languages from which the non-English name elements have come.

Tautological place names are systematically generated in languages such as English and Russian, where the type of the feature is systematically added to a name regardless of whether it contains it already. For example, in Russian, the format "Ozero X-ozero" (i.e. "Lake X-lake") is used. In English, it is usual to do the same for foreign names, even if they already describe the feature, for example Lake Kemijärvi (Lake Kemi-lake), Faroe Islands (literally Sheep-Island Islands, as øy is Modern Faroese for Island), or Saaremaa island (Island land island).

On rare occasions, such formations may occur by coincidence when a place is named after a person who shares their name with the feature. Examples in English include the Outerbridge Crossing, named after Eugenius Harvey Outerbridge, the Hall Building of Concordia University, named after Henry Foss Hall, and Alice Keck Park Memorial Gardens in Santa Barbara, named after Alice Keck Park.

== List ==
Asterisks (*) indicate examples that are also commonly referred to without the inclusion of one of the tautological elements.

=== Headlands ===
- Cow Neck, Long Island, United States – when called Cow Neck Peninsula, as "neck" is a very common word for peninsula in Long Island and southern New England (see, for instance, neighboring Great Neck, New York).
- Broadneck, Maryland, United States – when called Broadneck Peninsula, for the same reason as Cow Neck above.

=== Rivers ===
- Aabach (disambiguation page), several streams in Germany and Switzerland, "aa" means a course of water, and "bach" means a creek or stream.
- Amu Darya in Central Asia is sometimes referred to as the Amu Darya River which in Turkic languages would mean 'Amu River River'. The word "Darya" derives from Classical Persian word دریا which could mean both a sea or a river.
- River Avon, various in England and Scotland, and Avon River, in various parts of the world (River River – Brythonic, Modern Welsh Afon, or Goidelic abhainn)
- River Avonbeg, County Wicklow, Ireland (Small River River – Irish: Abhainn Bheag)
- River Avonmore, County Wicklow, Ireland (Big River River – Irish: Abhainn Mhór)
- River Awbeg, County Cork, Ireland (Small River River – Irish: Abhainn Bheag)
- Batang Hari River, Jambi Province, Indonesia (Hari River River – Indonesian: Sungai Batang Hari)
- River Bourne, various in England meaning "River stream".
- Caloosahatchee River, Florida, United States (Hatchee = river – Caloosa River River)
- Connecticut River, United States (Long Tidal River River – Mohegan-Pequot)
- Coosawhatchie River, South Carolina, United States (Hatchie = river)
- Cuyahoga River, Ohio (Cuyahoga derives from the Mohawk word for "crooked river")
- Elbe (Low German "Elv"), Germany, from Norse elv / Swedish älv – "river"
- Fishkill Creek, Catskill Creek, and Schuylkill River ("skulking river river"), eastern US (-kill means "creek, small river" in Dutch, so "-creek Creek", "-river River")
- Río Flumen, northern Spain. Río and flumen are respectively Spanish and Latin for 'river'.
- Futaleufú River, Argentina and Chile (Big River River – Mapuche).
- Guadalaviar River, Spain (White River River – from Arabic al-wādi al-'abyaḍ, 'White River')
- Guadalentín River, Spain (Muddy River River – from Arabic al-wādi aṭ-ṭīn, 'Muddy River')
- Guadalhorce River, Spain (Scissor-shaped River River – from Arabic al-wādi al and Latin forfex, 'scissors')
- Guadalquivir River, Spain (Great River River – from Arabic wādi al-kabīr, 'Great Valley (or River)')
- Guadiana River, Spain and Portugal (Duck River River – from Arabic wādi, 'river' and iberian anas, 'duck')
- Guadix River, Spain River of Acci River – Guad comes from Arabic wādi 'valley' or 'river', and ix is a corruption of Acci, the name of the town nearest the river during Roman times.
- River Gweebarra, Ireland – from Irish gaoth Bheara, "Beara's river"
- Hatchie River, southern US (River River – hatchie meaning "river" in Muskogean languages)
- River Humber, England, and Humber River, Ontario, Canada (River River – Brythonic)
- Iguaçu River (Rio de Janeiro), Rio de Janeiro, Brazil (Big River River – Iguaçu comes from Tupi 'y, river, and guaçu, big)
- Iguazu River, Brazil and Argentina, (Big River River – Iguazu comes from Tupi 'y, river, and guaçu, big)
- Ipiranga Brook, São Paulo, Brazil (Red River Brook – Ipiranga comes from Tupi 'y, river, and pyrang, red)
- Kymijoki, kymi is old/dialectal Finnish for joki "river".
- Latsa erreka (tributary of the Nive), France (Brook Brook – Basque)
- Lealt River, Scotland ("Lealt" means "Stream with one high bank")
- Loxahatchee River, Florida, United States (Loxa = Turtle & Hatchee = river: Turtle River River)
- Mardi Khola, Nepal – (rdi = stream or river in Khamkura & khola = same in Nepali)
- Mississippi River, US, and Mississippi River, Ontario, Canada (Big River River – Algonquian)
- Mekong River – A triple tautonym. 'Mae' in Thai is an abbreviation for "river", while 'khong' is an old Austroasiatic word for river. Mekong River can thus be translated as "river river river"
- Molopo River, South Africa (River River – Setswana)
- Muvattupuzha River (also known as Muvattupuzhayar), Kerala, India – derived from the Malayalam words moo (three), aattu/aaru (river), puzha (river), and aar (river), literally translating to Three River River River.
- River Ouse, various in England and Scotland (River River – from Brythonic usa meaning water, river or stream).
- Ouseburn River in Newcastle upon Tyne, England (River River River – from Brythonic usa meaning water, river or stream and bourne also meaning stream in Anglo-Saxon).
- Murderkill River, Delaware, US, (Mother River River-Dutch)
- Ohio River, eastern US (Great River River – Iroquoian)
- Ow River, County Wicklow, Ireland (from Irish abha, "river")
- Para Rivers (North Para, South Para, and Little Para), South Australia (from Kaurna parri, "river")
- Paraguay River, Brazil, Bolivia, Paraguay and Argentina (the Great River River – Guaraní)
- Fiume Potamo, a tributary of Mesima (it) in Calabria, Italy – "Potamos" is a Greek word for "river" (see Mesopotamia – "the land between the rivers")
- Raritan River, New Jersey (River Beyond The Island River, Forked River River, or Overflowing River River, depending on which etymology is correct.)
- Reka, Slovenia – the name means literally "river" in Slovene
- Rillito River, Tucson, Pima County (southern Arizona), US (Little River River – Spanish)
- Rječina, Croatia – the name is the augmentative form of the word rijeka, which means "river" in Croatian
- Salkehatchie River, South Carolina, US (Hatchie = river)
- Schuylkill River, Pennsylvania, US – "Schuylkill" meaning "hidden river" in Dutch
- Skookumchuck River and Pilchuck River, Washington, US – the suffix chuck in Chinook Jargon meaning "river"
- Talkeetna River located in Talkeetna, Alaska, meaning "river of plenty"
- Uruguay River, Brazil, Uruguay and Argentina (River of the painted birds River – Guaraní)
- Vaslui River, Romania – uj meant "body of water" in Cuman
- Walla Walla River, Washington, US (Little River River; Walla means "river" in Sahaptin, repeated to express the diminutive ("little river"))
- River Waveney (the "ey" part of the name means "river")
- Winterbourne Stream, East Sussex, UK – winterbourne meaning a stream that flows only in winter.
- River Wissey (the "ey" part of the name means "river")
- Withlacoochee River, Withlacoochee probably comes from the Muskogean word meaning "little river."
- Bakkárholtsá in the Ölfus region of Iceland. The river was originally named Bakká, "Bank River", and then a farm nearby was named Bakkárholt, "Bank River Hill". The river was then later renamed after the farm as Bakkárholtsá, which translates to "Bank River Hill River"
- Most river names in the Sundanese portion of Indonesia start with the prefix ci-, which is Sundanese for "river". Many people refer the names redundantly using both the Indonesian word sungai and prefix ci-, for example, Sungai Ciliwung ("Ciliwung River") translates to Sungai Sungai Liwung ("Liwung River River").
- Many rivers in Ireland contain the element Owen in their name, from Irish abhann, "river." Tautological hydronyms include: Owenaher River, Owenakilla River, Bunowen River, Camowen River, Owenea River, Owenboy River, Owenvarra, Owenkillew River.
- Multiple creeks and rivers in the region surrounding Melbourne, Australia contain the element Yallock or Yaloak, which means creek or river in the related Kulin languages Woiwurrung, Bunurong and Wathawurrung. These include Woori Yallock Creek, Mordialloc Creek, Woady Yaloak River, and Yallock Creek.
- Multiple rivers and streams in New Zealand have the prefix wai-, the Māori term for river. Notable examples include the Waikato River (river strong flowing river) and Waimakariri River (river cold river).

=== Lakes and other bodies of water ===
- Republic of Karelia, Russia contains several lakes named Ozero ...ozero ('Lake ...-lake' in Russian), or Ozero ...yarvi ('Lake ...-lake' in Russian and Karelian).
- Uvala Bregdetti, Zadar, Arbanasi, Croatia ('Cove Cove' – Croatian, Albanian)
- Ala Wai Canal, Honolulu, Hawaii ('Canal Canal' – Hawaiian)
- Atlin Lake, British Columbia ('Lake Big Lake' – Tlingit)
- Auke Lake, Juneau, Alaska ('Little Lake Lake' – Tlingit)
- Bohai Sea, China ('Bo Sea Sea' -Chinese)
- Cove Bay, Aberdeen, Scotland
- Dal Lake, Kashmir, India ('Lake Lake' – Balti)
- Deschutes Falls, Tumwater, Washington ('Falls Falls, Falls, Washington' – French and Chinuk Wawa)
- Eas Fors, Scotland ('Waterfall Waterfall' in Scottish Gaelic and Norse)
- Gaube Lake, Hautes-Pyrénées ('Lake Lake' – French and Gascon)
- Golfe du Morbihan, Brittany ('Gulf Gulf' – French and Breton morbihan 'little sea'), not to be confused with Golfe du Morbihan (Kerguelen)
- Gulf of Bothnia ('Gulf of gulf' – English and Latinised Swedish)
- Hardangerfjord, Norway (Hard fjord-fjord; anger means fjord in Norse.)
- Hayle Estuary, Cornwall ('Estuary Estuary' – Cornish Heyl 'estuary')
- Issyk-Kul Lake, Kyrgyzstan ('Hot Lake Lake' – Kyrgyz)
- Järvijärvi, Sodankylä, Finland ('Lake Lake' – Finnish)
- Jaurajärvi and Jaurakkajärvi, Finland ('Lake Lake' – Sami javri 'lake', Finnish järvi 'lake')
- Jog Falls, Karnataka, India – A waterfall where "jog" or "joga" means waterfall in the Kannada
- Laacher See, Germany – A caldera lake and potentially active volcano ('Lake of the Lake')
- Lac d'Oô, France – The name Oô is derived from Aragonese ibon 'mountain lake' or from Gascon iu or eu 'mountain lake', so that Lac d'Oô is 'Lake of the Lake'.
- La Cocha lagoon, Colombia – cocha is Quechua for 'lagoon'.
- Lagos Lagoon, Nigeria – lagos is Portuguese for 'lakes', and "lagoon" derives from Latin lacus 'lake, pond'
- Laguna Lake, Philippines – laguna is Spanish for 'lake'. It is also known as Laguna de Bay; it is not a bay but rather refers to the town of Bay, Laguna, and was in fact known as Laguna de Ba'i ('Ba'i Lake') in Spanish times.
- Laguna Lake, California ('Lake Lake' – Spanish)
- Lake Baikal, Russia ('Lake Rich lake' – From the Turkic baj (rich, though this is disputed) and kal (lake).
- Lake Barkol, China (‘Tiger lake lake’) – Likely from Turkic bars (tiger) and köl (lake).
- Lake Cargelligo, Australia ('Lake lake' – From the local Wiradjuri language Cudgellico, meaning 'lake'.
- Lake Chad, Chad ('Lake lake' – Bornu word tsade: "lake")
- Lake Danao (Leyte) and Lake Danao (Negros), Philippines ('Lake Lake' – Cebuano)
- Lake Ellesmere / Te Waihora, New Zealand ('Ella's lake lake' – Old Norse.)
- Lake Hayq, Ethiopia – Amharic hayk means 'lake'.
- Lake Khövsgöl – Khövsgöl, Mongolia – Lake Blue Water Lake, from Tuvan.
- Lake Lagunita, Stanford, California ('Lake Little Lake' – Spanish)
- Lake Lanao, Philippines – ('Lake Lake' – Maranao) derived from ranao.
- Lake Michigan, United States – 'Lake Large Lake' (Michigan is French alteration of the Ojibwe word mishigamaa)
- Lake Natimuk, Australia (Lake Little Lake – Derived from Jardwadjali, an Aboriginal language)
- Lake Nyassa (now called Lake Malawi), Malawi/Mozambique ('Lake Lake' – Yao)
- Lake Ontario, North America ('Lake Beautiful Lake' – Iroquoian)
  - Ontario Lacus, southern Titan ('Beautiful Lake Lake' – Iroquoian)
- Lake Rotorua, New Zealand ('Lake Lake Second' – Māori. Many other New Zealand lakes have the tautological "Lake Roto-" form)
- Lake Tahoe, Nevada/California ('Lake Lake' – Washo)
- Lake Võrtsjärv, Estonia, järv – lake in Estonian.
- Lake Windermere, England ('Winander Mere (Lake)' in Old Norse and Old English
- Loch Watten, Scotland, from Gaelic loch, plus Norse vatn
- Lochaber Lake, Lochaber, Nova Scotia, Canada ('Lake Marsh Lake', Scottish Gaelic – Modern English)
- Lochmere Lake, Cary, North Carolina ('Lake Lake Lake', Scottish Gaelic – Old English – Modern English)
- Loughrigg Tarn, from Gaelic loch, plus Norse-derived "ridge", and tarn meaning a body of water
- Meusebach Creek, Texas, from German Mäusebach – Mouse Creek, therefore 'Mouse Creek Creek'
- Mille Lacs Lake, Minnesota, USA ('Thousand Lakes Lake' – French)
- Nordvik Bay, Sakha Republic, Russia ('North Bay Bay' – Norwegian and English)
- Østensjøvann is a Norwegian lake name that concatenates sjø ('lake that is not as narrow as a fjord') and vann ('lake'). Similarly Møsvann in Telemark, Norway combines mjøsa meaning 'lake' with vann meaning 'lake'.
- Pistyll Rhaeadr, Wales. Both pistyll and rhaeadr have connotations of "waterfall, spout, cascade".
- Rutter Force, Westmorland, England – possibly from neo-Brittonic rejadər + force (Old Norse fors), both words implying "waterfall, cascade".
- Sandefjordsfjorden, Norway, 'Sande fjord's fjord'
- Semerwater, sometimes Lake Semerwater, North Yorkshire, England. Semer is from Old English sæ 'lake' and mere 'lake', thus Lake Semerwater means 'lake lake lake water'
- Stavangerfjorden, Norway, Straight fjord-fjord, stav means straight and anger means fjord in Norse.
- Tal-y-llyn Lake, Wales (End-of the-lake lake – llyn is Welsh for lake)
- Uig Bay ("Uig" means "bay")
- Vatnshlíðarvatn, Iceland (Lake-slope-lake – The farm Vatnshlíð ('Lake-slope') named after the lake, which in turn is named after the farm.)
- Vatnvatnet, Norway ('Lakelake' – Norwegian), a lake in Bodø Municipality
- Wast Water, England – 'water's valley water' from Old Norse vatns dalr (= Wasdale) and Old English wæter
- Lac Léman, Switzerland – 'Léman' from Latin Leman (= Lac)

=== Mountains and hills ===
- Barrhill, barr is an old Celtic word for a flat topped hill.
- Bergeberget, Norway (The Hill Hill – Norwegian)
- Bukit Timah Hill, The highest point in Singapore (Tin Hill Hill)
- Brda Hills, Slovenia – "brda" means small hills in Slovene (thus, the area is sometimes referred to as "Goriška Brda" or "Gorizia Hills" to distinguish it from others)
- Bredon Hill, England (Hill Hill Hill – Brythonic (bre)/Old English (don)/Modern English); compare Bredon and Breedon on the Hill (Hill Hill on the Hill – Brythonic/Saxon/Modern English)
- Brill, England (Hill Hill – Brythonic/Saxon) – also once known in documents as Brill-super-montem (Hill Hill on the Hill – Brythonic/Saxon/Latin). There is also a street in Brill named Brae Hill.
- Brincliffe Edge, Sheffield, UK (Burning Hill Hill Welsh/English)
- Bryn Glas Hill, Wales (Blue Hill Hill – Welsh/English)
- Brynhill, Wales (Hill Hill – Welsh/English)
- Dhaulagiri Himal, Nepal – (Dhaula – dazzling, white, beautiul in Sanskrit hence Hindi, Nepali etc. giri – high mountain in same & Himal – high, snowy peak in Hindi and Nepali)
- Djebel Amour, Algeria: (Arabic & Tamazight)
- Erebor Mons, Titan (Sindarin & Latin, "Lonely Mountain Mountain")
- Filefjell, Norway (The mountain mountain – Norwegian)
- Fjällfjällen, Sweden (The mountain mountains – Swedish)
- Garmendia: Garr- Mendi(a) (fossil & modern Basque)
- The Rock of Gibraltar, (The Rock of The Rock of Tariq – "Gibraltar" From Arabic Jebel-Tariq, which means "The Rock of Tariq")
- Hameldon Hill ("don" likely means "hill")
- Hill Mountain, Pembrokeshire, Wales
- Haukafellsfjall, Iceland – (Haukur's Mountain's Mountain)
- Hoffellsfjall, Iceland – (Monastery Mountain Mountain)
- Hueco Tanks, an area of low mountains in El Paso County, Texas.
- Huntshaw Wood ("Huntshaw" means "Hun's wood" or "honey wood")
- Kálfafellsfjöll, Iceland – (Calf Mountain Mountains)
- Knockhill, a common placename in the Scottish Lowlands, deriving from Scottish Gaelic, cnoc meaning a "hill".
- Kukkulamäki, in 24 distinct locations (Rautjärvi, Jyväskylä, Salo, ...) in Finland, is kukkula "hill" and mäki "hill".
- Montana Mountain, Yukon: Montaña Spanish 'mountain mountain'
- Montcuq, Lot, France: Mont Kukk 'mount mount'
- Monteagle Mountain, a commonly used colloquial name for an area of the Cumberland Plateau near the town of Monteagle, Tennessee. (Eagle Mountain Mountain)
- Monte Sano Mountain in Huntsville, Alabama
- Mount Midoriyama, the final stage of American Ninja Warrior (Mount Green Mountain – Japanese)
- Morro Rock, a volcanic plug rising out of the ocean on the Central Coast of California, from Spanish "Morro" meaning "rock" (Rock Rock).
- Mount Afadja, Ghana's highest peak, is often referred to as 'Mount Afadjato', which means 'Mount Afadja Mountain', 'To' being the Ewe word for 'Mountain'. Ewe is the main language spoken in the area surrounding the peak.
- Mount Katahdin, Maine (Mount The Greatest Mountain – English/Penobscot)
- Mount Kenya, Kenya (Mount White Mountain – "Kenya" is from Kamba "Ki nyaa" in Kikuyu "Kirinyaga", meaning 'white mountain')
- Mount Kilimanjaro, Tanzania (Mount Mount Njaro – Swahili)
- Mount Konocti, California, or K'no-K'tai (Mount Mountain of Many Women – Southeastern Pomo)
- Kyhv Peak, Utah (Mountain Peak – Ute)
- Mount Maunganui, New Zealand (Mount Mount Big – Māori)
- Mount Ōyama, Japan (Mount Big Mountain – Japanese)
- Mount Pisgah (several places in the United States, Australia, Canada, and Antarctica, all ultimately named after a biblical mountain), from Hebrew pisgah (פִּסְגָּה), "summit".
- Mount Yamantau, Russia (Mount Evil Mountain – Bashkir) The tautology exists in Russian as well as English (гора Ямантау from гора Яман тау).
- Muncibbeḍḍu (it: Mongibello) Sicilian name of the volcano Etna, in Sicily, Italy ("Mountain Mountain", from Latin mons and Arabic jabal (جبل)).
- Pedro Colina Hill, Philippines – (Peter Hill Hill – Spanish/English/Spanish; "Colina" is Spanish for hill)
- Pendle Hill, Lancashire, England. (Hill Hill Hill) – "Pen" -(Cumbric language) "Pendle" by epenthesis and elision from "Pen Hyll", the latter word being Old English for "hill".
- Pendleton, near Pendle Hill, Lancashire, England. (Hill Hill Town) or, possibly (Hill Hill Hill), taking the -ton as deriving from Old English dun as opposed to Old English tun.
- Pendleton Hill, North Stonington, Connecticut. (Hill Hill Town Hill) or, possibly, (Hill Hill Hill Hill).
- Penhill, North Yorkshire, England: Pen (Brittonic) and hyll (Old English), both meaning "hill"
- Pen Hill, Somerset England: Pen (Brittonic) and hyll (Old English), both meaning "hill"
- Pen Hill, Dorset, England: Pen (Brittonic) and hyll (Old English), both meaning "hill"
- Pennard Hill, England ("Pennard means "High Hill", see East Pennard and West Pennard)
- Pic de la Munia in Piau-Engaly, France: Pic Muño (Romance & Euskara)
- Picacho Peak (Arizona, U.S.) (Peak Peak – Spanish)
- Pinnelhill, Fife, Scotland. Pen (Pictish) and hyll (Old English; x2), both meaning "hill".
- Pinnacle Peak (Maricopa County, Arizona, U.S.) and Mount Pinnacle (southwestern Virginia, U.S.). Both English. Other locations have the same names.
- Portsdown Hill (Portsmouth, Hampshire, UK) Port's Hill (dún; Anglosaxon) Hill.
- Setersetersetra, Norway – Seter is a mountainside meadow used for grazing in the summer or a cabin located there (definite singular setra).
- Slieve Mish Mountains, Ireland (Mis's Mountain mountains)
- Slieve Bloom Mountains, Ireland – (Bladh's Mountain Mountains)
- Svínafellsfjall, Iceland – (Pig Mountain Mountain)
- Summit Peak, New Zealand (Peak Peak – both English) – also the U.S. has five hills called Summit Peak.
- Table Mesa (Arizona, Colorado, Kansas, New Mexico, USA) (Table Table – Spanish)
- Toiyabe Range (Nevada, U.S.) Shoshoni toyapi "mountain"
- Torpenhow, Cumbria, England, supposedly meaning "hill hill hill", exaggerated into an (unsubstantiated) "Torpenhow Hill = hill-hill-hill hill" for effect; it may only be a single tautology, torpen expressing "the top or breast of a hill" (rather than "hill-hill"), with the tautological addition of Old English hōh "hill".
- Tuc de la Pale, Ariège, France: Tuk Pal 'mount mount'
- Dãy núi Trường Sơn, Vietnam. Núi Trường Sơn: Long Mountain Mountain.
- Vignemale, Pyrenees: Went Mal 'mount mount'
- Yunling Mountains, China (Cloudy mountains mountains – Chinese)

=== Islands ===
- Bardsey Island, Wales ("Bardsey" means "Bardr's island")
- Bernera Island*, Scotland ("Bernera" means "Bjørn's island")
- Brownsea Island, England ("Brownsea" probably means "Brunoc's island")
- Caldey Island, Wales ("Caldey" means "Cold island")
- Canvey Island, England (Cana's island island – Anglo-Saxon)
- Cara Island*, Scotland ("Cara" may mean "Kari's island" or "dearest")
- Dodecanese Islands, Aegean Sea (Twelve Islands Islands – Greek; properly called the Dodecanese)
- Island of Danna*, Scotland ("Danna" means "Dane's island")
- Faroe Islands, sometimes Faeroe Islands (Sheep Islands Islands – Faroese -oe means 'islands' (Faroese: oyar, Danish: øerne); the first part of the name (Før-, Fær- or Fär-) is thought to mean 'sheep'; see History of the Faroe Islands).
- Furzey Island, England ("Furzey" means "Furze island")
- Gateholm Island*, Wales ("Gateholm" means "Goat island")
- Gezira Island, Cairo, Egypt. Gezira جزيرة means 'island' in Egyptian Arabic, so the name is "Island Island."
- Isle of Gigha*, Scotland ("Gigha" probably means "God's island" or "good island")
- Gili Islands, North-west of Lombok, Indonesia (Small Island Islands – Sasak)
- Great Cumbrae Island*, Scotland ("Great Cumbrae" means "Large island of the Cymric people")
- Grand Manan Island*, NB, Canada (Grand Island Island – Maliseet-Passamaquoddy-Penobscot Indian)
- Handa Island*, Scotland ("Handa" means "Island at the sandy river")
- Huapi Island, Chile ("Huapi" means island in Mapuche)
- Insh Island*, Scotland ("Insh" means "Island")
- The Insular Islands, a prehistoric landform of western Canada
- Isla Pulo, Metro Manila, Philippines (Island Island – Filipino)
- Kodiak Island, Alaska (Alutiiq qikertaq, meaning "island")
- Little Cumbrae Island*, Scotland ("Little Cumbrae" means "Little island of the Cymric people")
- Longa Island ("Longa" means "long ship Island")
- Lundy Island*, England (puffin island island – Norse)
- Isle of May, Scotland ("May" possibly means "island of seagulls")
- Mersea Island ("Mersea" means "island of the pool")
- Motu Island, New Zealand ("Motu" is Māori for "island")
- Motutapu Island, New Zealand (Island Sacred Island)
- Moutohora Island, New Zealand ("Moutohora" from mou tohorā, "whale island")
- Öholmen, Pargas, Finland (island the island – Old Norse)
- Osea Island ("Osea" means "Osyth's Island")
- Portsea Island, England ("Portsea" means "harbour island")
- Isle of Raasay*, Scotland ("Raasay" means "Roe deer island" or possibly "horse island")
- Ramsey Island, Wales ("Ramsey" means "Hrafn's island")
- Isle of Sheppey, England (Island of sheep island – Saxon)
- Shuna Island*, Scotland ("Shuna" probably means "Sea island")
- Soa Island ("Soa" means "sheep island")
- Soyea Island*, Scotland ("Soyea" means "Sheep island")
- Skokholm Island*, Wales ("Skokholm" means "Wooded island")
- Skomer Island*, Wales ("Skomer" means "Cleft island")
- Isle of Skye*, see Etymology of Skye
- Island of Stroma* ("Stroma" means "Island in the stream")
- Tenasillahe Island, Oregon. Tenasillahe means 'island' in Chinook Jargon.
- Wallasea Island, England ("Wallasea" is said to mean "foreigner island")
- Walney Island, England (British island island – Old Norse)
- Insel Werd, Switzerland (in German, "Werd" or "Werder" means "island, usually in a river")

=== Human structures and settlements ===
- Calatañazor Castle, Spain (Eagles Castle Castle – from Arabic Qal'at an-Nusur, 'Castle of the Eagles')
- Calatayud Castle, Spain (Jewish Castle Castle – from Arabic Qal'at Yahud, 'Jewish Castle')
- Calatrava la Vieja Castle and Calatrava la Nueva Castle, Spain (The Old Rabah's Castle Castle and The New Rabah's Castle Castle – from Arabic Qal'at Rabah, Rabah being the first Muslim owner of the first ("old") castle in the 8th century)
- Carmarthen, Wales (Welsh: Caerfyrddin) – (Fort fort by the sea – "Caer"/"Car" = Welsh for fort (from Latin castra), "marthen"/"m(f)yrddin" is a Welsh name derived from Latin Moridunum, which itself derived from Brythonic "môr" (sea) and "din"/"dun" (fort))
- Cartagena, Spain – originally Carthago Nova (New New City), from Latin "New Carthage"; Carthago itself is from Phoenician Qart-ḥadašt, 'New City'. Cartagena contains a district named Urbanización Nueva Cartagena, literally city new new new city.
- Châteaudun, France (Castle Stronghold – French and Gaulish)
- Cheetwood, Greater Manchester, England – containing cę:to (Brittonic) + wudu (Old English), both with connotations of "wood, forest".
- Chetwode, Buckinghamshire, England – see above.
- Clapton-on-the-Hill, Gloucestershire, England, "Clapton" means 'hill farm/settlement'
- Port of Copenhagen, Denmark – the Danish name Københavns Havn literally means "Merchants' Harbor Harbor".
- El Pont de Suert, Catalonia, Spain – literally 'the bridge of bridge'; "Pont" is the Catalan word for 'bridge' derived from Latin pons, pontis 'bridge' and "Suert" comes from the Basque Zubiarte, meaning 'between bridges'.
- El Puente de Alcántara, Toledo, Spain (The Bridge of the Bridge – Puente from Spanish, Alcántara from Arabic القنطرة al-qanṭarah 'the bridge')
- Fshati Sellcë near Tetovo, North Macedonia, from Albanian fshati and Macedonian село selo, both meaning "village".
- Gaza Museum of Archaeology, known as "the al-Mat'haf Museum." In Arabic, المتحف al-Matḥaf means 'the Museum'; thus, it is being called "the the Museum Museum."
- Ixtapan de la Sal in Mexico, "Ixtapan" is a Nahuatl term, "de la Sal" is Spanish, so it's being called "salty by the salt".
- City of Kotamobagu (Kota Kotamobagu), North Sulawesi, Indonesia (New City City – Indonesian, long official name)
- City of Kota Kinabalu (Bandaraya Kota Kinabalu), Sabah, Malaysia (Kinabalu City City – Malay, long official name)
- Laugardalslaug (a swimming pool in Reykjavík, literally 'the pool of the valley of the pool'; the valley was originally named after pools used for washing clothes, but a swimming pool was subsequently built there)
- Linguaglossa, Italy (Sicily) (from Italian "lingua", "tongue" and Greek "γλώσσα", "tongue")
- Londesborough, Yorkshire, England – possibly from a Proto-Brythonic Lugudunom ("shining fort") + later Old English burh ("fort, stronghold"), thus "shining fort fort".
- Moorestown Township, New Jersey
- Napton on the Hill, Warwickshire – Napton means "settlement on the hill"
- Newtownballynoe, County Cork, Ireland – ballynoe from the Irish An Baile Nua meaning "New Town".
- Outerbridge Crossing between Perth Amboy, New Jersey and Staten Island, though in this case "Outerbridge" refers to Eugenius Harvey Outerbridge, and not, as is commonly assumed, to the bridge's location.
- Pawtucket Falls (Massachusetts) and Pawtucket Falls (Rhode Island) – Pawtucket is an Algonkian word meaning "at the falls in the river (tidal stream)".
- Staðarstaður, Iceland (Staður means "a pastor's farm" and is a common suffix to the names of such farms – this means "Pastor's farm which is a pastor's farm")
- Thun Castle, "Fortress Castle"
- Trendle Ring earthwork in Somerset, England (Circle Circle)
- Stonepit Quarry old quarry now part of the Old Sulehay nature reserve in Peterborough, England
- Visegrádi fellegvár in Hungary – "fellegvár" means "Citadel" in Hungarian, while "Vyšehrad" is also "Citadel" in Slavic languages.
- Weil der Stadt in Baden-Württemberg, Germany – "Weil" means a human settlement, "Stadt" means the same. French "ville" is German "stadt".
- Yeshiva University, New York City, New York (yeshiva is a Hebrew word meaning university/place of learning, as well as 'the act of sitting')
- Älvsborg Fortress, Gothenburg, Sweden. ("Älv" means "river" and "borg" means "fortress" in Swedish. In Swedish, it is called "Älvsborgs fästning", with "fästning" meaning fortress.)
- Maen Roch, Brittany, France. Named for the granite quarries in the area, it means "Rock Rock" in both Breton and Gallo.

=== Streets and roads ===
- Amsterdamsestraatweg ("Amsterdam street road") is the name of a street in several Dutch towns, including Utrecht, Baarn, Abcoude and Muiden.
- Avenida Boulevard is a street that crosses the city line between Gurabo, Puerto Rico and Juncos, Puerto Rico (avenida = "avenue" in Spanish)
- La Avenida Street, Mountain View, California (The Avenue Street – Spanish)
- Avenue du Boulevard is a street in Portneuf, Quebec
- Avenue Road is a major street in Toronto, Ontario. It is also the name of streets in Bromley, United Kingdom; Cambridge and Ottawa, Ontario; Lavadia, New South Wales; Mosman, New South Wales; Morrinsville, New Zealand; Perrysburg, Ohio; and Smithfield, North Carolina.
- Avenue Road, Bangalore in Bengaluru/Bangalore, India
- Boulevard Avenue is the name of streets in Atlantic City, New Jersey; Bismarck, North Dakota; Central Islip, New York; Craigmont, Idaho; Dickson City, Pennsylvania; Ellicott, New York; Greenlawn, New York; Lincoln, Rhode Island; Little Rock, Arkansas; Montgomery, Minnesota; Pennsauken Township, New Jersey; Pitman, New Jersey; Scranton, Pennsylvania; and West Islip, New York.
- Boulevard Drive is the name of streets in Amory, Mississippi; Atlanta, Georgia; Belpre, Ohio; Danbury, Connecticut; Fort Hunt, Virginia; Homosassa, Florida; La Mesa, California; Pittsburgh, Pennsylvania; St. Ignace, Michigan; Thomson, Georgia; and Wayne, New Jersey
- Boulevard Road is the name of streets in several towns in the United States: Arlington, Massachusetts; Cedar Knolls, Hanover Township, New Jersey; Dedham, Massachusetts; Iron River, Wisconsin; Keokuk, Iowa; Olympia, Washington; and Sumter, South Carolina.
- Boulevard Street is the name of streets in Akron, Ohio; Bacliff, Texas; Kokomo, Indiana; Mexico, Missouri; Salina, New York; Sandwich, Illinois; Edmond, Oklahoma; and Shreveport, Louisiana.
- Calle Boulevard is a street in Bayamón, Puerto Rico (calle = "street" in Spanish)
- Calle Road is a street in Torrance, California
- Calle Street is the name of streets in Leander, Texas; Taft, Texas; Tampa, Florida; Victoria, Texas and Warwick, Rhode Island
- El Camino Way in Palo Alto, California (The way way – Spanish)
- Fore Street is a common street name in the South West of England, where "Fore" derives from the Cornish for 'street'.
- Lane Avenue is a street in Columbus, Ohio
- Lane Boulevard is a street in Kalamazoo, Michigan
- Lane Road is a street in Upper Arlington, Ohio
- Lane Street is a street in Adelaide, Australia; Bucyrus, Ohio; Church Hill, Tennessee; Kalgoorlie, Australia; Kannapolis, North Carolina; Mebane, North Carolina; Portland, Oregon; Seattle, Washington; Topeka, Illinois; and Topeka, Kansas.
- Road Street is a street in Elizabeth City, North Carolina and Hancock, Michigan.
- Street Lane is the main road through the eponymous hamlet of Street Lane in Derbyshire, United Kingdom. It is also a street in Coldspring, Texas, Midway, Utah, and Leeds, United Kingdom.
- Street Road refers to two different highways in Pennsylvania (Pennsylvania Route 132 in Bucks County and Pennsylvania Route 926 in Chester County) – Two nearly synonymous English words. There is also a Street Road in Glastonbury, Somerset, England which leads towards the nearby town called Street. There is also a High Street Rd in Glen Waverley, a suburb of Melbourne, Australia, which is a continuation of a street called High St.
- Voundervour Lane, Penzance, Cornwall, UK; (vounder or bounder is a Cornish word meaning lane)

=== Other ===
- Aran Valley, Catalonia, Spain – Aran comes from the proto-Basque word haran meaning "valley"; in the local Gascon dialect, aran also means "valley"
- Ards Peninsula, Northern Ireland – from Irish aird meaning "promontory" or "peninsula"
- Ardtornish Point, Scotland (High/Heights or Point Point) – Aird from Gaelic, nish from the Norse Ness and point from English – all referring to some form of cape, point or headland).
- Barna Gap, Ireland – (Gap Gap – barna is the Irish word for a mountain gap)
- Baie Verte-Green Bay, electoral district in Newfoundland and Labrador (Baie Verte is French for Green Bay)
- Beechhurst Holt Wood, England (beech wood wood wood – Anglo-Saxon)
- Boulder Rock, Ross Dependency, Antarctica
- Caernarfon Castle, Wales (Castle Arfon Castle – Welsh) (this is inaccurate as castle is 'castell' and caer is 'fort,' it's actually Arfon fort castle)
- Canyon de Chelly, Arizona, United States (from Navajo Tséyiʼ, which means "canyon" )
- Cheile Cheii, Vâlcea, Romania (Gorges' Gorges – Romanian)
- Col de Port, Ariège, France (Pass Pass – French and Occitan)
- Côtes-d'Armor, Brittany, France (Coast of Coast – French and Breton)
- Cuesta Grade, California (grade grade – Spanish and English)
- Daladalur, Iceland – (Valley of Valleys, named after the farm Dalir (Valleys))
- Dalsdalen, Luster Municipality, Norway (Valley's-Valley) – Norwegian
- Dasht-e Kavir, Iran (desert desert)
- East Timor, (East East): From the Indonesian and Malay word "timur", meaning "east"; "Timor-Leste" has the same meaning, leste meaning "east" in Portuguese. (This is strictly not a tautology, as the country East Timor indeed takes up the eastern half of the island Timor; the island was named thus by peoples living west of it. The western half is part of Indonesia and informally named West Timor. In the national language, Tetum, the name is Timor Lorosa'e, which means rising sun, or east.
  See also South Australia and South Vietnam below.)
- Galillee, a region in northern Israel: The name "Galil" (גליל) means "geographical region" in Hebrew.
- Gilsárgil, Iceland – (Canyon River Canyon: The canyon of the river which in turn flows through that same canyon.) The river was named first, and then the canyon was named after the river much later.
- Glendale – Anglicisation of the Gaelic Gleann Dail. Gleann simply means "valley", and dail is a borrowing from the Norse for "valley", which in Gaelic specifically means a valley containing fertile arable land, or any low-lying farmland. The anglicised form appears more tautological as the word dale in English is used to describe any valley.
- Glen Canyon (multiple examples)
- Glen of Aherlow – a glen is a long, deep valley, while Aherlow is from the Irish eatharlach, meaning "lowland between two mountains", i.e. a valley.
- Gobi Desert, Mongolia (Desert Desert – "Govi" is Mongolian)
- Hardtwald in Baden-Württemberg, Germany – "hardt" is an exploited forest, and "wald" means "forest".
- Hill Holt Wood, England (hill wood wood) – holt means "wood".
- Howth Head, Ireland – Old Norse Hǫfuð (meaning "head") + English head
- Hvilftarhvilft, Iceland – (Cirque Cirque) The farm "Hvilft", in Önundarfjörður, which means cirque, was named after the cirque in the mountain above it, and the cirque itself was then named after the farm.
- Inverarish (both Gaelic and Norse, doubly the mouth of a stream)
- Jiayuguan Pass – (Jiayu Pass Pass – Mandarin Chinese)
- Kaieteur Falls in Kaieteur National Park, Potaro-Siparuni Region, Guyana – (Kai falls Falls – Patamona)
- Kalahari Desert, southern Africa, from one of two Tswana words essentially meaning desert.
- Khor Khwair, a neighborhood in Ras al-Khaima, U.A.E. (Creek Creek – Arabic)
- Kvinnherad kommune, Norway, (Kvinn municipality municipality – Nynorsk and Bokmål variations of Norwegian)
- La Brea Tar Pits, California, United States (The Tar Tar Pits – Spanish)
- Los Altos Hills, California (The foothills hills – Spanish)
- Metsalaane, village in Estonia (both metsa and laane mean "forest" in Estonian)
- Milky Way Galaxy* (Milky Way Milky – Greek; for this reason some scientists, such as the late Isaac Asimov, have argued that the Milky Way should be renamed the "Home Galaxy" or some such.)
- Minnehaha Falls, Minnesota, United States. Waterfall Falls – Dakota)
- Mull of Kintyre (Round Headland of Headland – Scottish Gaelic)
- Namib Desert (Desert Desert – Khoekhoegowab)
- Nathu La Pass, Sino-Indian border, (Listening Ears Pass Pass – Tibetan)
- Nesoddtangen, Norway, a triple tautology, consisting of three parts, nes, odd and tangen, all being synonyms signifying a small cape or promontory.
- Nusa Tenggara Timur, Indonesia – (Eastern Southeastern Islands – Indonesian)
- Nyanza Lac, Burundi – Nyanza and lac are the Bantu and French words for "lake" respectively. This is a city, not a lake, though on the shore of Lake Tanganyika.
- The Passaic Valley, New Jersey, United States (The valley valley – Lenape)
- Playalinda Beach, Florida, United States (Pretty beach beach – Spanish)
- Registan Desert, Central Asia (Desert desert – Persian)
- Sahara Desert*, Africa (Deserts desert – Arabic)
- Sharm Old Harbour (a common English name for the old harbour at Sharm el Sheikh) (harbour old harbour – Arabic)
- Skarðsskarð, Iceland (Pass's Pass: A mountain pass named after a farm which in turn is named after the pass to begin with.)
- South Australia (Australia being Latin for "southern land". Strictly, this is not a tautology for the same reason as for East Timor.)
- South Vietnam (Nam being Vietnamese for "south", although the official name was the Republic of Vietnam. Strictly, this is not a tautology for the same reason as for East Timor.)
- Swahili Coast, "Swahili" is an Arabic adjective meaning "coastal [dweller]".
- Tahunanui Beach, New Zealand (the Māori word tahuna can mean beach, shoal, or sandbank. Tahunanui Beach is thus 'Beach Big Beach').
- Tappiyan Falls, Batad – waterfalls near the Banawe Rice Terraces in the Philippines – means Falls (in Ifugao).
- Tham Luang Nang Non, sometimes referred to as Tham Luang Cave (Tham Luang means 'great cave,' so Tham Luang Cave means 'Great Cave Cave').
- Tipsoo Meadow, Mount Rainier National Park, Washington, United States. Tipsoo means 'meadow' in Chinook Jargon.
- Traigh Beach (Beach beach – Scottish Gaelic)
- Ustyurt Plateau. Ustyurt means ‘plateau’ in Kazakh, Turkmen, Uzbek, and Karakalpak.
- Waterford Harbour – the name "Waterford" derives from Old Norse Veðrafjǫrðr, "ram fjord", referring the natural harbour.
- Walden Woods, Massachusetts, United States – the name "Walden" derives from German Wald, meaning woods or forest.
- Wookey Hole Caves – the name Wookey is derived from the Celtic (Welsh) for 'cave', "Ogo" or "Ogof" which gave the early names for this cave of "Ochie" "Ochy". Hole is Anglo-Saxon for cave, which is itself of Latin/Norman derivation. Therefore, the name Wookey Hole Cave basically means cave cave cave.

== See also ==
- List of reduplicated place names
- Bilingual tautological expressions
- Pleonasm
- RAS syndrome
