= Nutrient cycling in the Columbia River Basin =

Nutrient cycling in the Columbia River Basin involves the transport of nutrients through the system, as well as transformations from among dissolved, solid, and gaseous phases, depending on the element. The elements that constitute important nutrient cycles include macronutrients such as nitrogen (as ammonium, nitrite, and nitrate), silicate, phosphorus, and micronutrients, which are found in trace amounts, such as iron. Their cycling within a system is controlled by many biological, chemical, and physical processes.

The Columbia River Basin is the largest freshwater system of the Pacific Northwest, and due to its complexity, size, and modification by humans, nutrient cycling within the system is affected by many different components. Both natural and anthropogenic processes are involved in the cycling of nutrients. Natural processes in the system include estuarine mixing of fresh and ocean waters, and climate variability patterns such as the Pacific Decadal Oscillation and the El Nino Southern Oscillation (both climatic cycles that affect the amount of regional snowpack and river discharge). Natural sources of nutrients in the Columbia River include weathering, leaf litter, salmon carcasses, runoff from its tributaries, and ocean estuary exchange. Major anthropogenic impacts to nutrients in the basin are due to fertilizers from agriculture, sewage systems, logging, and the construction of dams.

Nutrients dynamics vary in the river basin from the headwaters to the main river and dams, to finally reaching the Columbia River estuary and ocean. Upstream in the headwaters, salmon runs are the main source of nutrients. Dams along the river impact nutrient cycling by increasing residence time of nutrients, and reducing the transport of silicate to the estuary, which directly impacts diatoms, a type of phytoplankton. The dams are also a barrier to salmon migration, and can increase the amount of methane locally produced. The Columbia River estuary exports high rates of nutrients into the Pacific Ocean; with the exception of nitrogen, which is delivered into the estuary by ocean upwelling sources.

== Description ==
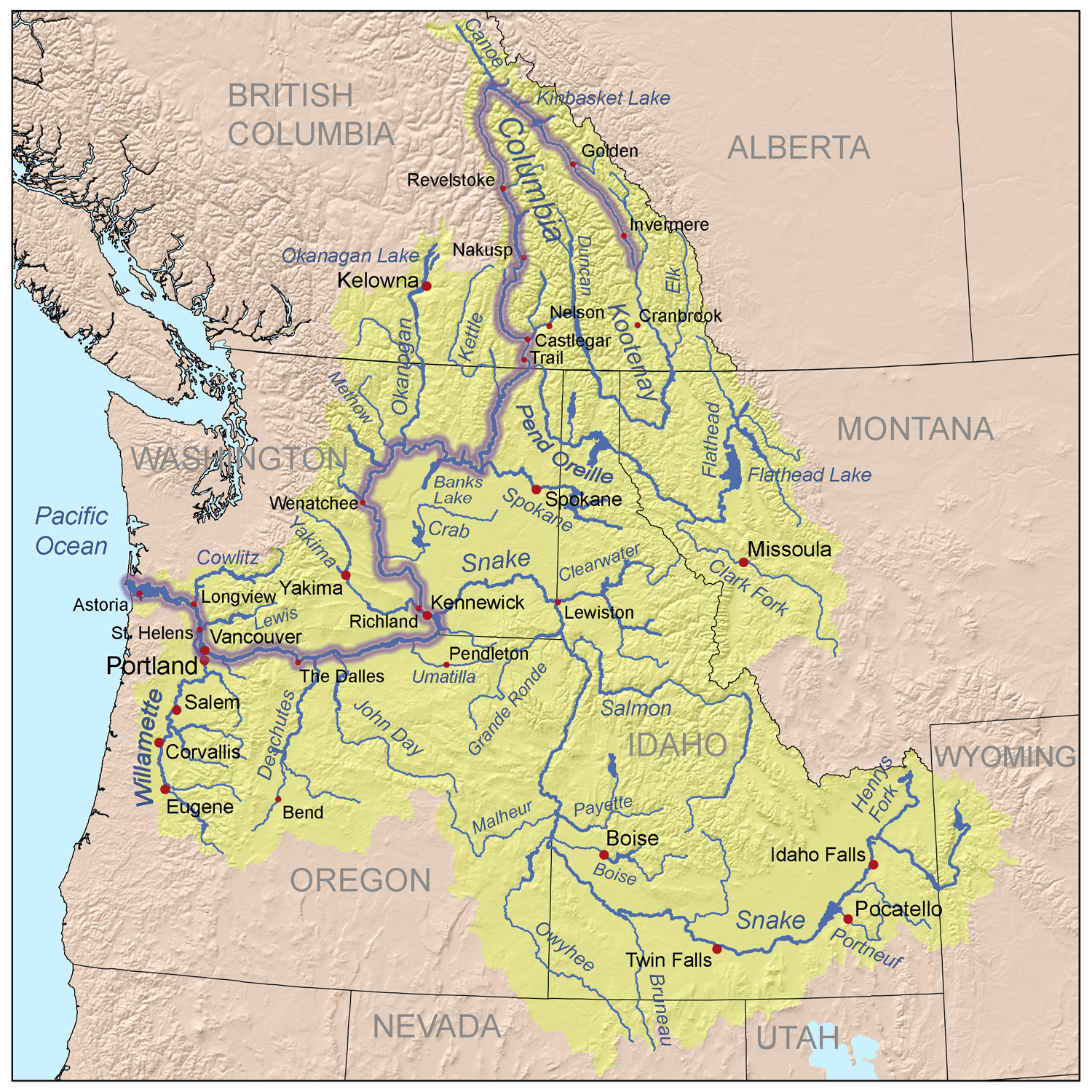
Map of the Columbia Basin

The Columbia River basin is a major watershed and the largest river in the Pacific Northwest region of North America. Extending from southern British Columbia to northern Nevada, the watershed includes seven American states and two Canadian provinces and drains an area of about 260,000 square miles. The Columbia River stretches 1,620 miles in length until its discharge into the Pacific Ocean near Astoria, Oregon. The average annual discharge rate of the Columbia River changes due to climate and land-use variability, but generally ranges from 120,000 to 260,000 cubic feet per second. Finally, the population of the Columbia River Basin within the United States is about 4.6 million people (per the 2000 census).

The water cycle in the Columbia River is dependent on the relation between water flow and topography in the basin. Within the United States, only the Missouri-Mississippi River system has annual runoff greater than that of the Columbia River. The amount of water that the river carries each year is determined by the precipitation, sunlight, and air temperature in the basin, which varies from year to year. West of the Cascade Range, most of the winter precipitation falls as rain, but in the Cascade Mountains and eastward, precipitation through winter is snow. Snowmelt in the mountains begins to reach the river during early to mid-spring. About 30 percent of the streamflow in the Columbia River occurs between January and March (primarily from rainfall) and about 30 percent occurs between April and June (from a combination of rainfall and snowmelt).

== Natural processes ==
Coastal upwelling, river discharge, tidal mixing, estuarine circulation, climate oscillation, and remineralization, are sources or sinks for the Columbia River basin nutrient budget. Due to these transport processes the Columbia River Estuary provides large nutrient sources to the adjacent sub-arctic Northeast Pacific coastal surface water.

Nitrogen is added to rivers through many natural processes, such as the decomposition of leaf litter and organic matter. Nitrogen gas is the most abundant molecule in earth's atmosphere, comprising about 78 percent of the total composition of air, however not typically a large source of nitrogen to the river. This form of nitrogen, dinitrogen gas ($\ce{N2}$), is inert and biologically unavailable to most living organisms. However, some bacteria and archaea can utilize nitrogen fixation to convert dinitrogen into ammonia or other compounds accessible to organisms.

Finally, nitrogen load at the Columbia River mouth is about 2-20 times larger than that at the Canadian border. This gradient in nitrogen distribution is partly a result of the inputs of the Columbia's major tributaries, the Snake River and the Willamette River. The Snake and Willamette rivers together contribute about 50-80 percent of the nitrogen load in a given year, coming from activities within those respective watersheds.

=== Weathering and runoff ===
Weathering is the breakdown of rocks, soil, and minerals through contact with water, the atmosphere, and biological organisms, converting solid phase minerals to dissolved phase compounds. This process can introduce nutrients, most notably phosphorus, into the Columbia watershed. Both chemical and physical weathering occur, usually together, and this coupling tends to accelerate the other. Precipitation varies across the basin, influencing the amount of weathering and subsequent runoff that transports this material into the basin.

Organic matter such as leaves may also naturally fall into the waterways through runoff. Over time, this material is respired, releasing assimilated nutrients into the environment.

=== Salmon impacts on nutrient cycling ===
An important source of nutrients, such as nitrogen and phosphorus, for rivers in the Pacific Northwest is the spawning of salmon and subsequent death and decomposition of fish up-river. Every fall, ocean salmon at the end of their life cycle swim upriver to spawn before they die. The remineralization of their organic matter releases significant nitrogen loads into the river, although recent decades have observed decreased salmon runs and subsequently less impact on the total nitrogen budget.

Salmon are an anadromous family of fish that rear in freshwater, migrate to the ocean as juveniles, and then return to the freshwater as adults to lay their eggs and die in what is called a salmon run. Their death and subsequent decomposition releases substantial amounts of nitrogen and lower amounts of phosphorus into the system, boosting the productivity of local headwaters and serving as a vector of material transport across the ocean to watershed interface. Studies have estimated salmon in some parts of the Columbia river contribute up to 60 percent of nitrogen to other trophic levels.

The regional ubiquity of salmon as a recreational and commercial fishery has led to increased attention on local populations within the Columbia River system. Annual salmon harvests are among the highest-earners of the Pacific Northwest fishery economy; in the lower Columbia River specifically, salmon account for over 84 percent of commercial fish landings.

While areas accessible to salmon have been reduced over the past century through the construction of dams and the modification of river channels, this group of fish historically inhabited almost 13,000 miles of the Columbia River basin. Efforts from fishery management and state agencies, as well as the listing of several resident salmon stocks under the protection of the Endangered Species Act, has led to the re-establishment of accessibility to some parts of the Columbia River system for salmon. The regional return of salmon runs restores an important segment of local nutrient cycles, particularly that of nitrogen and phosphorus, to the system.

=== Estuarine and ocean exchange ===
The Columbia River Estuary is the most downstream portion of the river that experiences ocean tides, generally defined as the furthest reach of the Columbia River plume to the Bonneville Dam. Here, a transition zone occurs where freshwater discharge from the river meets and mixes with Pacific Ocean saltwater. In this region, physical processes that affect nutrients are the circulation (entrance/exit, movement) of specific water masses with their nutrient load, the magnitude of tidal flow distributing ocean waters inland, and bottom sediment exchange affecting nutrient particle mobility.

With the exception of nitrogen, the Columbia River estuary nutrient budget tends to be dominated by nutrient transport out of the system. During periods of high river flow, generally April to June, the estuary has a daily average residence time of less than a day. Meanwhile, at times of lowest river discharge, typically September to October, this turnover time lengthens to about three days. The turnover time can also vary due to the tidal cycle, and affect the amount of oceanic exchange in the estuary; on the whole the residence time is fairly short. Through a more rapid transit time of waters within the river, local primary production tends to be lower as autotrophic communities are quickly flushed out of the system. Since there is less subsequent biological uptake of nutrients, there is a high rate of nutrient transport out of the Columbia River and into coastal waters.

The upwelled waters of the Pacific Ocean have very high concentrations of dissolved nutrients due to the history of biological respiration that has occurred throughout the water masses' time in circulation through the deep ocean. Biological respiration is the consumption of organic matter and concurrent release of nutrients contained in that biomass. This process is an important source for nutrients that other organisms require. Examples of these organisms include phytoplankton and algae, whose communities are often limited in growth by the availability of specific nutrients, most commonly nitrogen which is the primary limiting nutrient the Columbia River. In addition, to nitrogen, iron, and silicate cycling in the estuary can impact local and coastal ocean phytoplankton communities.

==== Nitrate ====
Due to coastal upwelling, ocean sources of nitrate (an oxidized form of nitrogen) exceed river sources by a magnitude of roughly 3 to 1, and is a primary source of nitrogen for the Columbia River Estuary. This is evident within the estuary by the positively correlated relationship of nitrate availability and salinity, the latter an identifying characteristic of highly saline marine waters. As a result of differences in delivery to the system, nitrate is the primary limiting nutrient in the estuary. Consequently, during seasonal periods of downwelling when less ocean water is mixed into the estuary, local nitrate concentrations may be very low. Thus, nutrient cycling and primary production in the estuary are heavily linked with the seasonal winds off the Oregon and Washington coasts that control local ocean upwelling and downwelling.

==== Phosphate ====
Although phosphorus is of interest in the mid-river, especially in and around reservoirs throughout the Columbia River Basin as discussed below, it is not typically a limiting nutrient for biological communities within the estuary. As a result, there is little available literature on phosphate cycling within the estuary.

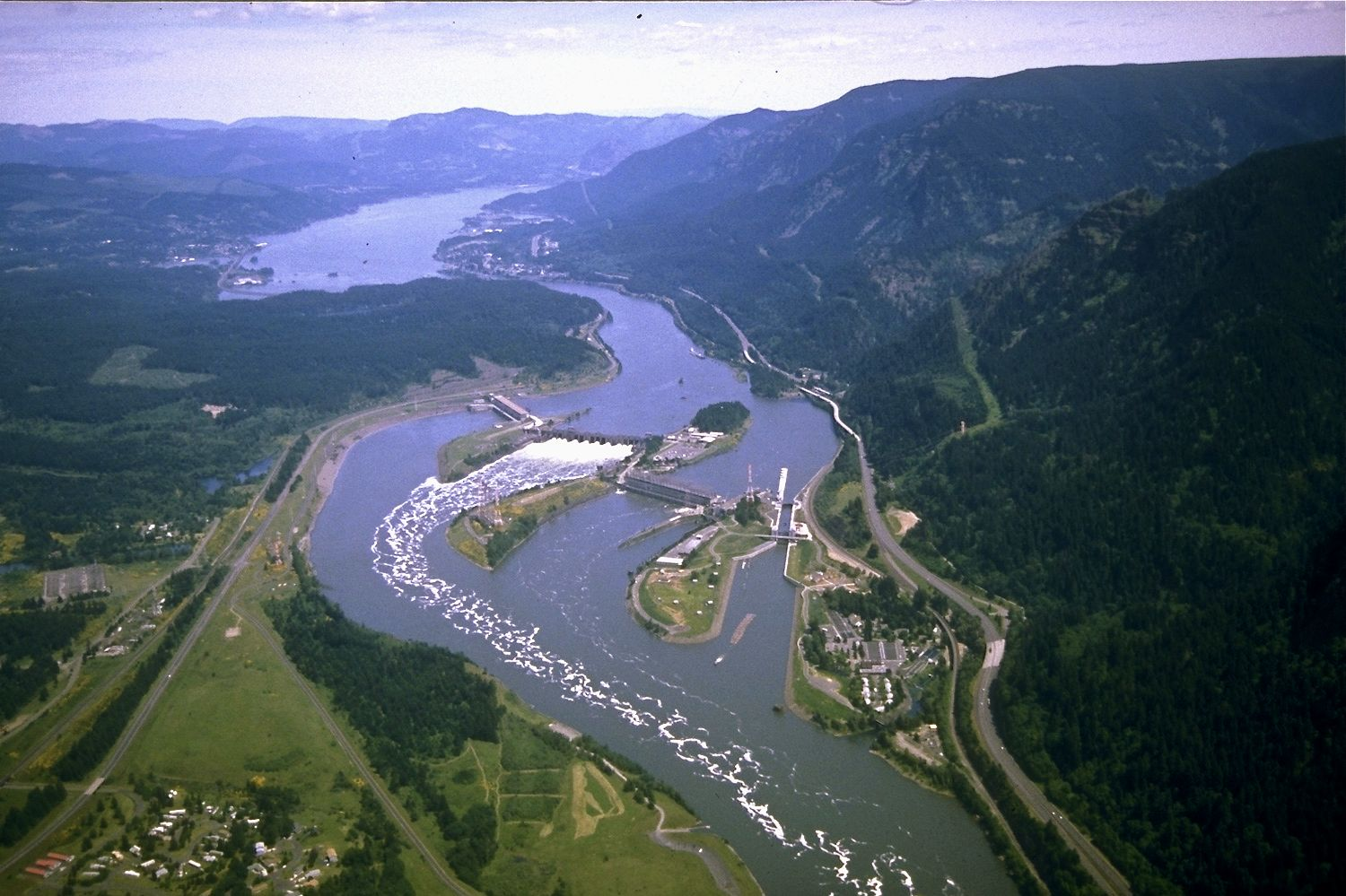
Aerial view of Columbia River and Bonneville Dam

==== Iron ====
The primary source of iron into the estuary is from geologic rock weathering and subsequent runoff delivery to the system. In addition, some iron may come from the Pacific Ocean and is transported into the estuary during tidal oscillation, enhanced seasonally during periods of upwelling. Iron inputs derived from riverine and oceanic origins are typically on the magnitude of 14-30 nM and 6 nM in concentration respectively. These sources of iron are generally sufficient to meet biological demands, including those of primary production, in the estuary and upriver. Consequently, iron is commonly not the limiting nutrient in the system; rather, the river depending on season and flow may serve as a net source of iron to iron-deficient coastal regions of the Northeast Pacific, sometimes referred to as areas of High Nutrient, Low Chlorophyll.

==== Silicate ====
As discussed in more detail below, dams can cause large scale hydrological changes by forming reservoirs. These reservoirs can act as nutrient traps altering nutrient ratios and reducing silicate transport through rivers and into the estuary. Since mid twentieth-century dam construction on the Columbia river, seasonal silicate transport out of the Columbia River Estuary has shifted in magnitude since the historical, pre-alteration of the river hydrology.

Outside the estuary, the Columbia river is a source of silicate for the sub-arctic Northeast Pacific coast. Silicate is a required nutrient for diatoms, which form siliceous shells, within the surface waters of this coastal region. The observed shift in silicate transport out of the Columbia River estuary since 1970 has resulted in the development of seasonal silicate limited regions of diatom production in coastal waters near the estuary.

=== PDO and ENSO ===
Nutrient dynamics are also affected on a long-term scale by human and climate influences. Specifically, the Columbia River discharge rates, which govern bulk nutrient transport, follow Pacific Decadal Oscillation (PDO) and El Niño Southern Oscillation (ENSO). This is because of how these oscillations affect regional air temperature, precipitation patterns, and off shore wind, which in turn affect annual snowpack, sea surface temperatures, and upwelling and downwelling trends. Changes in these trends can alter the magnitude of runoff from land incorporated into the Columbia River system as well as coastal ocean inflow, which ultimately alter nutrient loading by either bringing in additional nutrients or washing them out.

Research indicates dam construction on the river has affected the strength of PDO and ENSO's influence through alteration of runoff residence times, but to date these effects have not been well described. Since 1858, total silicate transport has decreased by 50 percent, with 10 percent of that decrease directly linked to these climate oscillations. This alteration of net nutrient transport is critical to determining nutrient distribution and availability throughout the basin. Silicate, for example, may direct nutrient cycling by altering environmental parameters implicated in primary production by organisms, including river depth, flood frequency, and turbidity.

=== Greening of the estuary ===
It has been observed that the Columbia River estuary is "greening". "Greening" of the estuary describes the movement of phytoplankton blooms that historically occurred outside the mouth of the river, and are now blooming much more frequently inside the estuary, effectively "greening" the river surface with colored microscopic organisms.

Primary production in this region is often dominated by diatom species such as Skeletomema costatum, Chaetoceros spp. and Thalassiosira spp. which bloom seasonally in spring and summer. Large blooms of these species consume the available nitrogen in the region, eventually hindering the furthering blooming by creating a nitrate-limited growth period. Exacerbating this nitrogen depletion, high estuarine turnover times in the Columbia River Estuary displace these diatoms communities out into the ocean. This export reduces rates of nitrogen remineralization as the available nitrogen consumed by the diatom blooms is removed from the estuary system.

The nitrogen-deplete conditions created by these blooms are improved as natural and anthroprogenic macro-nutrients and micro-nutrients are transported into the system by river discharge. The spring-summer seasonality of these diatom blooms is affected by climate, variable with both Pacific Decadal Oscillation (PDO) and El Niño Southern Oscillation (ENSO) indices, and human influences such as dam construction in the watershed. As discussed previously, both climate oscillation and human interaction in the Columbia watershed have been shown decrease transport of nutrients into the estuary.

As an example of human impacts on this system, the increased footprint of water reservoirs caused by damning of the Columbia River has resulted in a standing pools of nitrogen, carbon, and phosphorus. These nutrients mostly stay within the watershed during winter months instead of discharging to the ocean, as river discharge rates are controlled by dam release schedules. As a result, these nutrients and organic matter are locally biochemically processed by plankton communities, increasing the biomass of life within the system, and resulting in high nutrient releases in spring and summer months when dam flow through is increased. As a result, this anthroprogenic discharge cycle contributes to the seasonality of diatom blooms in the estuary.

Unlike other large estuaries, such as the Chesapeake Bay Estuary, the Columbia River supplies little nitrate to the estuary relative to the overall local nitrogen budget. Rather, the primary source of nitrate into the estuary is from ocean exchange caused by wind-driven seasonal upwelling off the Oregon and Washington coasts. This influx of nitrate, generally the primary limiting nutrient to biological communities in the estuary, is an important driver of primary productivity in estuarine plumes of river discharge. Moreover, large scale upwelling on the Oregon-Washington coast typically occurs in spring and summer, and as discussed previously, is coupled with the PDO and ENSO, this seasonal upwelling further contributes to diatom bloom in the estuary. Finally, without this source of nitrogen through upwelling, the estuary quickly becomes nitrate limited and hinders further facilitation of biological activity.

=== Red blooms ===
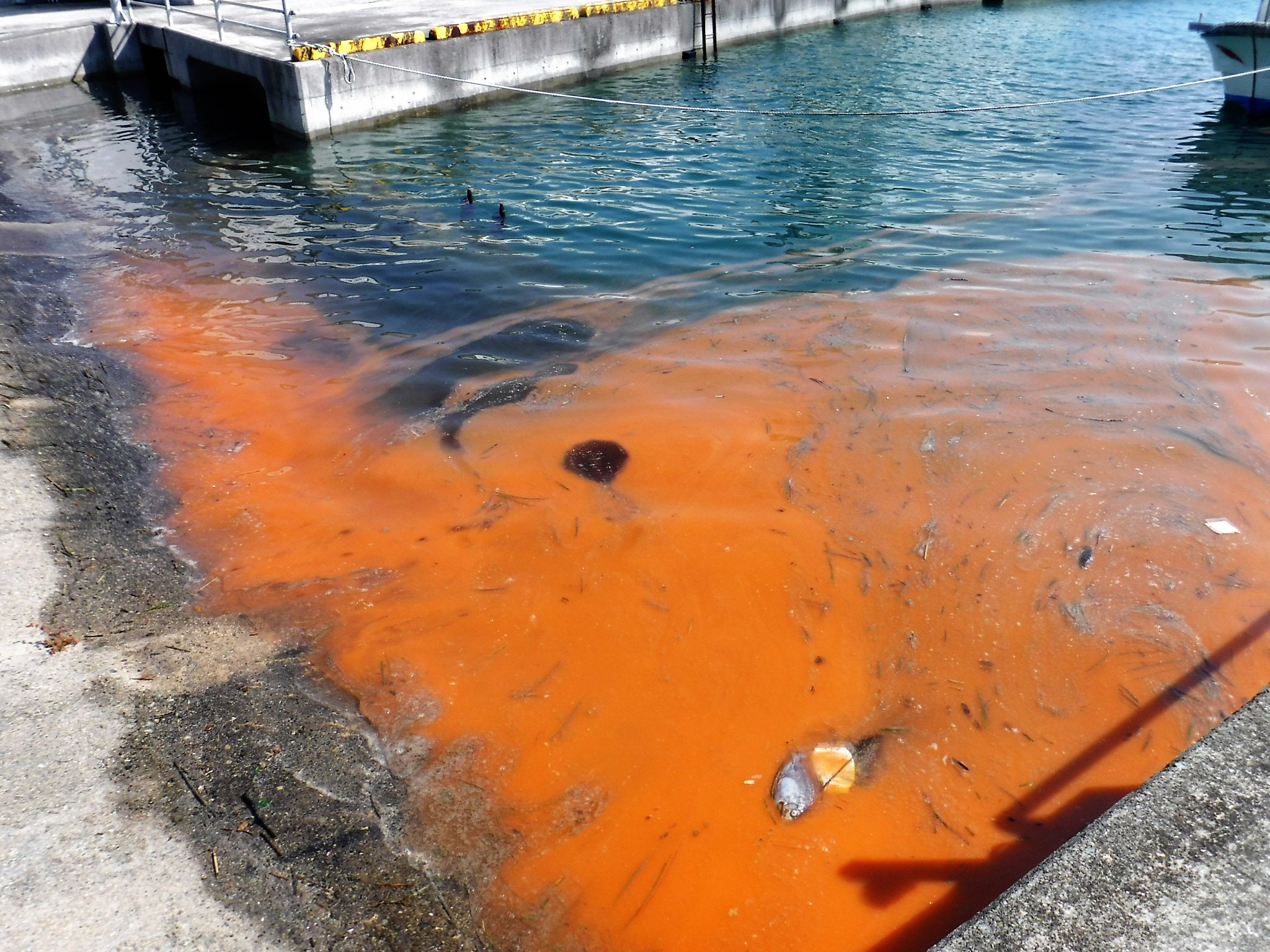
Red bloom in a harbor. The vibrant color of the blooms attracts attention from scientists and local community members.

Red blooms, a type of plankton bloom with a characteristic scarlet pigment, occur every year in the Columbia River estuary, lasting several months during late summer to early fall. The marine ciliate Myrionecta rubra is responsible for this annual discoloration. Research has found that while not toxic, dense blooms of M. rubra can impact estuaries, fjords, and upwelling areas and have been associated with high rates of local primary production.

M. rubra gets its red color from consuming cryptophytes, or algae, that contain a red pigment called phycoerythrin in their chloroplasts. In the Columbia River estuary, M. rubra commonly preys on the cryptophyte Teleaulax amphioxeia. From its prey, M. rubra also acquires specialty cellular organs in order to photosynthesize and effectively absorbs these compounds into its own body. This process is referred to as "acquired phototrophy", and for M. rubra includes the assimilation of chloroplasts, nuclei, and mitochondria During the day, the ciliates stay near the surface of the water to photosynthesize, which is how the red blooms are easily observed.

One question of interest associated with M. rubra is its ability to spread within the Columbia River estuary in spite of the short residence time of the water. The red blooms have been observed initiating near the river mouth, then establishing throughout the entire lower estuary. M. rubra is quite motile and can swim (1.2 cm / second) and jump (as much as 160 μm in 20 milliseconds), which could explain how they are able to stay within the estuary for months at a time.

The blooms have a dramatic impact on the local ecosystem and nutrient levels. Globally, studies have shown that M. rubra blooms are associated with higher levels of bacteria, dissolved organic nutrients, oxygen saturation, particulate organic carbon and nitrogen. Specifically in the Columbia River estuary, red blooms correspond with increased secondary production by microbes and decreased ammonium, nitrate, and dissolved organic carbon levels. A further study in the Columbia River estuary found that high concentrations of organic nutrients and low amounts of inorganic nitrogen were associated with the red waters. M. rubra blooms also created areas characterized by high primary production and increased levels of particulate organic matter during this period, thus shifting the trophic status in red water areas from net heterotrophy towards autotrophy, making M. rubra's red blooms a seasonal biogeochemical hotspot of the Columbia River estuary.

== Anthropogenic impacts on processes ==
Nutrient cycling is affected by human alteration referred to as anthropogenic impacts. The Columbia River Basin is home to nearly five million residents, and the rapid alteration of land in the past several centuries has shifted many aspects of nutrient dynamics within this environment. Human processes such as construction (such as for dams), logging, and mining can impact sediment transport, resulting in decreased accumulation and/or the enhancement or removal of nutrients. The cycling of nutrients within the Columbia River Basin is also affected by differences in land-use through variability in human development and vegetation. Land use of the basin within the United States is primarily forested (87 percent), with 11 percent of land used for agriculture, and 2 percent for urban areas.

=== Agriculture ===
Human-related activity has contributed over 50 percent of the available global reactive nitrogen. The Haber-Bosch process is an artificial means of nitrogen fixation, producing over 450 million tons of ammonia per year. Much of this yield is used for agricultural purposes through fertilizers. Agricultural sources of nitrogen reach rivers primarily through the erosion of soil sediments, but also through airborne dust and gaseous transport of volatilized NH_{3} from livestock manure and fertilizers.

At the beginning of the twentieth century, agriculture began to exceed mining and became the Columbia River Basin's primary economic industry. The Columbia River has been subject to cultural eutrophication in part due to the use of the river and its tributaries to irrigate over seven million acres of farmland, an extraction that comprises an average of 93 percent of daily water use in the basin. Natural run-off caused by precipitation and snowpack melt across agricultural lands further transports more of these nutrients into the river. In the late 1990s, the nitrogen load in the Columbia river was over twice the concentration historically observed.

=== Logging ===
Forests are important terrestrial sinks for nutrients due to the ability of vegetation to sequester excess nutrients into their biomass. Additionally, plant roots stabilize soils and consequently prevent a large portion of the nutrient pool to be transferred via runoff into rivers and other waterways. Studies of nearby Pacific Northwest forests have found that logged forests lose 1.6 to 3 times the amount of nutrients over several years times compared to undisturbed areas. By 1992, 35 percent of the total harvestable forest in the Columbia River Basin had been logged. Consequently, though direct quantification of these processes within the Columbia River watershed have not yet occurred, the ubiquitous changes in land-use by the logging industry have changed the delivery of nutrients into the system.

=== Sewage and septic inputs ===
A significant nutrient source from developed areas into aquatic ecosystems is through sewage and septic systems. Municipal waste, high in nitrogen and phosphorus, is sometimes treated by wastewater facilities or through soil filtration, but often some excess nutrients leak and contribute to eutrophication. Human sewage waste in the United States accounts for about 12 percent of average annual nitrogen input into rivers. Often, there are many small-scale sources of this discharge and no one input is clearly dominating nutrient loading. However, occasionally unexpected events, usually through sewer systems or at wastewater plants, occur that result in a significant singular emission. In the fall of 2017 for example, a power failure at a treatment facility in Vancouver, Washington led to the discharge of over 510,000 gallons of wholly untreated and partially treatment effluent. The continuing background discharge along with larger-scale, periodic emission events comprise a large input of human-derived nutrient loading.

=== Effects of dams ===
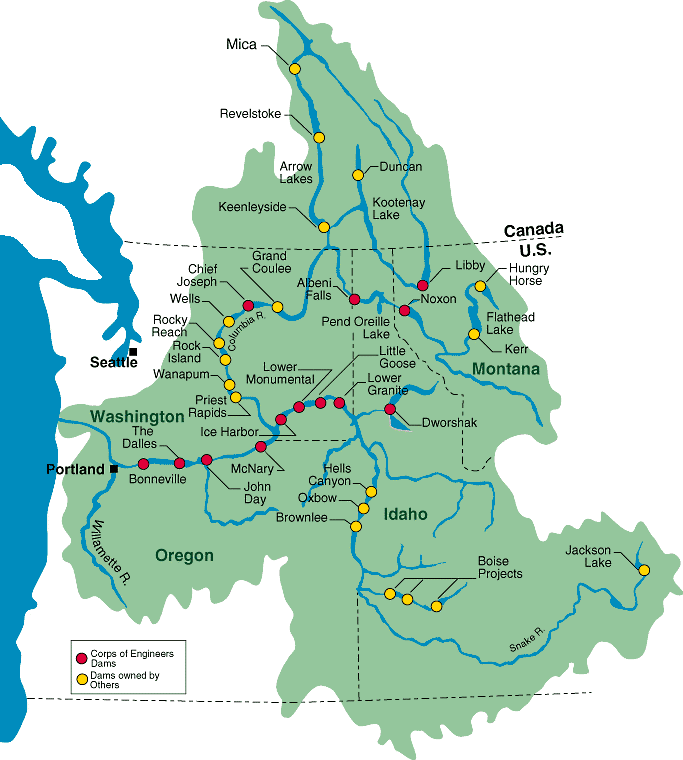
Map of Columbia River Basin showing locations of dams throughout the basin. The large number of dams has had measurable and lasting impact on the nutrient cycling thought the basin - dams shown in red and yellow.

Beginning in the 1930s with the construction of the Bonneville and Grand Coulee dams, the Columbia River has experienced significant modification to its flow. Today, the US Army Corps of Engineers recognize over 250 reservoirs, 150 hydroelectric projects, and 18 mainstem dams on the Columbia and its main tributary, the Snake River. Dams have been shown to directly impact nutrient cycling within the Columbia river basin through the formation of reservoirs which dramatically alter river hydrology and discharge rates and as a result constitute a major anthroprogenic impact on nutrient cycling in the river. Due to its size and the large number of dams within the basin, the Columbia River basin is often used as representative case study on how dams an impact nutrient cycling of watersheds in general. Notably, dam construction in the Columbia River Basin has impacted relative nutrient ratios, methane production, and salmon migration.

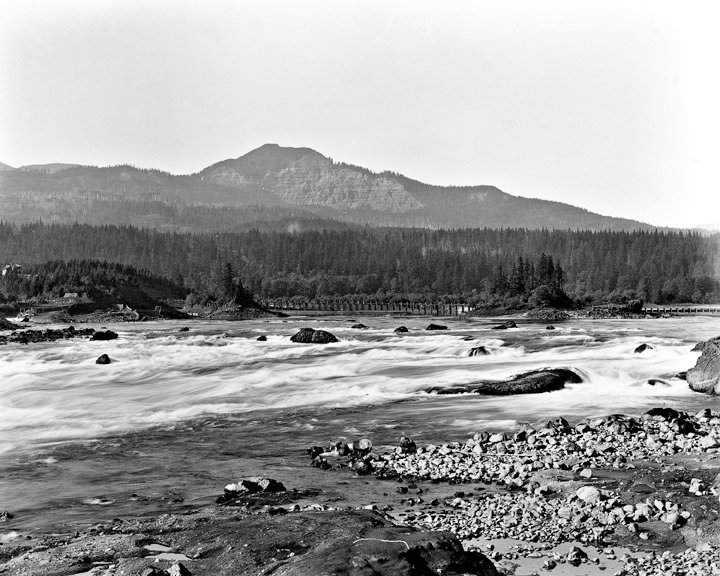
Cascades Rapids prior to construction of the Bonneville Dam.

To provide context for the scale of change that dams can effect, the construction of the Bonneville dam in the late 1930s completely submerged the Cascades Rapids, permanently changing the local river hydrology and subsequently altering local nutrient transport and processes in the region. The restriction of flow as well as the creation of standing water upriver of the dams have been linked to deleterious effects on nutrient cycling in similar ecosystems, such as the Murray River Basin in Australia and the Danube River Basin in Europe, through processes such as the alteration of particle residence times and nutrient loading.

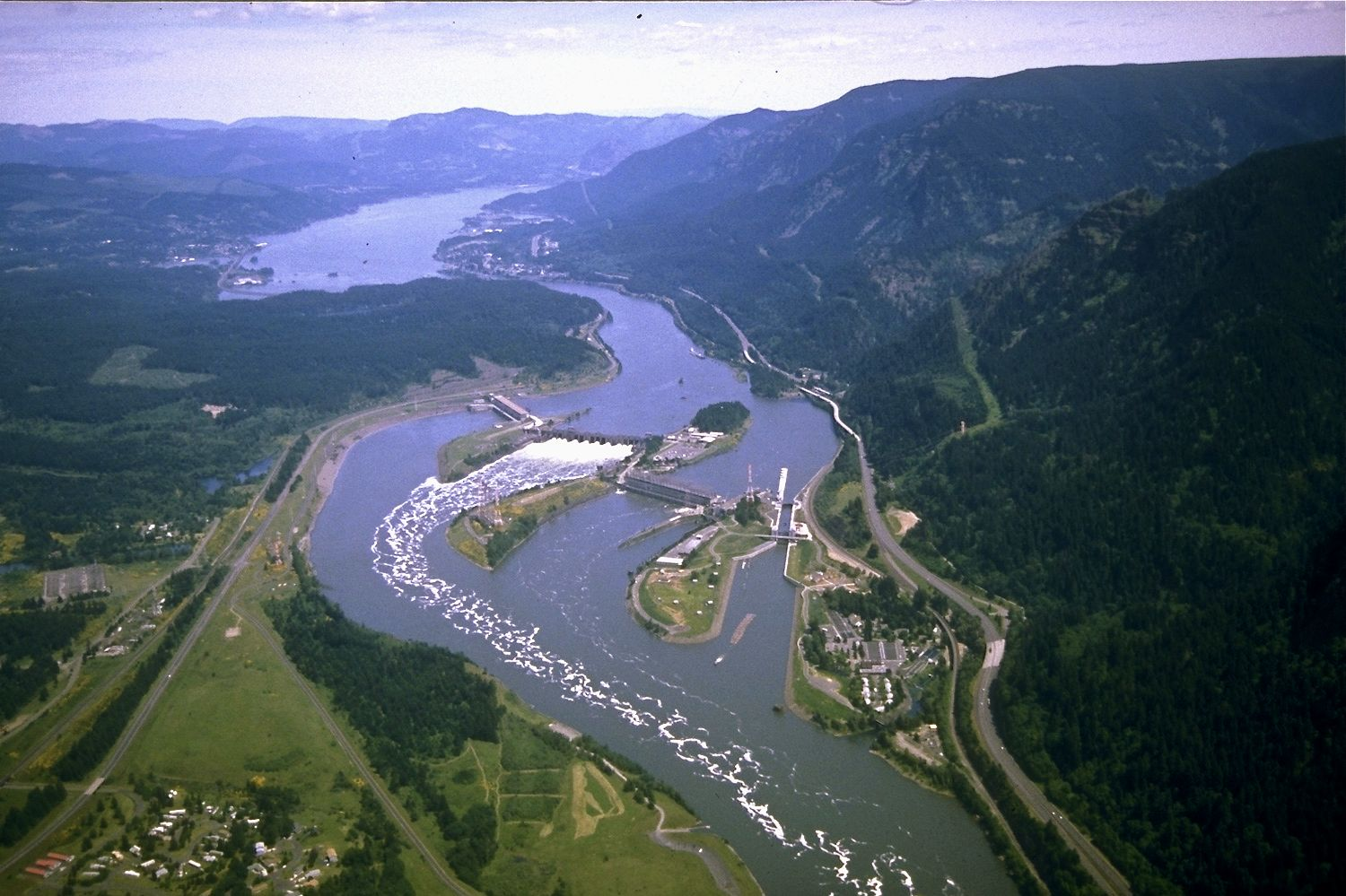
Aerial image of Bonneville dam showing reservoir. Notice the widening of the river and calm water upstream of the dam as compared to the pre-dam photo of the Cascades Rapids.

==== Nutrient ratios ====
Macronutrients, such as phosphorus, nitrogen, and silicate are strongly impacted by increased residence times in reservoirs created by dam construction throughout the Columbia River Basin. Exact nutrient retention rates can vary between 16 and 98 percent depending on local hydrology, reservoir design, and location in the basin. However, this increase in nutrient retention rates in the Columbia River basin has generally modified the relative ratios of available nutrients from their natural state, which has subsequently altered the efficiency of compound usage by primary producers such as diatoms.

Diatoms are directly affected by the hydrodynamic changes that reservoirs create. The slow moving, fresh water in reservoirs facilitates high settling rates for siliceous diatom shells, which can both bloom in the reservoir or be carried into the river from upstream. Diatom shells are negatively buoyant and have a natural tenancy to settle, this coupled with the reduced forward momentum of standing water in a reservoir, and the physical barrier a dam increase the settling rate of diatom shells within the reservoir. This high settling rate, coupled with slow dissolution of silicate in freshwater, leads to a net decrease in silicate recycling and reduced silicate transport through the Columbia River Basin and export out of the estuary resulting in a net decrease in the overall silicate budget.

These same hydrodynamic changes also result in a net increase in phosphorus and nitrogen recycling in reservoirs. Settling rates for algae, other than diatoms, are slow. Slow settling rates allow for algae to remain in the water column longer, allowing for increased release for organically bound phosphorus and nitrogen into the water column through remineralization.

The combine impact of increased silicate retention and increased remineralization of phosphorus and nitrogen can result in high N/Si and P/Si ratios within and below reservoirs; these increased rations can be further compounded by increase nitrogen and phosphorus concentrations from eutrophication. The high N/Si and P/Si rations caused by these processes can be harmful to the local ecosystem in the basin; for example, N/Si ratios greater than 1 can result in excess nitrogen relative to diatom requirements, this can promote the growth of other phytoplankton species, negatively affecting diatom communities.

This impact of reservoirs on the transport and recycling of silicate, phosphorus, and nitrogen, is not unique to the Columbia River Basin, but has had a measurable impact on the export of these nutrients through the basin and out of the estuary. As discussed in context with the PDO and ENSO, since 1858, total silicate export out of the Columbia river basin through the estuary has decreased over 50 percent with about 40 percent of that reduction liked directly to dam construction. Finally, as discussed above, these changed in nutrient ratios have largely contributed to the greening of the Columbia river estuary.

==== Methane ====
Reservoirs often serve as a catchment basin for organic matter such as vegetation, and waste transferred into the river via rainwater runoff. Initially, this organic matter provides a nutrient source; however, as it continues to accumulate and begins to decompose, the respiration of this organic matter can quickly deplete oxygen levels leading to anoxia. Under anoxic conditions, the large amount of organic matter are further broken down through anaerobic respiration and methanogenesis into carbon dioxide (CO_{2}) and methane (CH_{4}). These decomposition processes can occur rapidly after flooding, when large amount of fresh organic matter are transported into the river, and as a result methane and carbon dioxide release can be large.

Anaerobic respiration, which occurs in the absence of highly oxidizing molecular oxygen, utilizes less-oxidized electron acceptors such as nitrate (NO_{3}^{−}). As a result, high levels of anaerobic respiration can result in denitrification. This process of denitrification removes nitrogen from the Columbia River Basin, by converting available nitrogen, important for primary production, from its usable dissolved forms (i.e. NO_{3}^{−} and NO_{2}^{−}) to its gaseous form (N_{2}).

==== Salmon migration ====
Dams provide a barrier for migrating fish such as salmon, limiting their abilities to swim upstream. As discussed above, studies in the Pacific Northwest and Scandinavia have demonstrated that migratory fish can provide 30 percent or more of the phosphorus input to oligotrophic lakes. These rates of phosphorus fertilization, as well as similarly high rates of nitrogen fertilization, come from the decomposition of adult carcasses after mating and can be significantly affected by reduced migration caused by dam construction. Research estimates as much as 7 to 15 percent of the migrating salmon stock perish as they cross each consecutive dam. Lower rates of successful salmon migration redistribute the remineralization of nitrogen and phosphorus by reducing nitrogen and phosphorus fertilization upstream of dams, as a result there is a successive reduction in nutrients upstream of each consecutive dam. The redistribution of nutrients in the Columbia River Basin is currently a popular area of research; however, additional data is needed to determine the lasting implications of these changes.

== Water quality ==
The complexity of nutrient cycles is an enduring challenge to understanding ecosystem function. Particularly, in areas of significant habitation and modification by humans, these systems are experiencing rapid periods of alteration from historical precedents within the Columbia river Basin. These shifts in human habitation and impact have further complicated and obscured insights into the behavior of nutrient cycling. As the dominant water system in the Pacific Northwest and the home to nearly five million people, the Columbia River Basin integrates these numerous natural and anthropogenic biogeochemical processes. Consequently, the watershed is a foundational environmental resource, providing the region with many goods and services including jobs, natural materials (timber, fresh water), and recreation at a capital worth recently estimated to be $198 billion annually. However, the efficacy and ability of the system to provide these assets largely hinges upon the function of such essential ecosystem components like nutrient cycling. Perturbations to nutrient cycling may result in deleterious effects to both the environment and to resident human populations, possibly through the emergence of toxic plankton blooms, decreased aesthetic value, dissolved oxygen depletion, and reduced fish stocks. Ultimately, the sustainability of the Columbia River Basin ecosystem and its impact on residents are firmly connected by the function of nutrient cycles.
