= Clifton, Clatsop County, Oregon =

Unincorporated community in the state of Oregon, United States

Clifton, Oregon
- Unincorporated community
- Location within the state of Oregon Clifton (the United States)
- Coordinates: 46°12′39″N 123°27′44″W
- Country: United States
- State: Oregon
- County: Clatsop
- Elevation: 10 ft (3.0 m)
- Time zone: UTC-8 (Pacific (PST))
  - Summer (DST): UTC-7 (PDT)
- GNIS feature ID: 1119023

Clifton is an unincorporated community in Clatsop County, Oregon, United States. It is located north of U.S. Route 30, about nine miles northwest of Westport on the south bank of the Columbia River. It is on Clifton Channel across from Tenasillahe Island.

== History ==
Henry Harrison Hunt, an Oregon Trail pioneer of 1843, established a sawmill in the Clifton area in 1845. By 1851 Hunt had moved on. Later the site was an outpost for gillnetters. In 1873 brothers James W. and Vincent Cook, pioneers of the Pacific Northwest salmon packing industry, established the second salmon cannery in Clatsop County there. It is likely that settler Stephen G. Spear named his farm Clifton after the cliffs above the river before the land was owned by the Cook brothers. Clifton post office was established in 1874, with Vincent Cook as the first postmaster. The Astoria and South Coast Railway (later sold to the Spokane, Portland and Seattle Railway) was built through the area in 1898.

The cannery employed Chinese workers, who canned the fish caught by Greek, Yugoslav, and Italian fishermen. When the cannery closed in 1906, the Chinese left the town, leaving behind their bunkhouses (which no longer exist). The other immigrants settled in different parts of town. In its heyday, Clifton had two saloons, one with a combination skating rink and dance hall upstairs, two stores, a church, and a one-room schoolhouse. The railroad tracks served as the main street. In 1915 Clifton had a population of 200. The dance hall burned down in 1921. Clifton was not connected to U.S. 30 by road until 1937. Instead, to leave town people either boated across the Columbia to Cathlamet, Washington, or took the train to Astoria or Portland. In the early 20th century, there were five logging camps within three miles of Clifton and when the camps closed the loggers would move into town. By 1930 all logging activity in the area had ceased. Today Clifton is on the edge of the Clatsop State Forest. Electricity did not reach Clifton until 1958.

== Decline ==
Author Ralph Friedman considers Clifton a "picturesque ghost town". The town went into decline as the salmon runs were depleted. One store closed in 1950, the other closed in 1960 and was turned into an office for the caretaker of the town, which was then owned by Bumble Bee. As people moved out, the houses were dismantled for their lumber. Other buildings, such as the first store and the church, fell to splinters, while some structures fell into the river. The post office closed in 1966. As of 1990, very few structures were left in Clifton. The rail line that passes through the area is now operated by the Portland and Western Railroad (PNWR), who acquired it from the BNSF Railway. Clifton is still a PNWR station. There was renewed interest in the area in the early 2000s because of the proposed Bradwood Landing project.
