= Tenasillahe Island =

Island in the United States

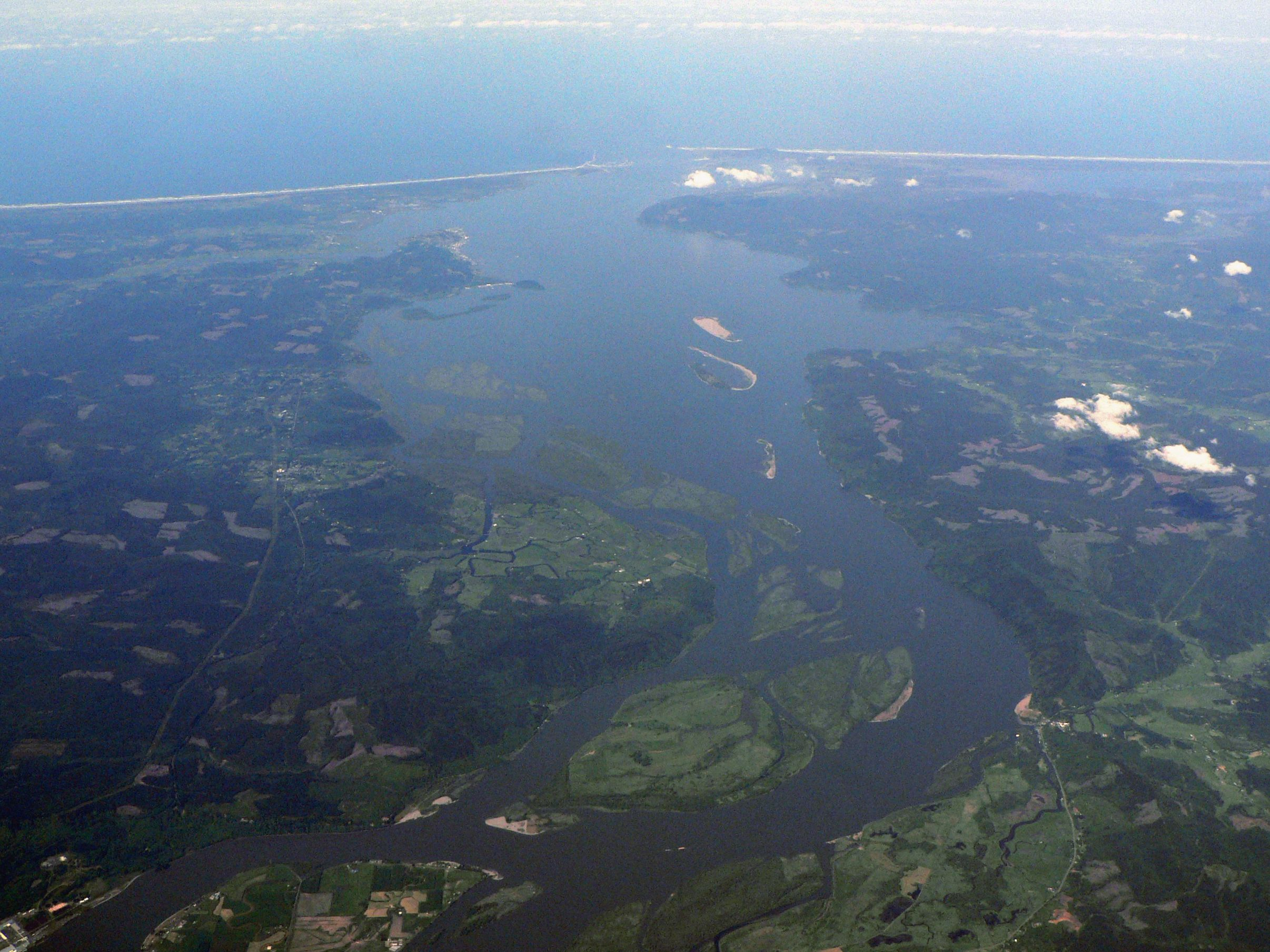
- Tenasillahe Island can be seen in the lower central portion of the image.
- Interactive map of Tenasillahe Island

Geography
- Coordinates: 46°13′45″N 123°27′22″W
- Adjacent to: Columbia River
- Highest elevation: 2 m (7 ft)

Administration
- United States
- State: Oregon
- County: Clatsop

Demographics
- Population: 0

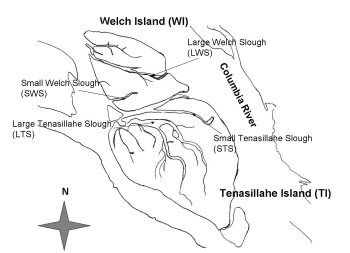
Map of Tenasillahe and Welch Islands

Tenasillahe Island is an island in the Columbia River Estuary portion of the Columbia River in Clatsop County, Oregon. It is separated from the mainland and the unincorporated community of Clifton, Oregon by the Clifton Channel, and from nearby Welch Island by the Red Slough.

The island was visited by the Lewis and Clark Expedition, and Tenasillahe and Welch were known as the "Marshy Islands".

The entire island is part of the Julia Butler Hansen Refuge for the Columbian white-tailed deer.

== Etymology ==
The name "Tenasillahe Island" is tautological, in that "Tenasillahe" means "island" in Chinook Jargon.
