= Torpenhow Hill =

Tautological name

Torpenhow Hill (locally /trəˈpɛnə/ trə-PEN-ə) is claimed to be the name of a hill near the village of Torpenhow in Cumbria, England. The name is tautological. According to an analysis by linguist Darryl Francis and locals, there is no landform formally known as Torpenhow Hill there, either officially or locally, which would make the term an example of a ghost word.

A. D. Mills in his Dictionary of English Place-Names interprets the name as "Ridge of the hill with a rocky peak", giving its etymology as Old English torr, Celtic *penn, and Old English hoh, each of which mean 'hill'. Thus, the name Torpenhow Hill could be interpreted as 'hill-hill-hill Hill'.

In 1688, Thomas Denton stated that Torpenhow Hall and church stand on a 'rising topped hill', which he assumed might have been the source of the name of the village. Denton apparently exaggerated the example to a "Torpenhow Hill", which would quadruple the "hill" element, but the existence of a toponym "Torpenhow Hill" is not substantiated.

In 1884, G. L. Fenton proposed the name as an example of "quadruple redundancy" in tautological place name etymologies, i.e. that all four elements of the name might mean "hill". It was used as a convenient example for the nature of loanword adoption by Thomas Comber around 1880.

== See also ==
- List of tautological place names
- Cumbrian toponymy
