= Clapton, Gloucestershire =

Village and civil parish in England

Coordinates: 51.8596°N 1.7649°W

Clapton
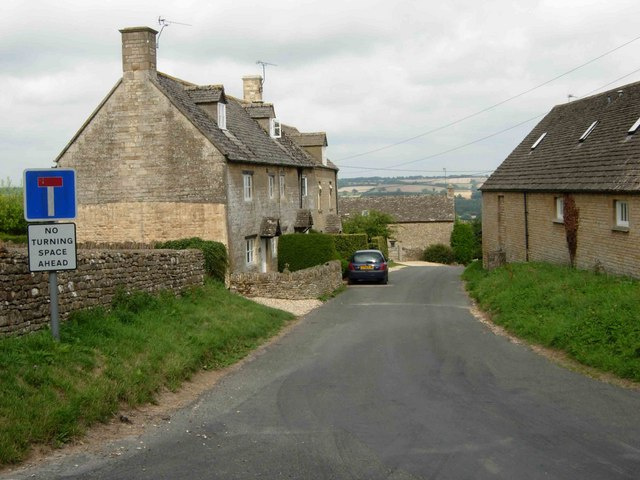

- Location within Gloucestershire
- Population: 110 (2019)
- Civil parish: Clapton
- District: Cotswold
- Shire county: Gloucestershire
- Region: South West
- Country: England
- Sovereign state: United Kingdom
- Post town: Berkeley
- Postcode district: GL54
- Police: Gloucestershire
- Fire: Gloucestershire
- Ambulance: South Western
- UK Parliament: North Cotswolds

Clapton, also known as Clapton-on-the-Hill, is a small village and civil parish in the district of Cotswold, in the county of Gloucestershire, England. In 2019 it had a population of 110.

== History ==
The name "Clapton" means 'hill farm/settlement', from the elements "clopp" + "tūn", rendering the modern name a tautology.
