= Bradwood Landing =

Coordinates: 46°12′03″N 123°26′43″W

Bradwood Landing was a proposed terminal for receiving liquefied natural gas (LNG) and converting the liquid back into a gas for transport via pipeline in the U.S. state of Oregon. The site of the development, which declared Chapter 7 bankruptcy in 2010 May, was on the Columbia River, east of Astoria.

== Bradwood Landing history ==
The site where NorthernStar Natural Gas wanted to build the Bradwood Landing LNG terminal is 22 miles (35 km) upriver from Astoria. The site is zoned "marine industrial" and was once the location of Bradwood, a company town of the Bradley-Woodward Lumber Company. The mill closed in 1962 and burned in 1965. The surrounding area is now a mostly undeveloped mix of forest and wetland. NorthernStar began the process by filing a notice of intent with Oregon state regulators in April 2005. The project was approved by the Federal Energy Regulatory Commission in September 2008. State permits were not obtained. On May 4, 2010, NorthernStar Natural Gas filed for bankruptcy, pulling funding for this project.

== Bradwood specifics ==
The development would cover 55 acres (22 ha) of a 420-acre (170 ha) lot. The facility would consist of two storage tanks, with a peak send-out capacity of 1.3 billion cubic feet of natural gas a day.

== Benefits ==
When the Bradwood Landing project was initiated, it appeared that domestic sources of natural gas were dwindling. Since then, new technology for extracting shale gas in the United States has reversed those predictions as ample new sources of natural gas are being tapped within the United States. However, by having access to both domestic and foreign sources of gas, West Coast natural gas suppliers would have more freedom to play the market and could potentially keep gas prices lower. Construction of Bradwood Landing would have generated 450 construction jobs over a three-year period, plus 65 permanent jobs once the project was complete. The project could bring additional economic benefits to the area by stimulating the local economy and increasing revenue from taxes and port fees.

== Drawbacks ==
Environmental groups, led by Columbia Riverkeeper, have been at the forefront of opposition to Bradwood Landing, but there are drawbacks to the project in a number of arenas.

=== Environmental issues ===
The construction of Bradwood Landing would require disruption of important salmon habitat, and is in an area where the Chinook salmon and Coho salmon populations have been designated as threatened by the United States Fish and Wildlife Service. The project calls for dredging of 700,000 cubic yards of material from the Columbia River Engines expelling hot water are another issue as cold water is crucial to the salmon. Natural gas is a cleaner fuel than coal, but much of that benefit is lost when the gas in imported. LNG has as much as 30 percent higher greenhouse gas impact than domestic natural gas The State of Oregon's analysis found imported LNG to be equivalent to coal for greenhouse gas emissions. The construction of an affiliated 220-mile (350 km) natural gas pipeline raises additional environmental concerns.

=== Safety ===
LNG tankers and regasification plants in general have good safety records. In the unlikely event of an accident or terrorist attack, however, the results could be catastrophic.

Spilled LNG disperses into the air; however, due to its temperature (−260 °F), it hugs the Earth's surface until it warms by 100 °F. Until sufficiently warming to rise into the atmosphere, LNG vapor that can drift with the wind and is capable of igniting if it comes into contact with an ignition source and if the concentration of natural gas in the vapor is between five and 15 percent. (Note: Natural gas vapors have a gas-to-air flammability range of 5-15%, a 10% range, the most flammability of all common hydrocarbon fuels. Gasoline's flammability range is 1.4-7.6%, a 6.2% range. Propane's flammability range is 2.2-9.5%, a 7.3% range.) A report prepared by Sandia National Laboratories analyzing the risks of a large LNG spill over water describes a hazard zone of over a mile for an accidental spill, and of 2.2 miles (3.5 km) for an intentionally caused breach, as in a terrorist attack.

=== Policy ===
The State of Oregon has objected to the process by which the Federal Energy Regulatory Commission approved Bradwood Landing. The state's Department of Energy determined that Oregon was not in need of additional imported natural gas This raises the question of how LNG fits into Oregon's energy future, with some opponents concerned that the gas would end up being sent to California or that ultimately the terminal could be used to export gas from the United States.

== The Palomar Pipeline ==
A joint venture of TransCanada and NW Natural, the Palomar Gas Transmission pipeline would be 220 miles (350 km) long. A map of the proposed route of the pipeline shows its northern terminus at the Bradwood Landing interconnect. The route travels south through Clatsop, Washington and Yamhill counties, then veers east near McMinnville to pass through Marion, Clackamas and Wasco counties to join an existing pipeline near Shaniko, Oregon. The route includes a large amount of rural private property as well as land in the Mount Hood National Forest. In July 2010, Palomar's sponsors slowed down the application process to review their options in light of Bradwood's bankruptcy.
