= Pedro Colina Hill =

Hill in Cotabato City, Philippines

- Tantawan
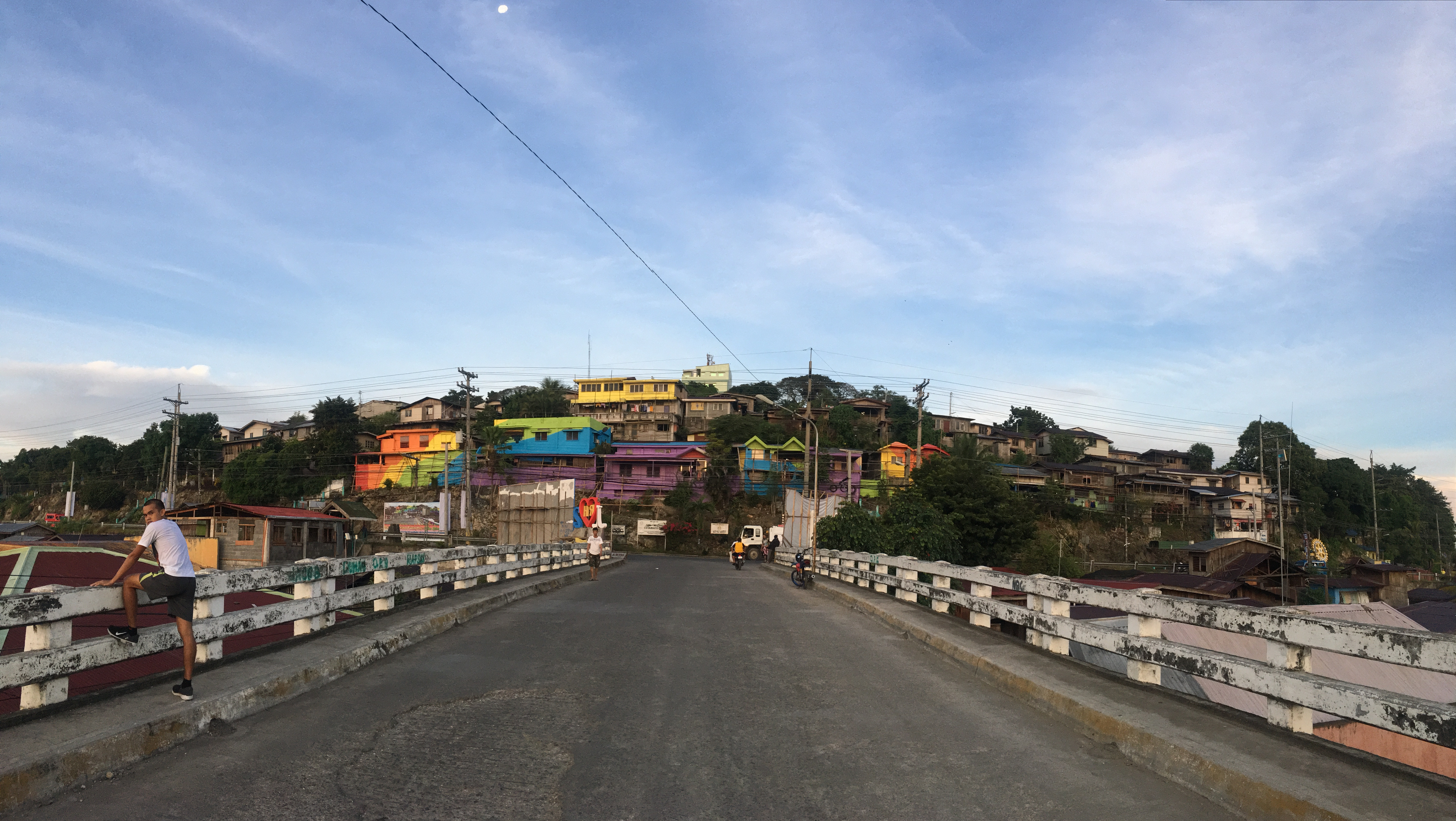

Highest point
- Elevation: 27.4 m (90 ft)
- Coordinates: 7°13′11.6″N 124°14′38.3″E

Naming
- Etymology: Peter the Apostle and Spanish word for "hill" (colina).
- Nickname: PC Hill
- Native name: Tantawan (Maguindanaon)
- English translation: "extensive view"

Geography
- Location: Cotabato City
- Country: Philippines
- Region: Bangsamoro

Pedro Colina Hill, also known as PC Hill or Tantawan, is a hill in Cotabato City, Philippines.

== Geography ==
Pedro Colina Hill is one of the two prominent elevated area in Cotabato City, the other being Timako Hill. The hill also host a network of caves. PC Hill has an elevation of 27.4 meters (90 ft).

== Etymology ==
The name of hill, Pedro Colina Hill was named after Peter the Apostle (or San Pedro) by the Spaniards in the 1800s, during the time when the Spanish began exploring South Central Mindanao. "Colina" means hill in Spanish, hence Pedro Colina Hill's name is tautological or redundant. The hill is also traditionally known as Tantawan, which means "extensive view".

== Cultural significance ==
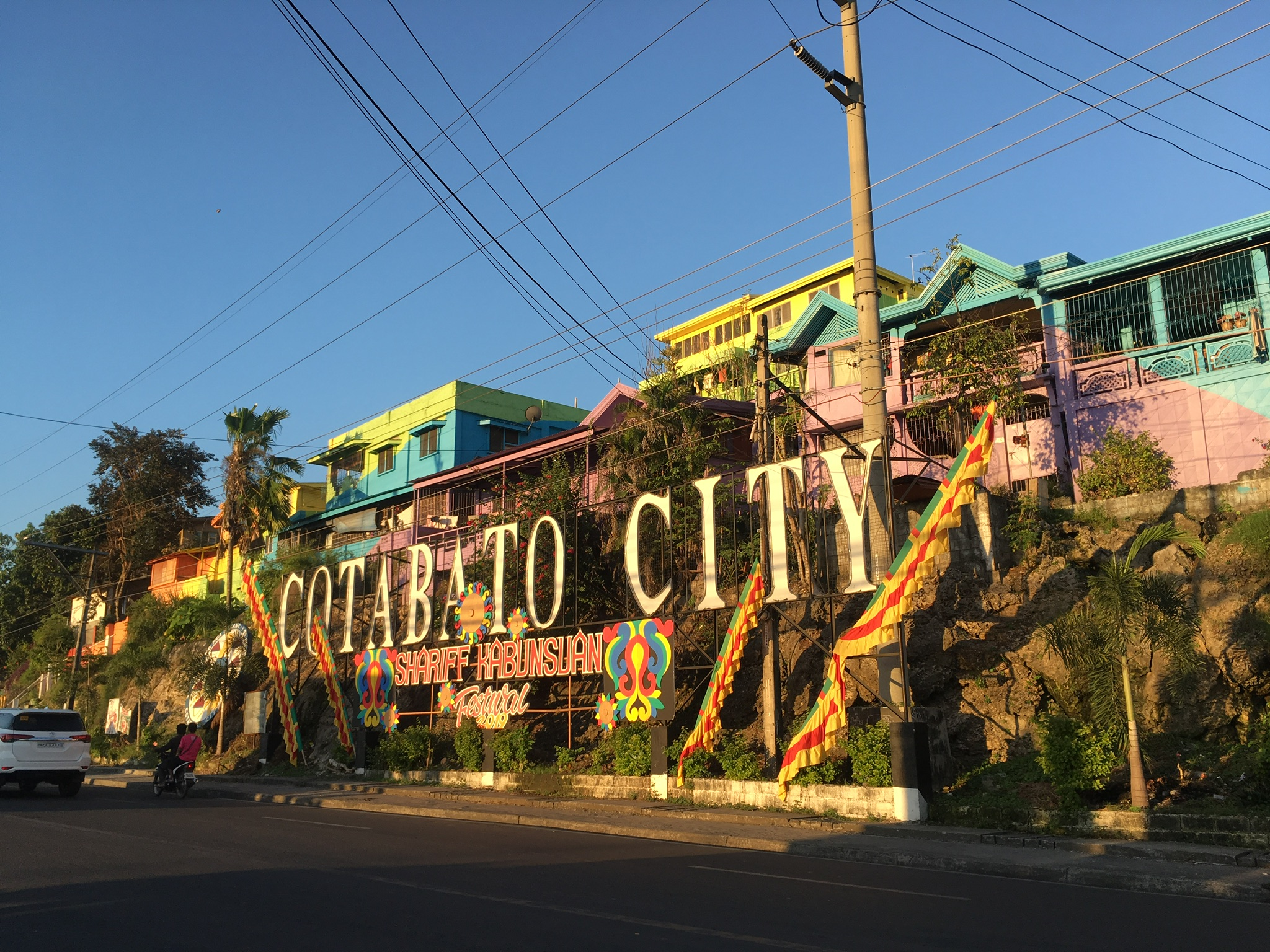
Signage at PC Hill, baring the name of Cotabato City.

Cotabato City derived from PC Hill, which historically was used as a fort by natives in the area. Cotabato City's name was derived from Kutang Bato or "stone fort". In Maguindanaon, the hill is known as "Tantawan".

The hill linked to the history of Cotabato City's indigenous peoples (IPs), including the Teduray, Dulangan Manobo, and the Maguindanao peoples. The IPs share roots to brothers, Mamalu and Tabunaway who ruled the area as chieftains who set up their center of governance in what is now known as PC Hill until the introduction of Islam in the area sometime in the 15th century. When the Cotabato area experienced floods, the hill was used as a refuge by the area's early inhabitants.

PC Hill is a military reservation area. Many of local law enforcement agencies hold office in the hill including the Cotabato City Police, and regional offices of the Philippine Drug Enforcement Agency, and the Criminal Investigation and Detection Group. Most of the hill's residents as of 2018 are retired local military and police personnel. The Philippine Constabulary also had a local headquarters on the hill during the American colonial administration. The "P.C." in the hill's name is sometimes mistaken for to mean "Philippine Constabulary".

In 2018, houses in PC Hill were painted rainbow with motifs relevant to Cotabato City's history and culture such as crabs, gongs, and the guinakit (Moro boats) as part of an effort to redevelop the site and boost tourism in the city.
