= Estuarine water circulation =

Estuarine water circulation is controlled by the inflow of rivers, the tides, rainfall and evaporation, the wind, and other oceanic events such as an upwelling, an eddy, and storms. Estuarine water circulation patterns are influenced by vertical mixing and stratification, and can affect residence time and exposure time.

== Residence time ==
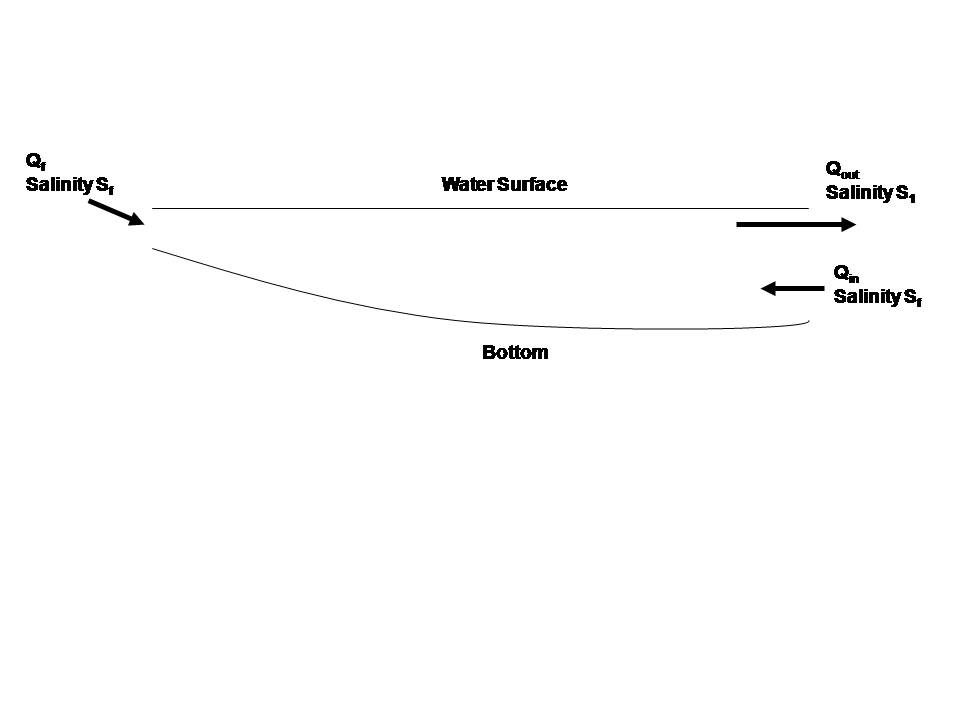
Model of Estuary

The residence time of water is a key variable determining the health of an estuary, particularly from human-induced stresses. Rapid flushing ensures that there is insufficient time for sediment accumulation or dissolved oxygen depletion in the estuary; thus a well flushed estuary is intrinsically more robust than a poorly flushed estuary. Residence time also affects other parameters such as heavy metals, dissolved nutrients, suspended solids, and algal blooms that may affect the health of estuaries.

A simple way to calculate residence time is using a simple classic estuary model, which can be useful for acquiring a conceptual understanding of an estuary, but is coarse in time and space. A classic estuary has the following components: 1) freshwater inflow with a discharge Q_{f} and a salinity S_{f} (generally S_{f} = 0); 2) oceanic inflow with a discharge Q_{in} and salinity S_{0}; and 3) outflow to the ocean with a discharge of Q_{out} and a salinity S_{1}. The inflow and outflow of water is equal because mass is conserved. Salt is also conserved, therefore, the inflow and outflow fluxes of salinity are also equal. If groundwater inputs and evaporation are ignored, the continuity equation is:

Q_{in} S_{0} + Q_{f} S_{f} = Q_{out} S_{1}

The residence time T is the volume of freshwater within the estuary divided by the flow rate of the river, and can be approximated as:

T = (Vol/ Q_{f} )(1 - S_{1}/ S_{0} - S_{f} / S_{0})

where Vol is the total volume of water within the estuary.

== Exposure time ==
Residence time considers the time it takes for the water particles to leave the estuary, however, some water particles that leave the estuary during an ebb tide may re-enter the system during a flood tide. The amount of time a water particle spends in the estuary until it never returns is called exposure time. The exposure time can be much larger than the residence time if the water particles are leaving with the ebb tides and returning with the rising tide. The ratio between the number of water particles returning to the estuary and the number of water particles leaving is known as the return coefficient, r.

In order to quantify exposure time, the water circulation outside of the estuary must be determined. However, the circulation near the mouth of the estuary is complex due to the tidal mixing processes that occur between the estuarine and ocean waters. If the coast is rugged with headlands, a mosaic of complex flow fields consisting of eddies, jets, and stagnation zones will occur, further complicating the circulation patterns outside of the estuary.

In cases involving deltas or wetlands that drain into multiple tidal creeks, such as Missionary Bay, Australia, water leaving one creek at the ebb tide may enter another estuary during the flood tide. When there is a series of estuaries involved, a large exposure time (larger than that of the individual estuaries), will occur if the tidal outflow from one estuary re-enters a different estuary during the flood tide. Along a rugged coastline with headlands, however, mixing of estuary and oceanic waters can be intense. When estuarine water leaves the estuary, it gets flushed out to coastal waters, so exposure time and residence time are close equal.

In some cases it is possible to measure the fluxes of volume, salt, and temperature across the mouth of an estuary through a tidal cycle. Using this data, (1-r) can be calculated (r is the return coefficient): it is equal to the fraction of the volume of water V_{TP} (mean tidal prism volume) leaving the estuary during the ebb tide that is replaced with coastal waters prior to re-entering the system. When r = 1, the same water is re-entering the estuary, and if r = 0, the estuarine water that has left the estuary during the ebb tide has been replaced with coastal waters entering the estuary during the rising tide. The exposure time τ' is estimated by:

τ' = V_{estuary} T_{tide} / (1-r) V_{TP}

V_{estuary} is defined as the mean estuarine volume and T_{tide} is the tidal period.

The total fluxes of brackish water through the river mouth during tidal events is often much higher (often by a factor of 10 to 100) than the volume flux from riverine inflow. Therefore, if measurements are not precise, the estimate of the net flux will be unreliable. Direct measurements of the return coefficient are often complicated by unsteady oceanic events such an upwelling, the passage of an eddy, or storms, so the success of a correct direct measurement of the return coefficient is rare.

== Vertical mixing and stratification ==
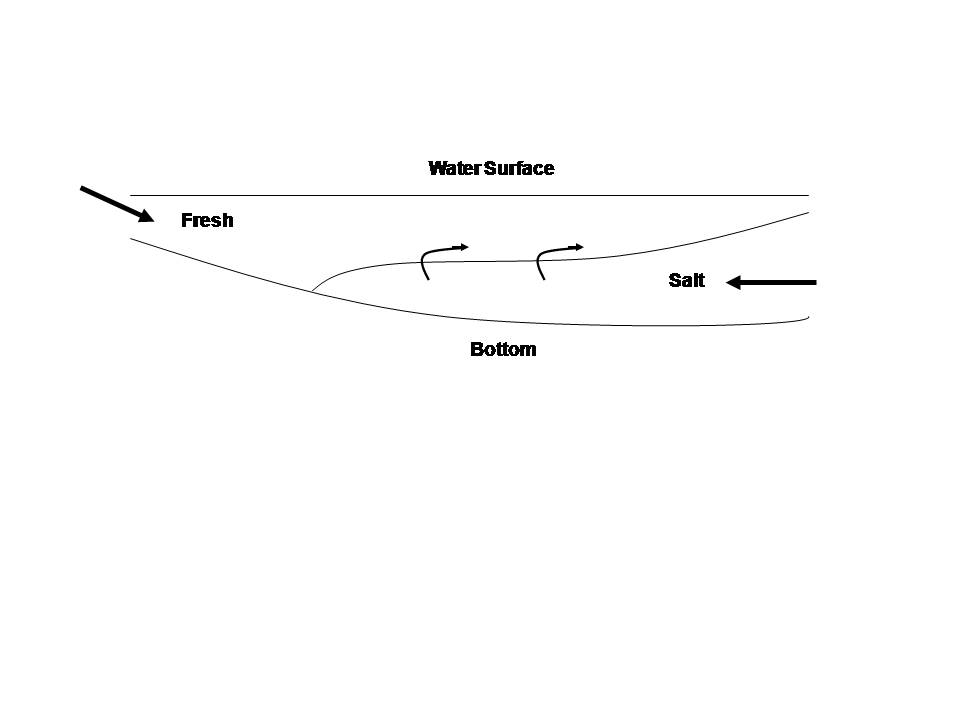
Salt Wedge Estuary

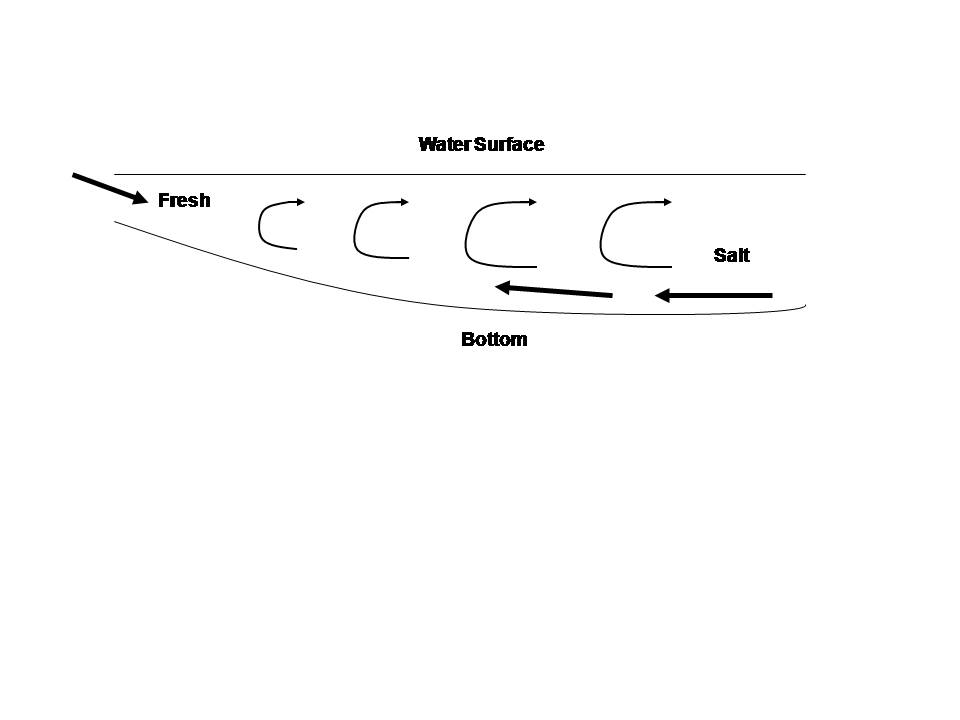
Partially Mixed Estuary

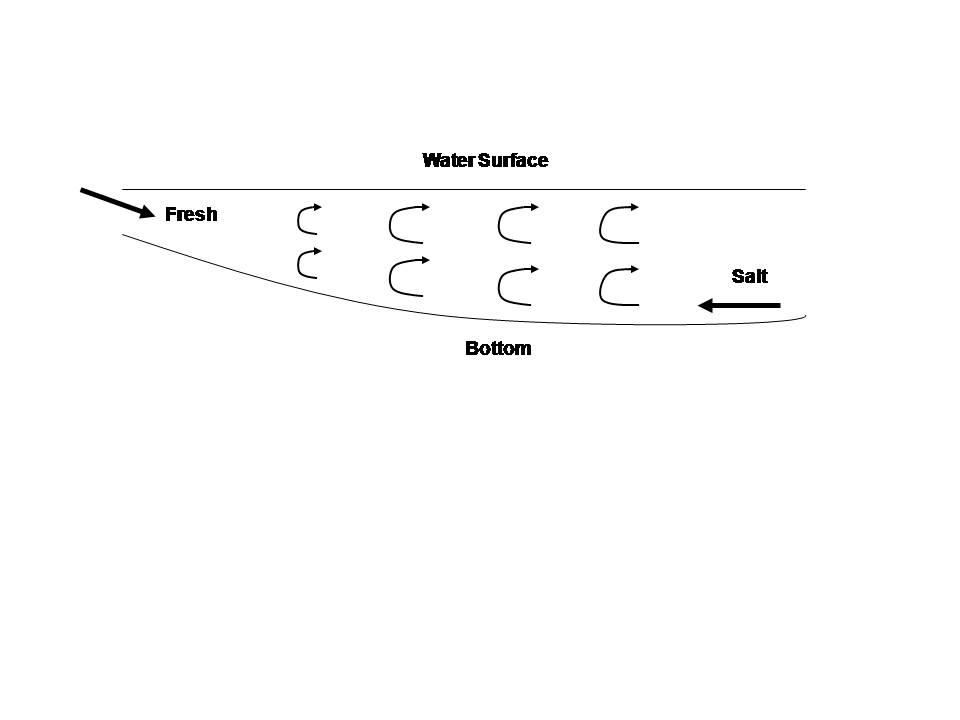
Vertically Homogeneous Estuary

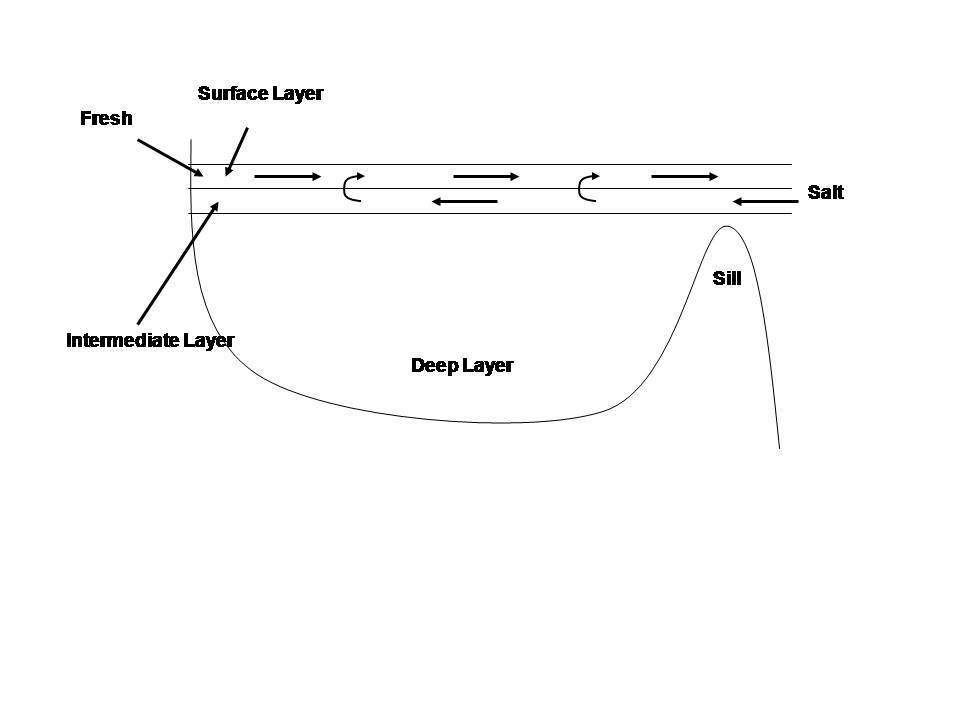
Fjord

The residence time of water in an estuary is dependent on the circulation within the estuary that is driven by density differences due to changes in salinity and temperature. Less dense freshwater floats over saline water and warmer water floats above colder water (temperatures greater than 4 °C). As a result, near-surface and near-bottom waters can have different trajectories, resulting in different residence times.

Vertical mixing determines how much the salinity and temperature will change from the top to the bottom, profoundly affecting water circulation. Vertical mixing occurs at three levels: from the surface downward by wind forces, the bottom upward by boundary generated turbulence (estuarine and oceanic boundary mixing), and internally by turbulent mixing caused by the water currents which are driven by the tides, wind, and river inflow.

Different types of estuarine circulation result from vertical mixing:

=== Salt wedge estuary ===
These estuaries are characterized by a sharp density interface between the upper layer of freshwater and the bottom layer of saline water. River water dominates in this system, and tidal effects have a small role in the circulation patterns. The freshwater floats on top of the seawater and gradually thins as it moves seaward. The denser seawater moves along the bottom up the estuary forming a wedge shaped layer and becoming thinner as it moves landward. As a velocity difference develops between the two layers, shear forces generate internal waves at the interface, mixing the seawater upward with the freshwater. An example is the Mississippi estuary.

=== Partially stratified estuary ===
As tidal forcing increases, the control of river flow on the pattern of circulation in the estuary becomes less dominating. Turbulent mixing induced by the current creates a moderately stratified condition. Turbulent eddies mix the water column, creating a mass transfer of freshwater and seawater in both directions across the density boundary. Therefore, the interface separating the upper and lower water masses is replaced with a water column with a gradual increase in salinity from surface to bottom. A two layered flow still exists however, with the maximum salinity gradient at mid depth. Partially stratified estuaries are typically shallow and wide, with a greater width to depth ratio than salt wedge estuaries. An example is the Thames.

=== Vertically homogeneous estuary ===
In these estuaries, tidal flow is greater relative to river discharge, resulting in a well mixed water column and the disappearance of the vertical salinity gradient. The freshwater-seawater boundary is eliminated due to the intense turbulent mixing and eddy effects. The width to depth ratio of vertically homogeneous estuaries is large, with the limited depth creating enough vertical shearing on the seafloor to mix the water column completely. If tidal currents at the mouth of an estuary are strong enough to create turbulent mixing, vertically homogeneous conditions often develop.

=== Fjords ===
Fjords are examples of highly stratified estuaries; they are basins with sills and have freshwater inflow that greatly exceeds evaporation. Oceanic water is imported in an intermediate layer and mixes with the freshwater. The resulting brackish water is then exported into the surface layer. A slow import of seawater may flow over the sill and sink to the bottom of the fjord (deep layer), where the water remains stagnant until flushed by an occasional storm.

=== Inverse estuary ===
Inverse estuaries occur in dry climates where evaporation greatly exceeds the inflow of freshwater. A salinity maximum zone is formed, and both riverine and oceanic water flow close to the surface towards this zone. This water is pushed downward and spreads along the bottom in both the seaward and landward direction. The maximum salinity can reach extremely high values and the residence time can be several months. In these systems, the salinity maximum zone acts like a plug, inhibiting the mixing of estuarine and oceanic waters so that freshwater does not reach the ocean. The high salinity water sinks seaward and exits the estuary.

Inverse estuaries also occur in humid climates with high precipitation, where freshwater input to a coastal region is greater at the seaward end of the estuary. An example is Saanich Inlet (a fjord) on the southeast coast of Vancouver Island. Here, freshwater inputs from the Fraser and Cowichan Rivers, which are nearby and outside of the fjord, are greater than from the smaller rivers emptying into the fjord. The resulting circulation within the fjord is very weak, and generally reverse that of positive estuarine circulation.
