= Withlacoochee River =

Withlacoochee River may refer to:

- Withlacoochee River (Suwannee River), a.k.a. Withlacoochee River (North), which originates in Georgia but ends in Florida
- Withlacoochee River (Florida), a.k.a. Withlacoochee River (South), which flows entirely through Florida
