= Columbia River Estuary =

Estuary in Washington and Oregon, USA

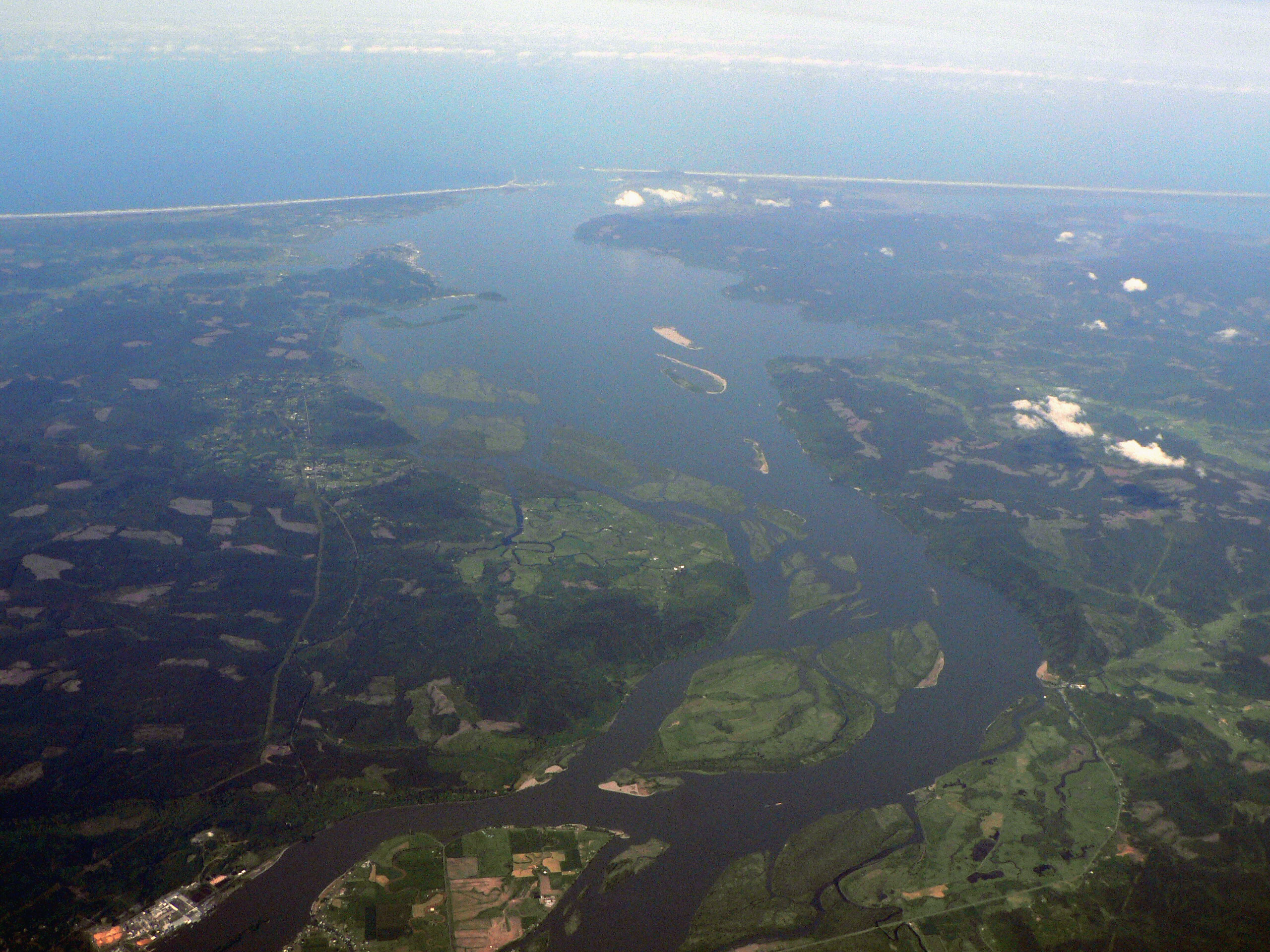
- Aerial image of the mouth of the Estuary

Physical characteristics
- Source: Columbia River
  - location: Columbia Lake, BC, Canada
- Mouth: Pacific Ocean
  - location: Cape Disappointment State Park / Fort Stevens State Park
  - coordinates: 46.2536° N, 124.0585° W

The Columbia River Estuary is situated on the Oregon–Washington border and the Pacific Coast of the United States. It was traditionally inhabited by the Chinook Native Americans and discovered by settlers in 1788. The Estuary plays host to a plethora of species of marine and terrestrial flora and fauna, and multiple conservation organisations exist that maintain the area. Geologically, it is situated on a continental margin of the North American Plate.

== The extent of the Columbia River Estuary ==
Geographically, the Estuary of the Columbia River is defined as extending inland as far as the Bonneville Dam. It is the furthest point at which fluctuation of free-flowing water levels based on tide is substantial enough to be recorded.

== First Nation Peoples ==
The Columbia River (Chinookan: hayásh-tsəqʷ, meaning “great water”) was a bustling hub of trade for Native Americans in the Pacific Northwest for centuries. In fact, archaeological evidence has proven that humans have inhabited the area for around 10 000 years. Today, the traditional owners and first people of the Columbia River Estuary are the Chinook Native Americans, who occupied a large stretch of the Northern shore.

The Chinookans were a prosperous people whose economy revolved predominantly around the trade of salmon during the summer months. They were known for their fishing technique called seining, in which a weighted net was dragged into the river and pulled back to shore, trapping salmon. Additionally, the tribes relied on local fauna during the winter months, when they would move to winter villages along the Columbia's tributaries: namely game, fowl and local flora.

=== Mythology: creation of the Estuary ===
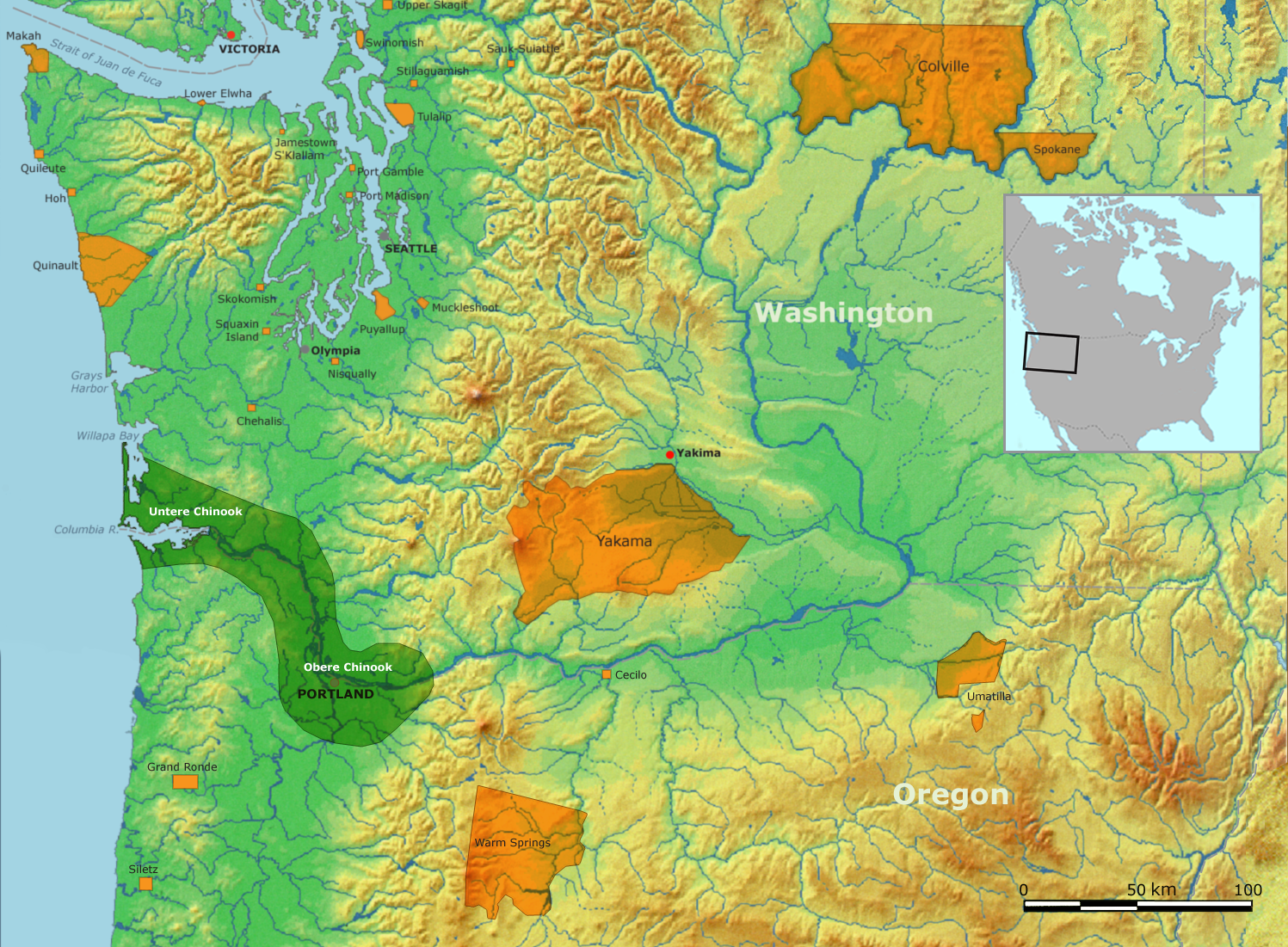
Map of Chinook tribal territory

Before men existed and the animal people ruled, the huge beaver, Wishpoosh, who lived in the Keechelus Lake, would take and destroy lesser creatures. Eventually the coyote god (of the Columbia region), Speelyei, stood up to him to reign in his behaviour. However, this dissatisfied Wishpoosh and in his fury he burst the banks of the lake, which flooded the adjacent canyon and formed a new great lake, in the Kittitas Valley. The fight continued, and the edges of this new lake held strong, but the wrath of Wishpoosh was such that they eventually gave way as well, and the area around Yakima, WA was flooded. Wishpoosh and Speelyei fought on, until the new lake extended West all the way to the junction of the Yakima, Snake and Columbia Rivers, which had for a long time been dammed by the Umatilla Highlands. This huge lake now had its Eastern border at the Umatilla Highlands and its Western border at the Cascade Range. The fighting did not cease, and ultimately, the enormous Cascade Mountains were breached, and the water that had accumulated raced to the sea, creating the Columbia River Estuary. Thus the “Great Water” assumed the flow that it follows today, and Speelyei finally killed Wishpoosh out in the open ocean; his body washed up south of the Estuary.

=== Colonisation ===
After colonisation, the Chinookans signed a treaty with Anson Dart in 1851 to grant their people the right to stay on their traditional lands at the Estuary rather than be moved to a reservation east of the Cascade Range. However, the US congress never ratified the treaty, resulting in conflicts and a string of legal battles that began in 1899 and have continued to the present day.

== Discovery ==
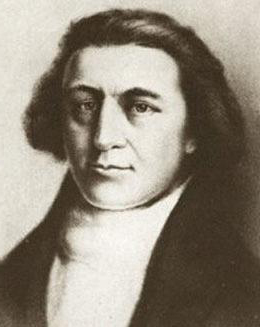
Robert Gray

In 1788 a fur trader named John Meares came within kilometres of discovering the Estuary; however, his ship could not navigate the rough breakers at the bar, and he ended up deciding that there was not a river behind it at all. He did name the Northern point Cape Disappointment (Chinookan: kah’see). In 1792, Robert Gray, an American fur trader, crossed the bar in his ship the Columbia Redeviva and became the first white settler to enter the estuary, subsequently naming the estuary Gray's Bay and the river Columbia River. During the 20th century, there existed some ambiguity with regards to who discovered the estuary, though today it is unequivocally considered to be Gray.

== Geology ==
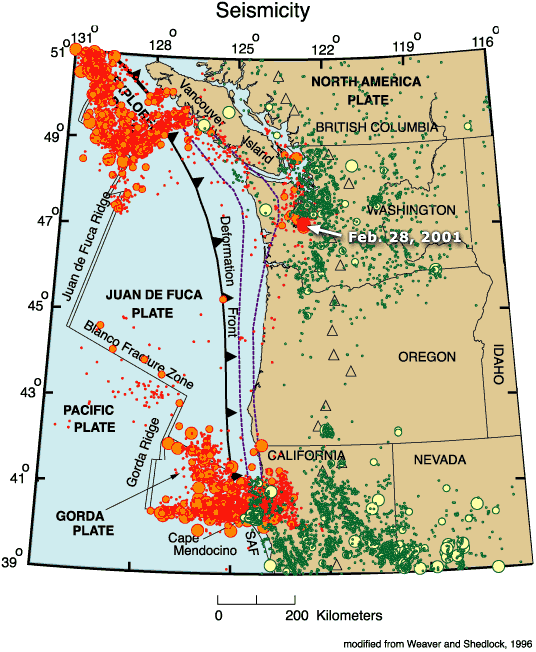
The Juan de Fuca Plate, black arrows indicate the direction of subduction

The Columbia River Estuary is in a valley that has been cut into marine sediments and volcanic rocks from the Tertiary period. The estuary receives large volumes of water from the Cascade Range, mountains to its east that trap precipitation and moisture. Pleistocene and Holocene sediments have filled the valley and continue to do so, dominating the estuary's morphology.

=== Plate Tectonics ===
The estuary is part of the North American plate and sits on an active continental margin. The Juan de Fuca plate is subducting underneath it and has resulted in eruptions of andesitic volcanoes in the Cascade Range (See: Mt St Helens). Additionally, tilting of the continental crust has occurred, resulting in the coastal region around the estuary being uplifted and some of Washington and Oregon's interior regions being downwarped along a trough. This, along with volcanism, effects sediment supply to the Estuary, which is comparatively low to other estuarine environments.

=== Seismology ===
The estuary's tectonic environment is prone to low severity deep-focus earthquakes.

== Flora and Fauna ==
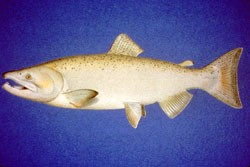
Chinook salmon

The Columbia River Estuary is an extremely biodiverse system, playing host (at some stage in their lifetime or another) to over 70 species of fish, hundreds of species of birds and many reptiles, mammals and amphibians. The number of invertebrate species has not been counted. A comprehensive list containing all the animal species can be found here.

== Conservation ==
Despite hosting a myriad of life, in the modern era the Estuary has been subject to major changes due to human impact, such that it has undergone many physical changes regarding both the land and water in and around it. Consequently, local biodiversity has been put at risk as many species rely on an evolved and diverse environment in the estuary.

The predominant human activities that have historically altered the estuary are jetty construction, diking and dredging. The direct results of these (among less pertinent natural changes) are huge losses of marshes and other shoreline habitats, reduced tidal prism and reduced tidal mixing. Of the higher than 50% of total wetlands that have been lost in the estuary's history, over 70% was due to diking and filling. Meanwhile, it is estimated that at this moment had the estuary remained untouched it would have been able to support up to 138 times the number of herbivores it currently does.

Two conservation organisations that operate in the Columbia River Estuary have been working for decades to preserve the environment, working in a wide variety of fields that span from habitat restoration planning and implementation to environmental monitoring and GIS mapping. Between them, the Lower Columbia Estuary Partnership (LCEP) and the Columbia River Estuary Study Taskforce (CREST) have completed many projects that serve to maintain the estuary's ecosystem.

=== Batwater Station Floodplain Restoration Project ===
Run by LCEP, this project reconnected 26 acres (11 ha) of marshes to the Columbia River Estuary. The project rejuvenated habitats that are used by endangered fish species while simultaneously reintroducing local flora. Structures for beavers were installed and land was revegetated to induce natural environmental processes.

=== Louisiana Swamp Restoration ===
Run by LCEP, this restoration reconnected 35 acres (14 ha) of habitat to the estuary. The swamp was surrounded and inaccessible to fish, such that the project involved allowing tidal waters to flow in and out in order to restore natural processes. Though beneficial for marine fauna, this project was significant as large quantities of invasive plants were removed and replaced by local vegetation that currently supports an abundance of animals that live in the land around the estuary.

== Tourism ==
The land around the estuary contains hiking trails for tourists. Additionally, local companies run boat tours around the area.
