= Medina Haram Piazza =

All-weather prayer cover in Medina

Medina Haram Piazza Shading Umbrellas
- أظلة ساحة الحرم النبوي
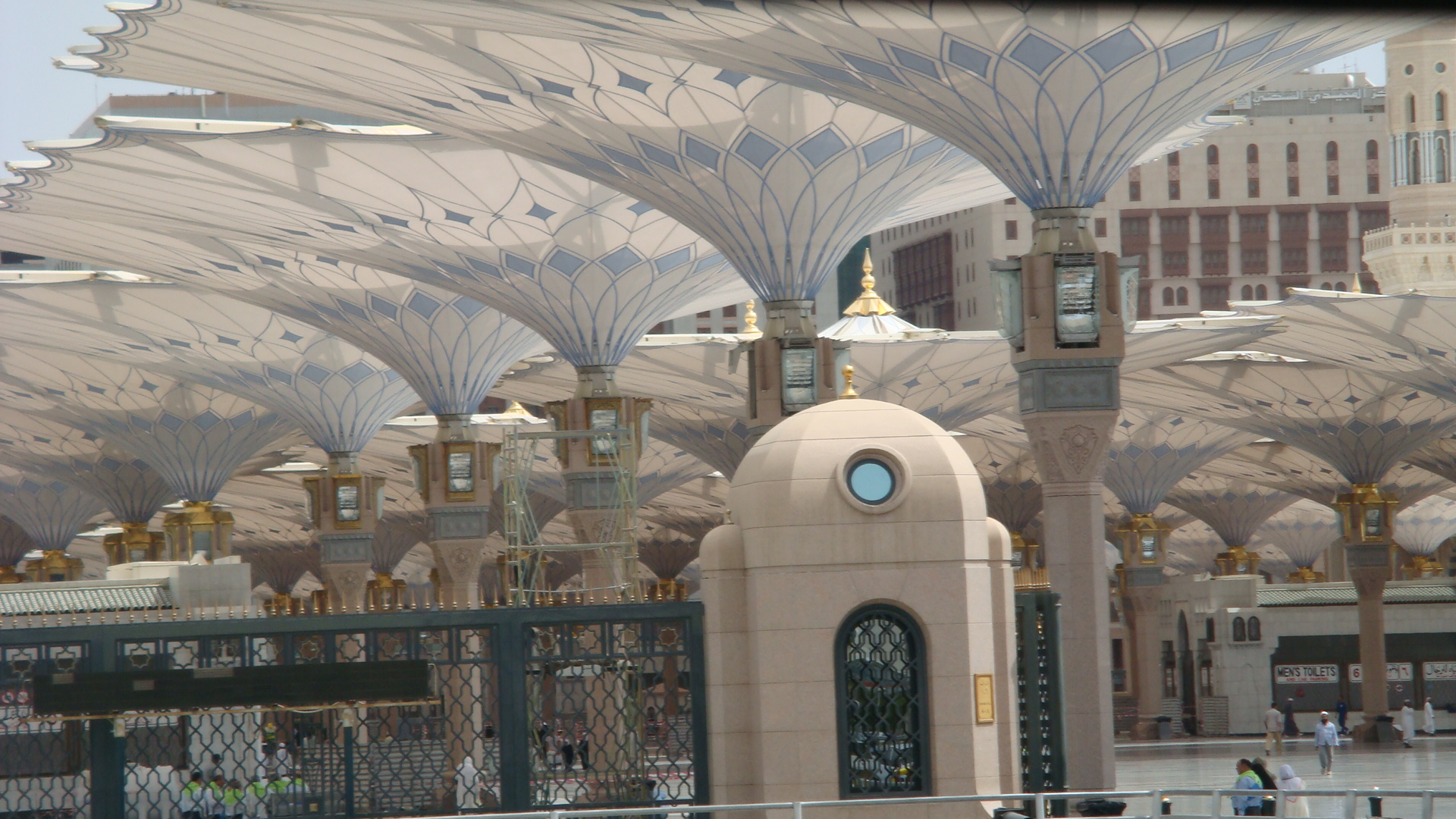
- Overview of the shading umbrellas at Al-Masjid an-Nabawi

General information
- Location: Al-Masjid an-Nabawi, Medina, Saudi Arabia
- Completed: August 2010
- Cost: ر.س 4,700,000,000

Technical details
- Material: PTFE fabric, glass fiber epoxy resin laminate

Design and construction
- Architects: SL Rasch GmbH Special and Lightweight Structures
- Main contractor: Saudi Binladin Group

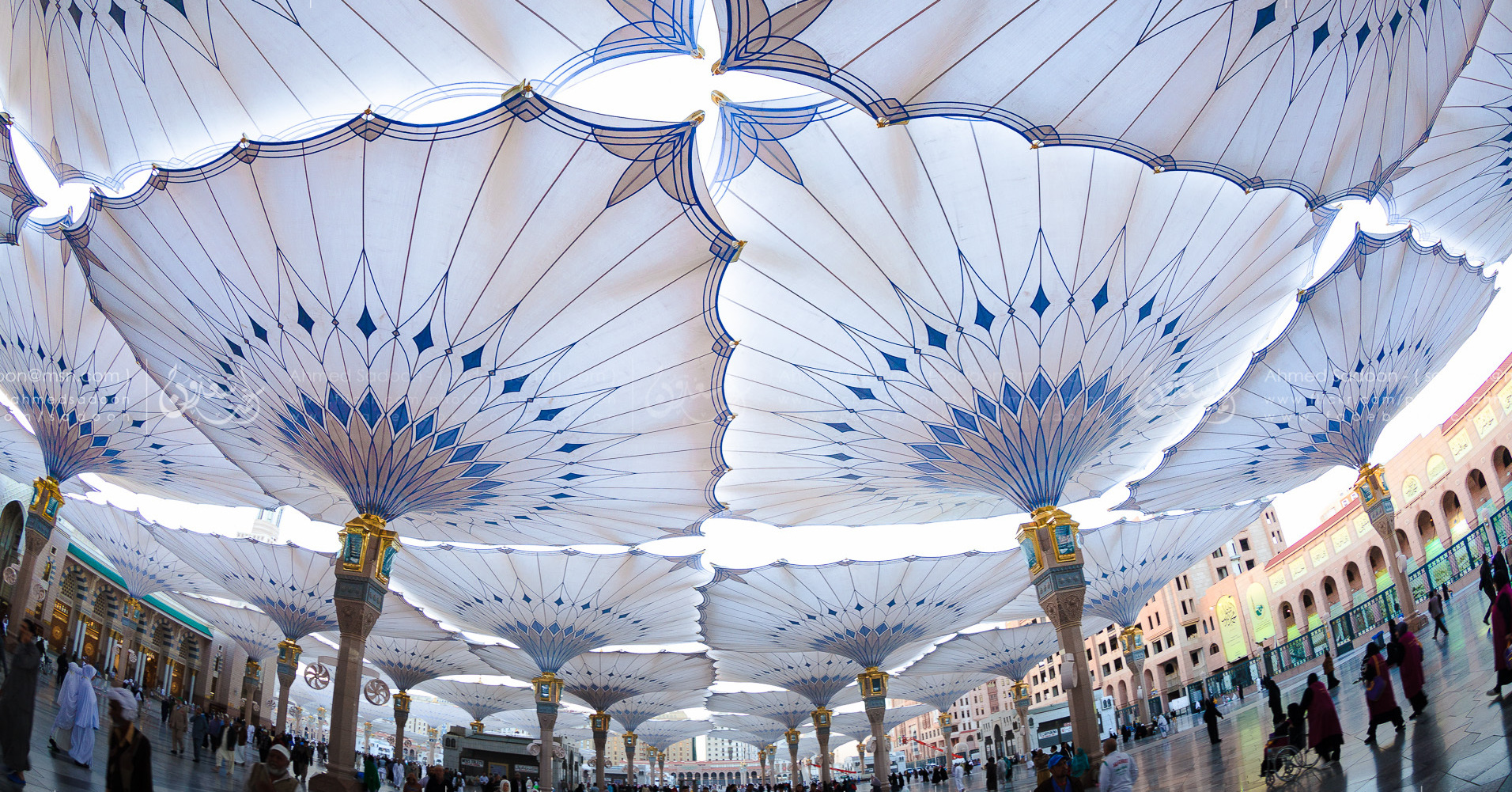
An underside view

Medina Haram Piazza Shading Umbrellas or Al-Masjid An-Nabawi Umbrellas are convertible umbrellas erected at the piazza of Al-Masjid an-Nabawi in Medina, Saudi Arabia. The shade of each umbrella is extended in the four corners, with a total area covered of 143,000 square meters. These umbrellas are aimed to protect worshipers from the heat of the sun during prayer, as well as from the risk of slipping and falling in the event of rain. Similar structures are built at the square of the mosques worldwide. At Al-Masjid An-Nabawi, there are a total of 250 umbrellas.

== Project ==
The concept was originally created by the King Abdullah bin Abdul Aziz, who ordered the construction of umbrellas for the squares of the mosque, which was overseen by the Custodian of the Two Holy Mosques. The project, completed in August 2010, initially involved the construction of 182 umbrellas aligning the pillars of the mosques at the square; later 68 umbrellas were added in the eastern square for a total of 250. The project cost was 4.7 billion riyals.

== Design ==
The Saudi Binladin Group has contracted the project's structural planning with the German architectural company Liebherr. From the beginning of the planning, the PTFE fabric was needed to meet the exceptional requirements, as any other fabric does not provide full protection from ultraviolet. The fabric is characterized by high tensile strength, wind strength, and its elasticity, chromatic stability, fire resistance, effective shading and suitable light penetration. The highly durable PTFE white fabric was developed by SEFAR Architecture specifically for the project. The shade is painted in white color due to the intensity of light, and because strong permeability can dazzle people under the umbrella, a sandy texture was chosen instead. In addition, the underside of the umbrellas was decorated with oriental motifs made of blue PTFE stripes.

=== Use of composites ===
Each single open umbrella structure of 25 by 25 metres (82 ft × 82 ft) spans an area of 625 square metres (6,730 sq ft). As the components for each umbrella are large and also have to withstand potentially extreme climatic conditions, the cladding needed to be made from advanced composites. Premier Composite Technologies LLC was commissioned to build and install the mosaic tiled, external claddings for all 250 units of foldable umbrellas. The arm claddings and cladding attachments were built from a lightweight composite sandwich structure of glass fibre epoxy resin laminate, providing high torsional stiffness. They were then fixed to the flexible umbrella arm systems. When closed, the arms cover the membrane while additional claddings on top of the arms form a prismatic casing to protect the folded Teflon membrane.

== Similar examples around the world ==
- Al Hussein Mosque, Cairo, Egypt
- Baiturrahman Grand Mosque, Banda Aceh, Indonesia

== See also ==
- Fan vaulting
- Awning
- Passive cooling
- Kucheh
