= Anna-Joséphine Dufour-Onofrio =

Anna-Joséphine Dufour-Onofrio (1817–1901) was a French-Swiss businessperson.

She was the owner of the major Etamine manufacturing company, Dufour & Cie, from 1842, and developed it into an internationally important company.

She founded the Thal Hospital.

The Dufour & Cie was united with Thal et Zurich in 1907 and became the Sefar in 1995.
