= Prophet's Mosque =

Historic mosque in Medina, Saudi Arabia

- Al-Masjid Al-Nabawī (ٱلْمَسْجِد ٱلنَّبَوِي)
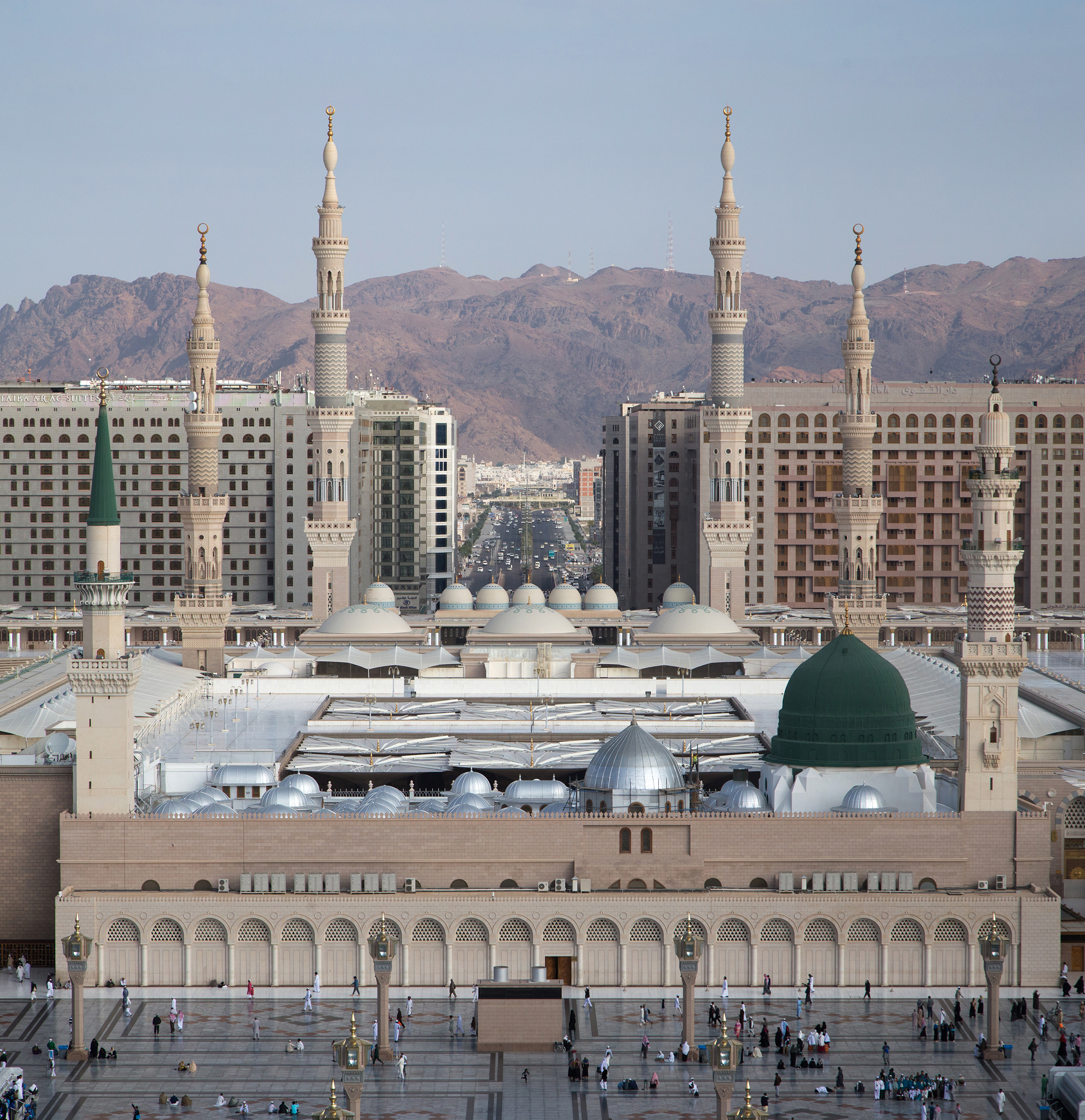
- The mosque from the south with the Green Dome visible to the right

- Location in Saudi Arabia

Religion
- Affiliation: Islam
- Ecclesiastical or organisational status: Mosque
- Leadership: Abdul-Rahman Al-Sudais (President of the Affairs of the Two Holy Mosques); Ali ibn Abdur-Rahman al Hudhaify (Chief Imam); Abdul Rahman Khashugji (Chief Mu'athin)
- Status: Active
- Religious features: Green Dome

Location
- Location: Al-Haram, Al-Medinah 42311, Al-Hejaz
- Country: Present-day Saudi Arabia
- Administration: General Presidency of Haramain
- Coordinates: 24°28′6″N 39°36′39″E

Architecture
- Type: Mosque
- Style: Islamic architecture
- Founder: Muhammad
- Established: 622

Specifications
- Capacity: 1,000,000 worshippers
- Dome: Many
- Minaret: 10
- Minaret height: 105 m (344 ft)
- Inscriptions: Verses from the Quran and the names of Allah and Muhammad

Website
- wmn.gov.sa

The Prophet's Mosque (Arabic: ٱلْمَسْجِد ٱلنَّبَوِي, romanized: al-Masjid al-Nabawī, lit. 'Mosque of the Prophet') is the second mosque built by the Islamic prophet Muhammad in Medina, after the Quba Mosque, as well as the second largest mosque and holiest site in Islam, after the Masjid al-Haram in Mecca, in the Saudi region of the Hejaz. The mosque is located at the heart of Medina, and is a major site of pilgrimage that falls under the purview of the Custodian of the Two Holy Mosques.

Muhammad himself was involved in the construction of the mosque. At the time, the mosque's land belonged to two young orphans, Sahl and Suhayl, and when they learned that Muhammad wished to acquire their land to build a mosque, they went to Muhammad and offered the land to him as a gift; Muhammad insisted on paying a price for the land because they were orphaned children. The price agreed upon was paid by Abu Ayyub al-Ansari, who thus became the endower or donor (Arabic: وَاقِف, romanized: wāqif) of the mosque, on behalf or in favor of Muhammad.

Originally an open-air building, the mosque served as a community center, a court of law, and a religious school. It contained a raised platform or pulpit (minbar) for the people who taught the Quran and for Muhammad to give the Friday sermon (khutbah). Subsequent Islamic rulers greatly expanded and decorated the mosque, naming its walls, doors and minarets after themselves and their forefathers. After an expansion during the reign of the Umayyad caliph al-Walid I (r. 705–715), it now incorporates the final resting place of Muhammad and the first two Rashidun caliphs Abu Bakr (r. 632–634) and Umar (r. 634–644). One of the most notable features of the site is the Green Dome in the south-east corner of the mosque, which was built above the site of the former house of Aisha, where the graves of Muhammad, Abu Bakr and Omar are located.

In 1909, under the reign of Ottoman Sultan Abdul Hamid II, it became the first place in the Arabian Peninsula to be provided with electrical lights. From the 14th century, the mosque was guarded by eunuchs, the last remaining guardians were photographed at the request of then-Prince Faisal bin Salman Al Saud, and in 2015, only five were left. It is generally open regardless of date or time, and has only been closed to visitors once in modern times, as Ramadan approached during the COVID-19 pandemic in 2020.

== History ==
=== Under Muhammad and the Rashidun (622–660) ===
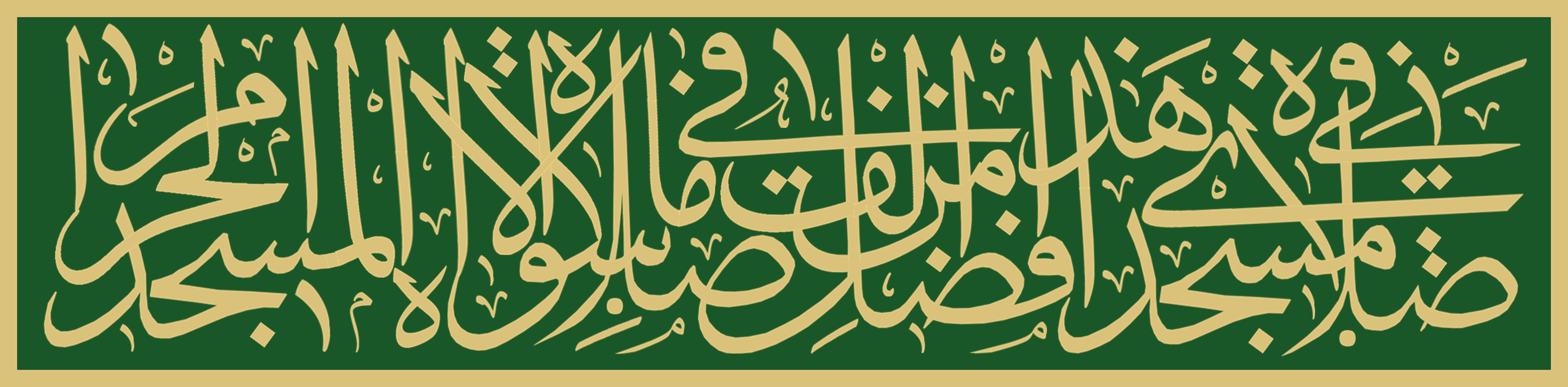
A hadith inscribed in the mosque which says "A prayer in this mosque of mine is better than a thousand prayers anywhere else, except for Al-Masjid al-Haram."

The mosque was built by Muhammad in 622 after his arrival in Medina. Riding a camel called Qaswa, he arrived at the place where this mosque was built, which was being used as a burial ground. Refusing to accept the land as a gift from the two orphans, Sahl and Suhayl, who owned the land, he bought the land which was paid for by Abu Ayyub al-Ansari, and it took seven months to complete the construction of the mosque. It measured 30.5 m × 35.62 m (100.1 ft × 116.9 ft). The roof which was supported by palm trunks was made of beaten clay and palm leaves. It was at a height of 3.60 m (11.8 ft). The three doors of the mosque were the Bāb ar-Raḥmah (بَاب ٱلرَّحْمَة, "Gate of the Mercy") to the south, Bāb Jibrīl (بَاب جِبْرِيْل, "Gate of Gabriel") to the west, and Bāb an-Nisāʾ (بَاب ٱلنِّسَاء, "Gate of the Women") to the east. At this time point in the history of the mosque, the wall of the qibla was facing north to Jerusalem, and the Suffah was along the northern wall. In the year 7 AH, after the Battle of Khaybar, the mosque was expanded to 47.32 m (155.2 ft) on each side, and three rows of columns were built beside the west wall, which became the place of praying. The mosque remained unaltered during the reign of Abu Bakr.

A plan that illustrates the building when it was built in 622 CE (1 AH), and before switching the Qibla towards Mecca in 623 CE (2 AH)

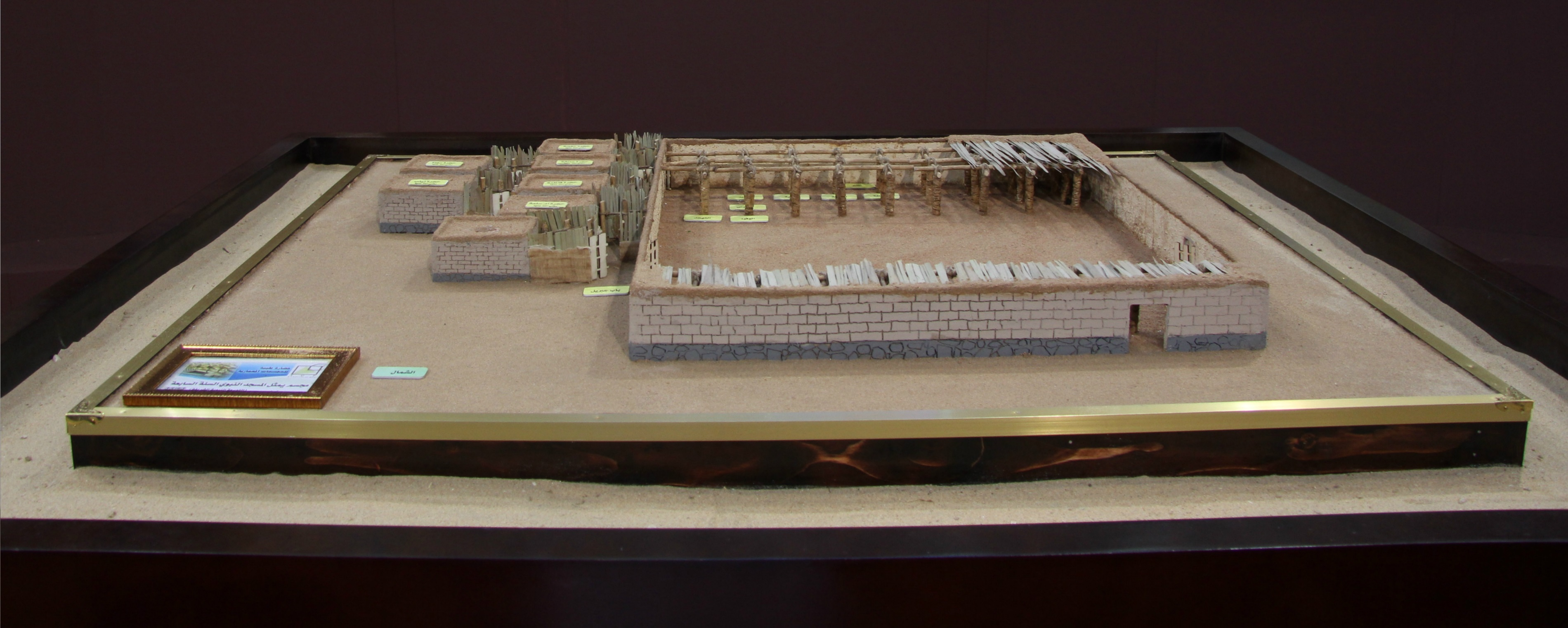
A miniature of the mosque in 628 CE (7 AH) after the first expansion

Umar demolished all the houses around the mosque, except those of Muhammad's wives, to expand it. The new mosque's dimensions became 57.49 m × 66.14 m (188.6 ft × 217.0 ft). Sun-dried mud bricks were used to construct the walls of the enclosure. Besides strewing pebbles on the floor, the roof's height was increased to 5.6 m (18 ft). Umar constructed three more gates for entrance. He also added Al-Buṭayḥah (ٱلْبُطَيْحَة) for people to recite poetry.

The third Rashidun caliph Uthman demolished the mosque in 649. Ten months were spent in building the new rectangular shaped mosque whose face was turned towards the Kaaba in Mecca. The new mosque measured 81.40 m × 62.58 m (267.1 ft × 205.3 ft). The number of gates as well as their names remained the same. The enclosure was made of stones laid in mortar. The palm trunk columns were replaced by stone columns which were joined by iron clamps. Teakwood was used in reconstructing the ceiling filza.

=== Umayyad era ===
In 706 or 707, the Umayyad caliph al-Walid I (r. 705–715) instructed his governor of Medina, the future caliph Umar ibn Abd al-Aziz, to significantly enlarge the mosque and carried out the fourth and most monumental expansion of the mosque. According to the architectural historian Robert Hillenbrand, the building of a large scale mosque in Medina, the original center of the caliphate, was an "acknowledgement" by al-Walid of "his own roots and those of Islam itself" and possibly an attempt to appease Medinan resentment at the loss of the city's political importance to Syria under the Umayyads.

It took three years for the work to be completed. Raw materials were procured from the Byzantine Empire. Al-Walid lavished large sums for the mosque's reconstruction and supplied mosaics and Greek and Coptic craftsmen. The area of the mosque was increased from the area 5,094 square metres (54,830 ft^{2}) of Uthman's time, to 8,672 square metres (93,340 ft^{2}). For the first time, porticoes were built in the mosque connecting the northern part of the structure to the sanctuary. The reconstruction preserved the location of the qibla wall (in the direction of prayer), but Umar ordered the addition of a curved niche to it and this became the first concave mihrab in Islamic architecture. The renovated mosque was richly decorated with marble paneling and mosaics covering its walls. Later written accounts, such as that of Ibn Jubayr (1184), described the mosaics as containing inscriptions and depicting landscapes with trees, suggesting that they resembled the style of contemporary Umayyad mosaics in the Dome of the Rock in Jerusalem and the Great Mosque of Damascus.

The mosque's redevelopment entailed the demolition of the living quarters of Muhammad's wives and the expansion of the structure to incorporate the graves of Muhammad, Abu Bakr and Umar. The vocal opposition to the demolition of Muhammad's home from local religious circles was dismissed by al-Walid. A wall was built to segregate the mosque and the houses of the wives of Muhammad. The mosque was reconstructed in a trapezoid shape with the length of the longer side being 101.76 metres (333.9 ft).

According to the 10th-century writer Ibn Rusta, minarets were also built for the first time during al-Walid's expansion as four towers were added to the mosque's corners. They may be the first minarets in Islamic architecture, though it is not clear exactly what purpose these towers served in this early period. At the time of Ibn Rusta's writing, only one of the original four towers remained standing. The southwest minaret was demolished in 716 on the orders of Sulayman ibn Abd al-Malik.

=== Abbasid era ===
The Abbasid caliph al-Mahdi (r. 775–785) extended the mosque to the north by 2,450 square metres (26,400 sq ft), the fifth expansion of the mosque which took four years to complete. His name was also inscribed on the walls of the mosque. He also planned to remove six steps to the minbar, but abandoned this idea, fearing damage to the wooden platforms on which they were built. The project required the demolition of the two northern minarets of al-Walid's time but they were replaced by two new towers at the northern corners of the new expansion. According to an inscription of Ibn Qutaybah, the caliph al-Ma'mun (r. 813–833) did "unspecified work" on the mosque. Al-Mutawakkil (r. 847–861) lined the enclosure of Muhammad's tomb with marble. In 1257–58 Al-Musta'sim wanted to carry out a renovations program of the mosque but the renovation was interrupted by the Mongol sack of Baghdad in 1258.

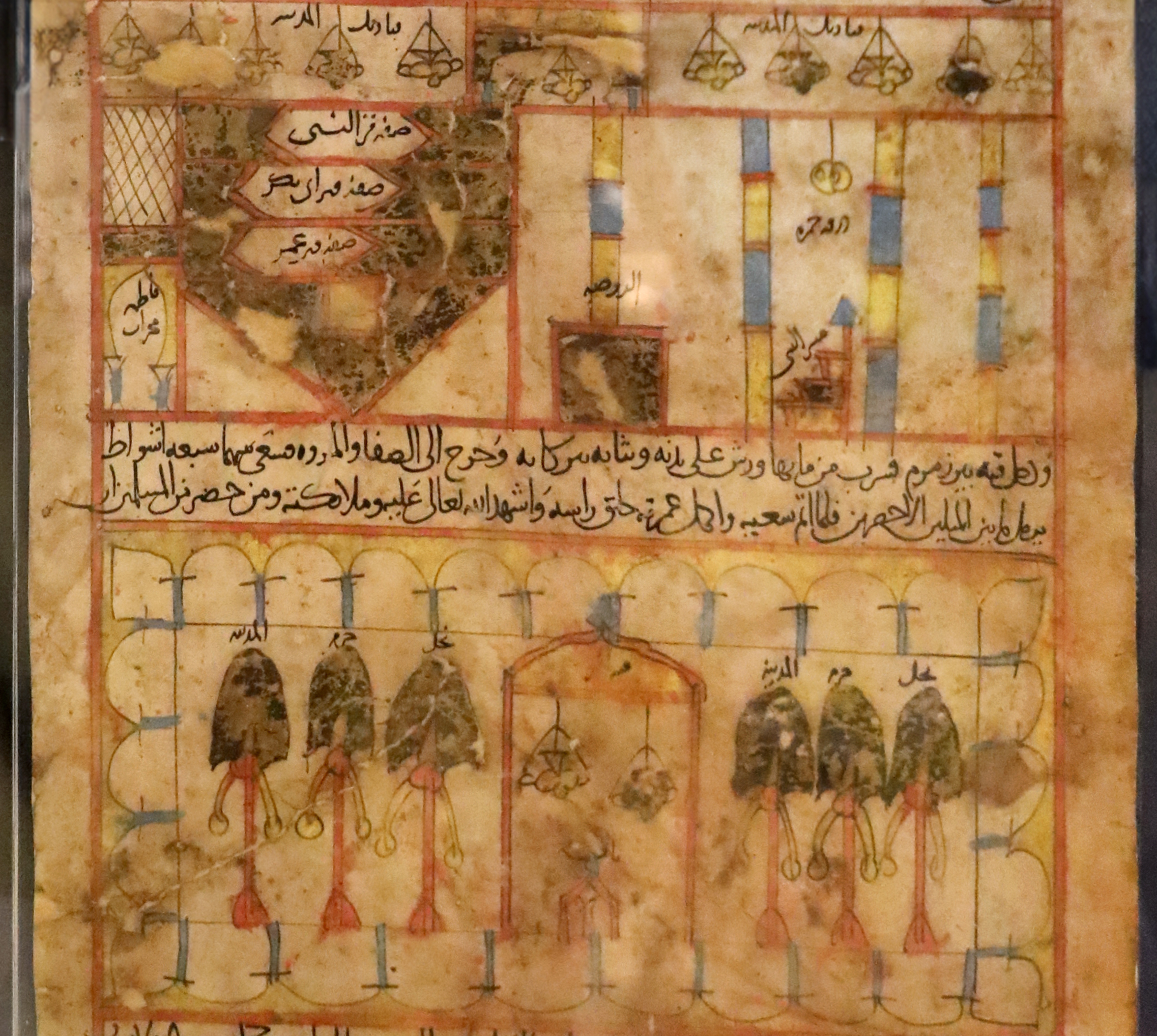
Oldest depiction of the mosque, from an Ayyubid Hajj Certificate, 1205–06

1	Pentagonal Tomb Chamber of the Prophet, Abu Bakr and Umar
2	Mihrab Fatima
3	al-Rawda with coloured marble columns
4	Minbar
5	Hanging lamps
6	Outer arcaded courtyard with Palm trees
7	The dome of oils (Qubbat al-Zayt) - used for storing wax and oil for lighting

=== Mamluk era ===
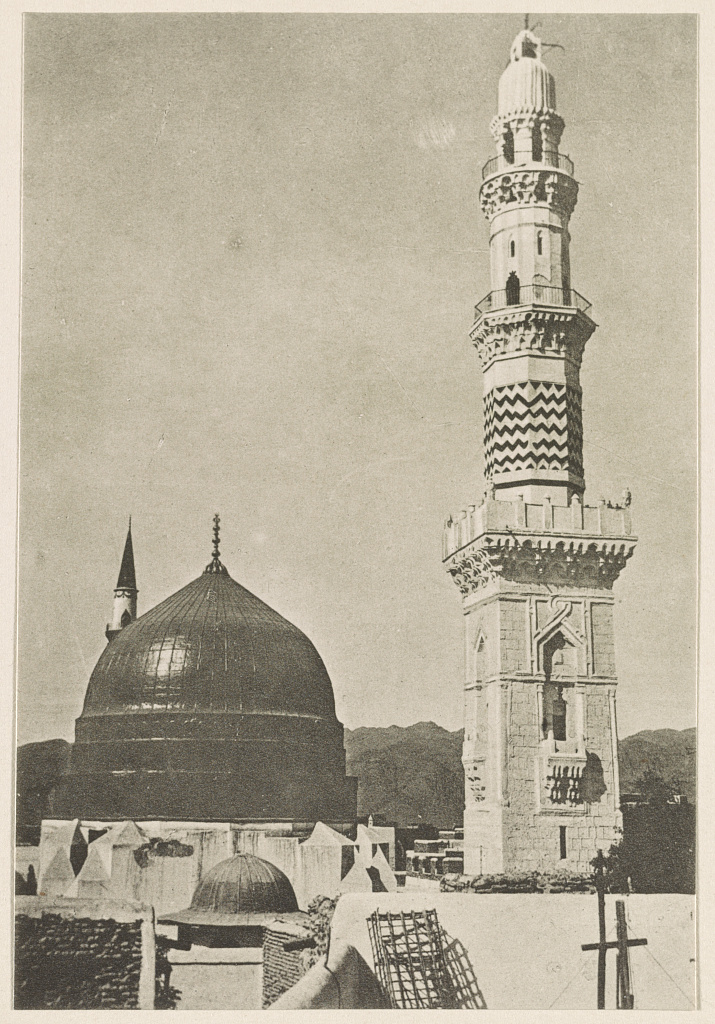
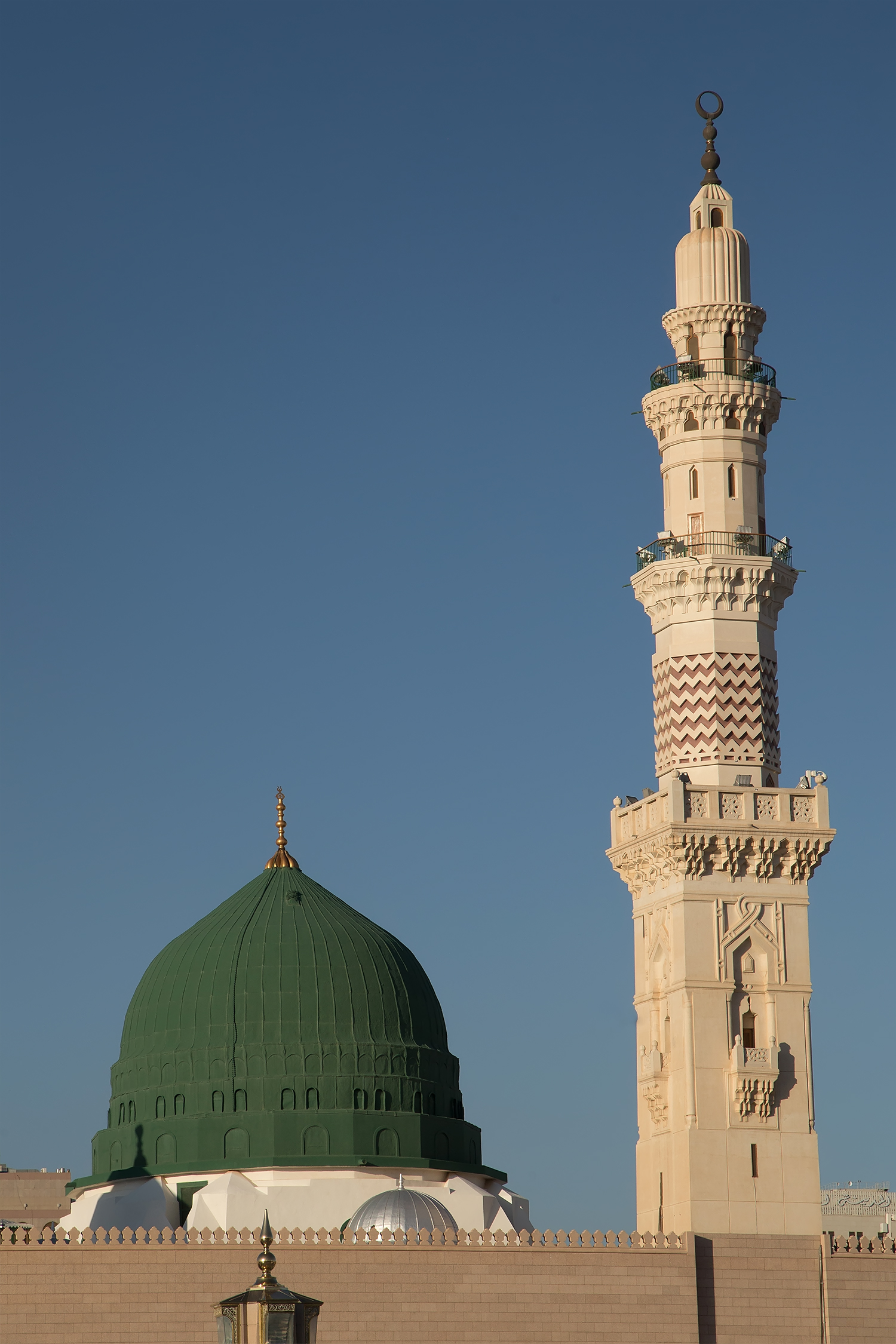
The Raisiyyah Minaret was built by Qaitbay in 1481 (886 AH). The Green Dome was originally built by Qalawun but was later rebuilt and painted green in 1837. Images in 1910 (left), and 2018 (right). The Green Dome is a defining symbol of the mosque.

In 1269, the Mamluk sultan Baybars sent dozens of artisans led by the eunuch Emir Jamal al-Din Muhsin al-Salihi to rebuild the sanctuary, including enclosures around the tombs of Muhammad and of Fatima. in 1279 sultan Qalawun added a wooden dome over the tomb of the prophet, and rebuilt the south-western minaret (Bab Al-Salam minaret) in 1307, which still retains its lower structure but with the upper section being built during the Ottoman era.

In 1474 the Mamluk sultan Qaitbay ordered major renovation to be conducted on the mosque's roofs, columns, walls and minarets, the work also included the rebuilding of the wooden dome to a stone dome over the prophet's tomb in 1476. and in 1481–1483 he carried out the sixth expansion of the mosque, and ordered the reconstruction of the Nabawi mihrab, Uthmani Mirhab and the Tahajjud Mihrab. In addition, he rebuilt the south-eastern Raisiyyah Minaret (main minaret) in 1481. It was subsequently renovated in 1483 and again in 1486. He also commissioned the construction of the Western Minaret, which was later demolished during the Saudi expansions.

=== Ottoman era ===
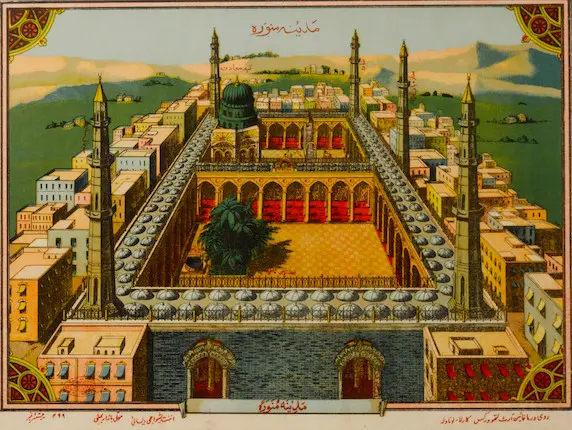
An illustration of the mosque in 1910

Sultan Suleiman I (r. 1520–1566) rebuilt the east and west walls of the mosque, and rebuilt the northeastern minaret known as Sulaymaniyya. He added a new altar called Ahnaf next to Muhammad's altar, Shafi'iyya, and placed a new steel-covered dome on the tomb of Muhammad. Sultan Suleiman I wrote the names of the Ottoman sultans from Osman I (r. 1299–1324) to himself (Kanuni) and revived the "Gate of Mercy" (Bab al-Rahma) or the west gate. The pulpit that is used today was built under Sultan Murad III (r. 1574–1595).

Following the Emirate of Diriyah’s conquest of Medina from Ottoman rule under Saud bin Abdulaziz (1805–1813), his followers demolished nearly every tomb and dome in Medina to prevent their veneration, except for the dome over Muhammad's tomb. According to their interpretation of Islam, they considered the veneration of tombs and places, which were thought to possess supernatural powers, as an offence against tawhid, and an act of shirk. Muhammad's tomb was stripped of its gold and jewel ornaments, but the dome was preserved either because of an unsuccessful attempt to demolish its complex and hardened structure, or because some time ago, Muhammad ibn Abd al-Wahhab, founder of the Wahhabi movement, wrote that he did not wish to see the dome destroyed.

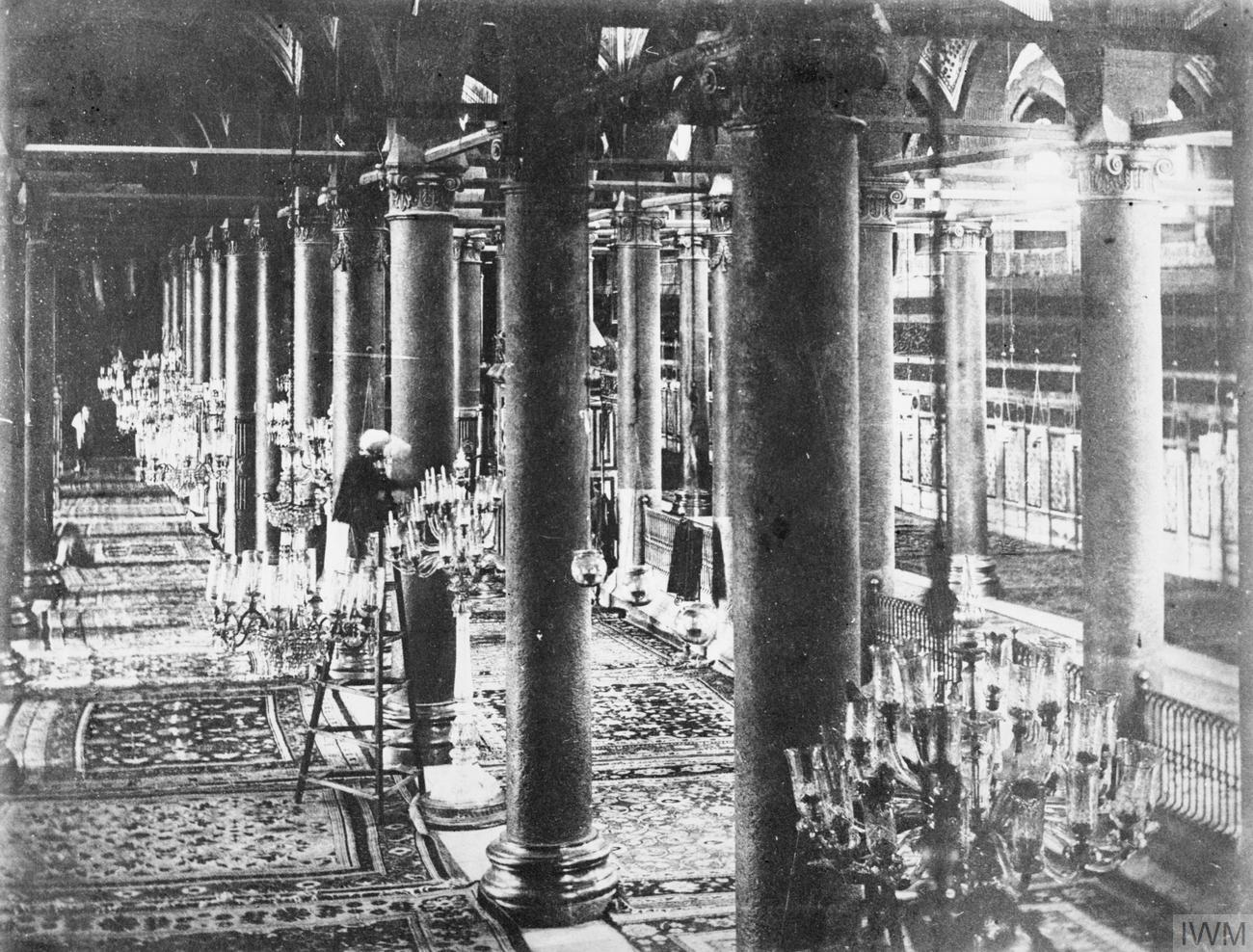
The interior of the mosque in 1916–1918

In 1817, Sultan Mahmud II (r. 1808–1839) completed the reconstruction of Al-Rawḍah Al-Sharīfah (Arabic: ٱلرَّوْضَة ٱلشَّرِيْفَة, lit. 'The Noble Garden') on the southeast side of the mosque, and reconsturcted its dome. The dome was painted green in 1837, and has been known as the "Green Dome" ever since. Sultan Mahmud II's successor, Sultan Abdulmejid I (r. 1839–1861), carried out the seventh expansion of the mosque, and it took thirteen years to rebuild the mosque, beginning in 1849. Red stone bricks were used as the main material in reconstruction of the mosque. The floor area of the mosque was increased by 1,293 square metres (13,920 ft^{2}).

On the walls, verses from the Quran were inscribed in Islamic calligraphy. On the northern side of the mosque, a madrasah was built for teaching the Qur'an. An ablution site was added to the north side. The prayer place on the south side was doubled in width, and covered with small domes. The interiors of the domes were decorated with verses from the Qur'an and couplets from the poem Qasīdat al-Burda. The qibli wall was covered with polished tiles with lines inscribed from the Qur'an. The places of prayer and courtyard were paved with marble and red stone. Following Fakhri Pasha's arrest by his own officers having resisted for 72 days after the end of the Siege of Medina on 10 January 1919, 400 years of Ottoman rule in the region came to an end.

=== Saudi rule and modern history (1925–present) ===
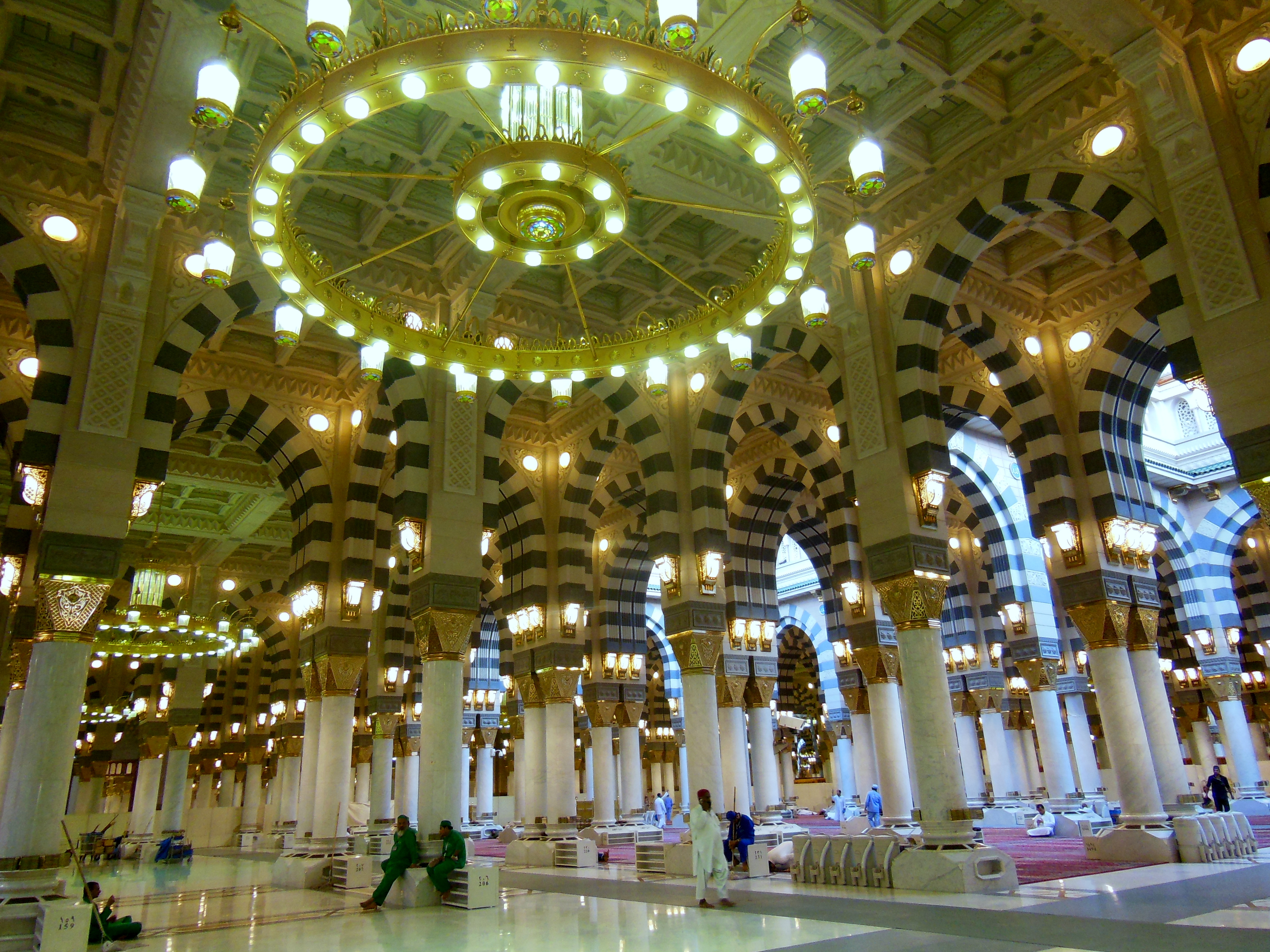
Interior of the Saudi expansion

After the foundation of the Kingdom of Saudi Arabia in 1932, the mosque underwent several major modifications. The eighth expansion of the mosque started in 1951, King Abdulaziz (1932–1953) ordered demolitions around the mosque to make way for new wings to the east and west of the prayer hall, which consisted of concrete columns with pointed arches. Older columns were reinforced with concrete and braced with copper rings at the top. The western, north-western and north-eastern minarets were replaced with two minarets in Mamluk revival style. The two minarets were erected to the northeast and northwest of the mosque. A library and a museum were also built along the western wall to house historic Qurans and other religious texts. In 1974, King Faisal added 40,440 m^{2} (435,300 sq ft) to the mosque.

The largest and most monumental expansion of the Prophet's Mosque took place during the reign of King Fahd, beginning in 1985. This major project required the demolition of numerous buildings surrounding the mosque to accommodate its growth. As part of the expansion, six new minarets were constructed, each reaching a height of 103.89 meters. An additional 27 inner courtyards were also added, each covering an area of 324 m^{2} (3,490 sq ft). Every courtyard was equipped with a movable dome that can be opened or closed depending on weather conditions, enhancing both comfort and functionality. The distinctive Ablaq pattern of the arches was preserved, maintaining continuity with the design established during the first Saudi expansion. The main Nabawi mihrab was also renovated as part of the project. Beneath the mosque, a lower level covering approximately 28,000 m^{2} (300,000 sq ft) was constructed to house essential infrastructure, including air-conditioning, water supply, warning and security systems, surveillance cameras, and remote-control equipment. In addition, an underground parking facility was built adjacent to the mosque. The expansion also included the construction of 15 service buildings around the outer courtyards, providing ablution facilities, restrooms, and drinking fountains to better accommodate the growing number of worshippers. In 1992, when it was completed, the mosque took over 160,000 m^{2} (1,700,000 sq ft) of space. Escalators were among the additions to the mosque.

In 2010, a major project was undertaken to install giant electrically operated retractable umbrellas across the outer courtyards of the Prophet's Mosque. A total of 250 umbrellas were erected, providing shade over approximately 143,000 square meters (1,540,000 square feet) of the mosque's surrounding courtyards. Designed to automatically open and close in response to weather conditions, the umbrellas significantly improved the comfort of worshippers by protecting them from the intense heat and direct sunlight while preserving the openness of the courtyards when not in use. A $6 billion project to increase the area of the mosque was announced in September 2012. After completion, the mosque should accommodate between 1.6 million to 2 million worshippers. In March of the following year, the Saudi Gazette reported that demolition work had been mostly complete, including the demolition of ten hotels on the eastern side, in addition to houses and other utilities.

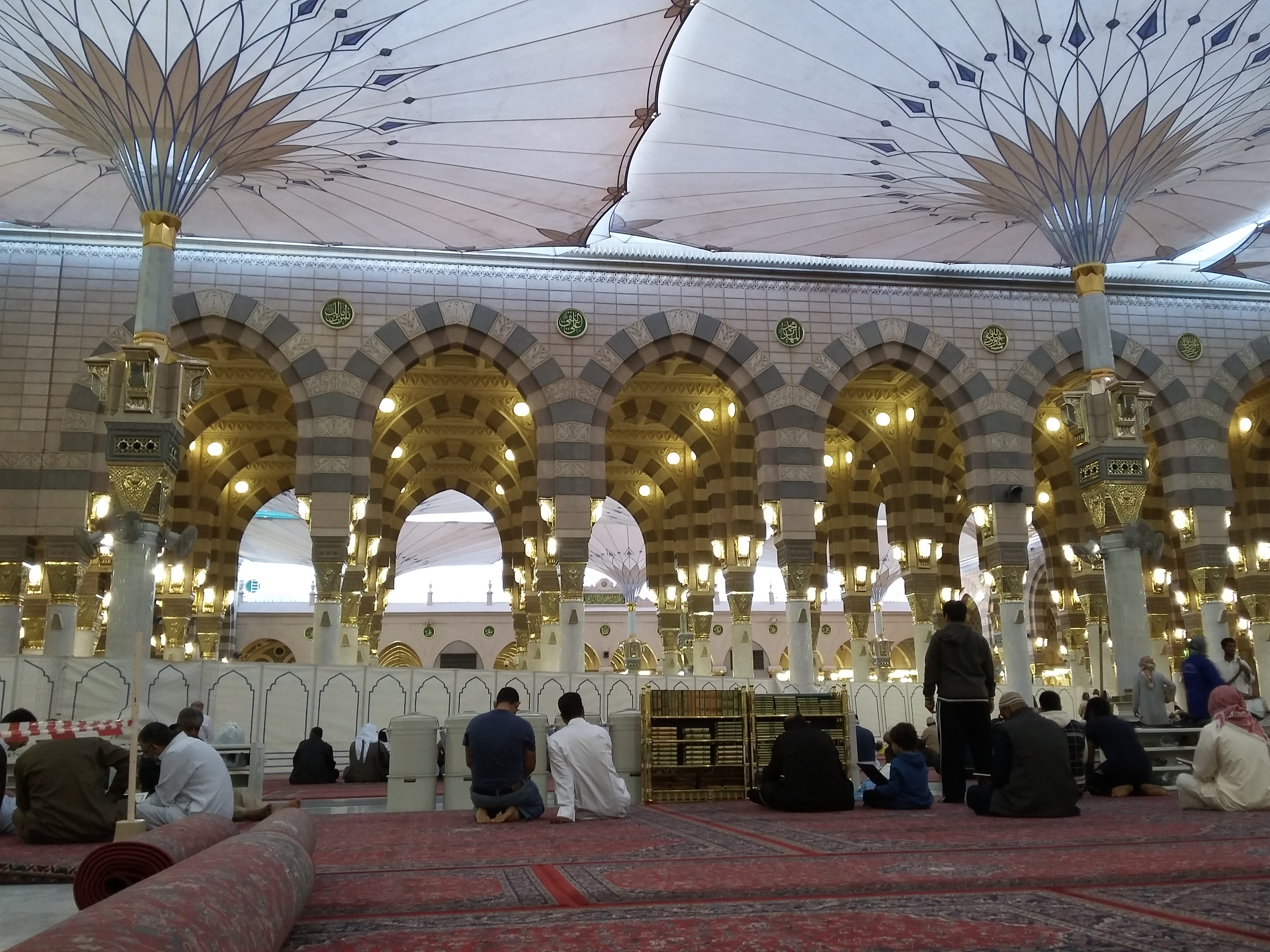
One of the two major Inner courtyards that include umbrellas

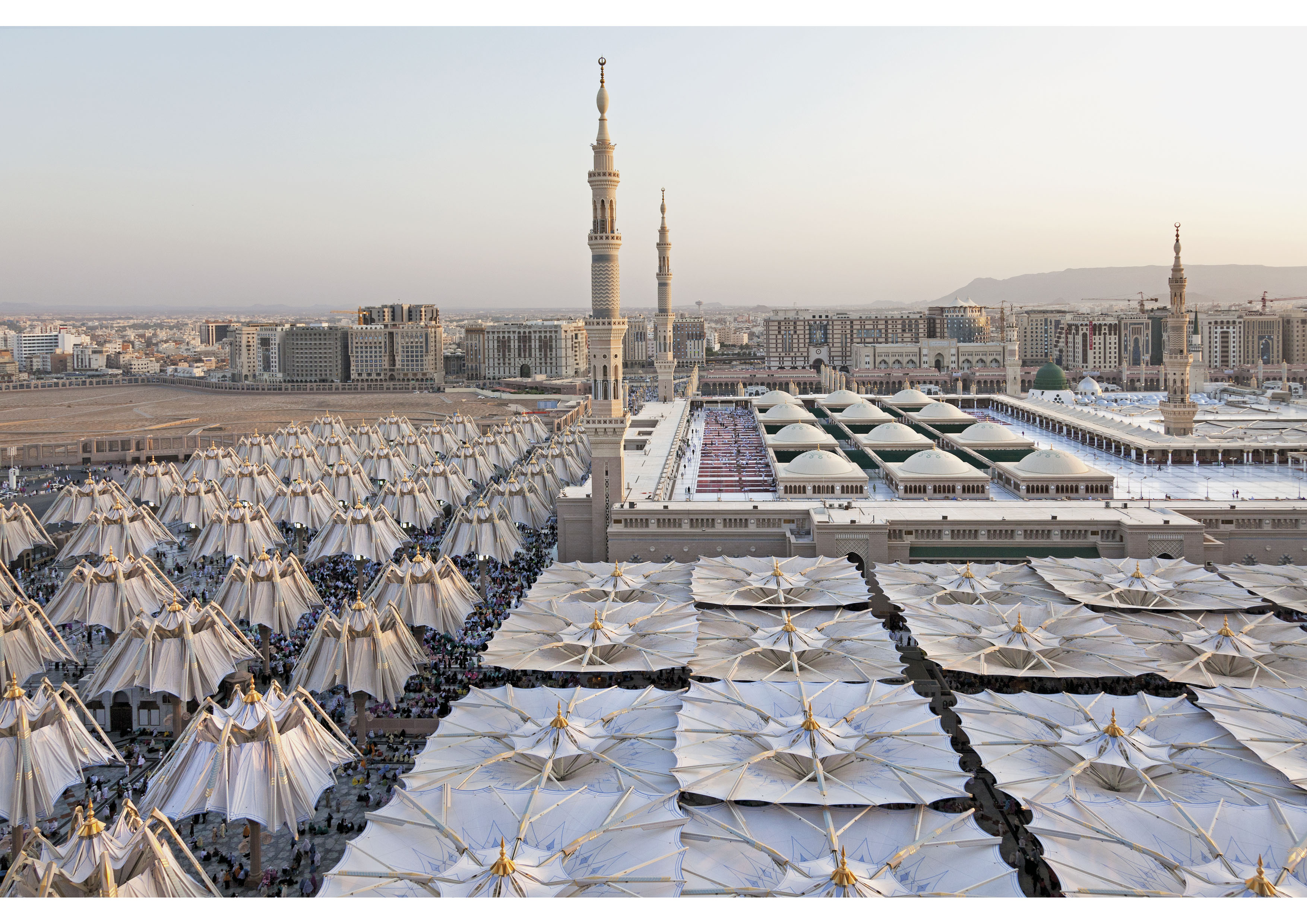
The umbrellas in the outer courtyard

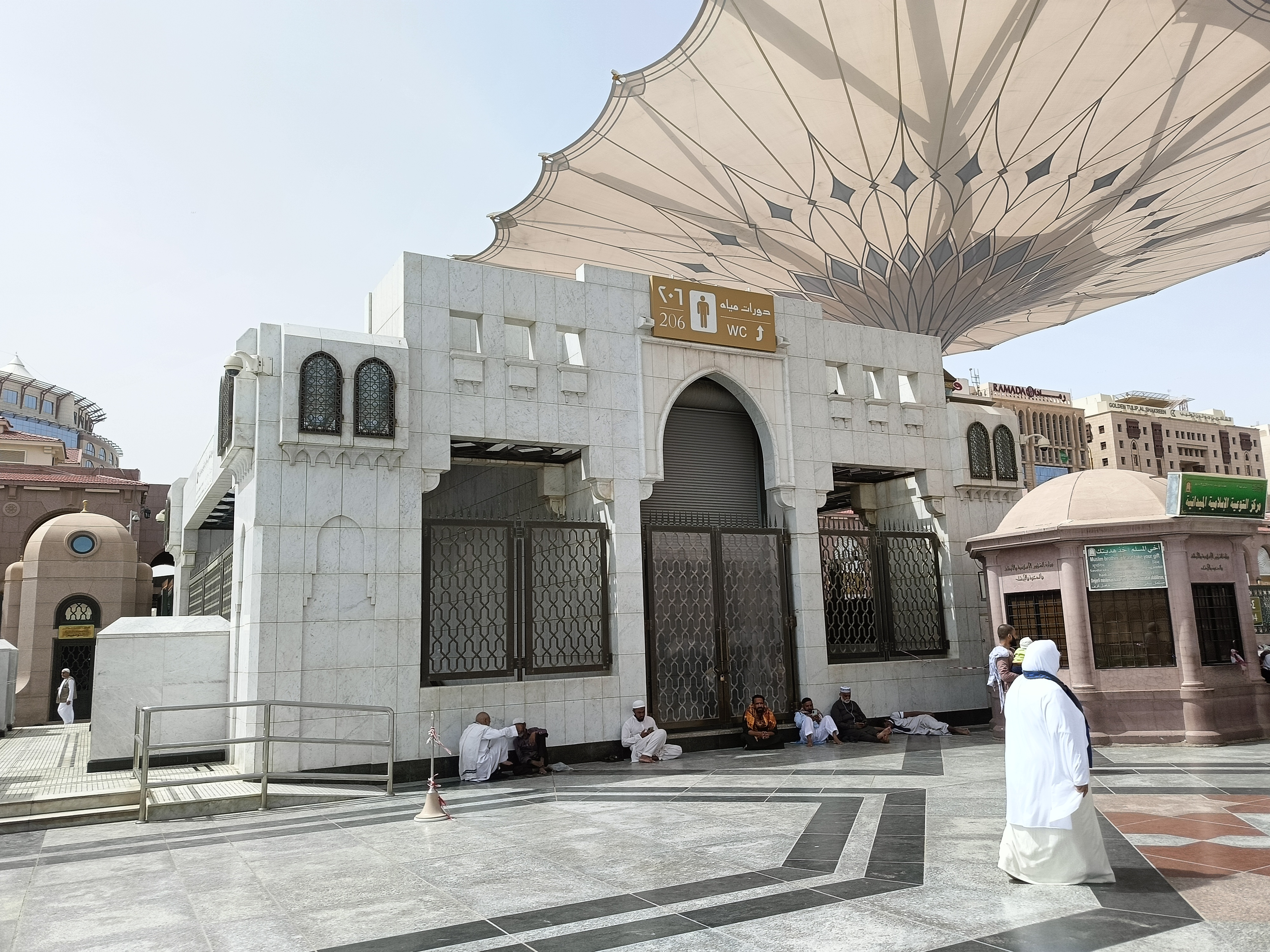
Service facilities in the outer courtyard

== Architecture ==
The modern-day mosque is situated on a rectangular plot and is two stories tall. The Ottoman prayer hall, which is the oldest part of the mosque, lies towards the south. It has a flat paved roof topped with 27 sliding domes on square bases. Holes pierced into the base of each dome illuminate the interior when the domes are closed. The sliding roof is closed during the afternoon prayer (Dhuhr) to protect the visitors. When the domes slide out on metal tracks to shade areas of the roof, they create light wells for the prayer hall. At these times, the courtyard of the Ottoman mosque is also shaded with umbrellas affixed to freestanding columns. The roof is accessed by stairs and escalators. The paved area around the mosque is also used for prayer, equipped with umbrella tents. The sliding domes and retractable umbrella-like canopies were designed by the German Muslim architect Mahmoud Bodo Rasch, his firm SL Rasch GmbH, and Buro Happold.

=== The Rawda ===
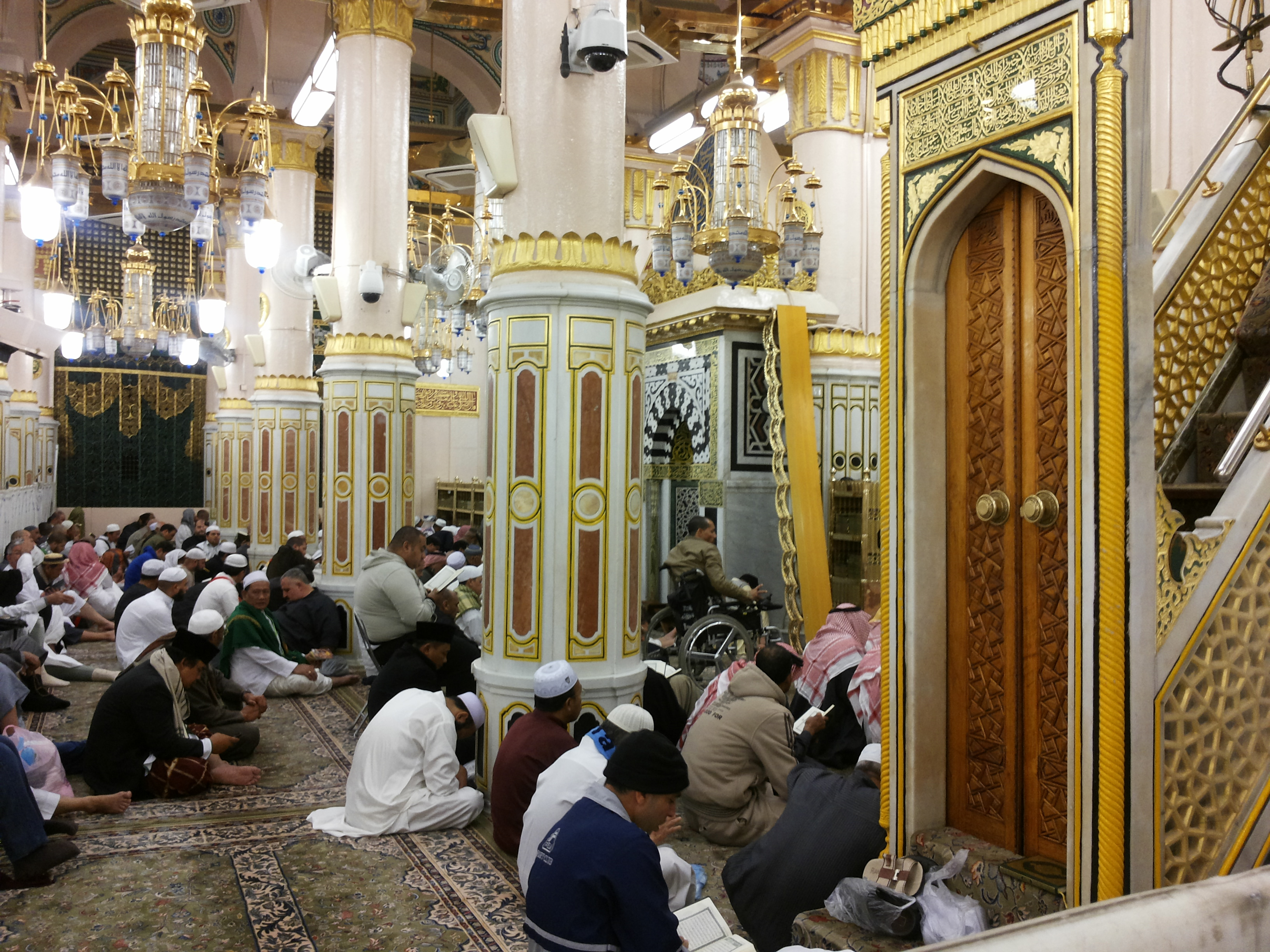
The area of Al-Rawda al-Sharifah is distinguished by a series of uniquely colored columns. It lies between the minbar on the right and the wall of the burial chamber (Al-Hujrah - formerly the Prophet’s house) visible in the background. Entry to the Rawda is regulated through timed permits, with access granted during designated visitation slots.

Al-Rawḍah Al-Sharīfah (Arabic: ٱلرَّوْضَة ٱلشَّرِيْفَة, lit. 'The Noble Garden') is an area between the minbar and the burial-chamber of Muhammad (under the Green Dome). It is regarded as one of the Riyāḍ al-Jannah (Arabic: رِيَاض ٱلْجَنَّة, lit. 'Gardens of the Paradise'). The area is distinguished by its marked columns and a green carpet, which historically contrasted with the red carpet used throughout the rest of the mosque. This distinction was eliminated when the carpeting throughout the mosque was later replaced with green. The Saudi Ministry of Hajj and Umrah lists the digital application Nusuk as the channel for booking appointments and issuing permits to visit Al-Rawda Al-Sharifah.

=== The Green Dome ===
The Sacred Prophetic Chamber adjacent to the Rawda holds the tombs of Muhammad and two of his companions and fathers-in-law, Abu Bakr and Umar. A fourth grave is reserved for ʿĪsā (Jesus), as Muslims believe that he will return and will be buried at the site. The site is covered by the Green Dome, which was originally built as a wooden dome by Mamluk sultan Qalawun in 1279 and then replaced by a stone dome by Mamluk sultan Qaitbay in 1467. It was replaced by a new dome again in 1817, during the reign of the Ottoman sultan Mahmud II. This version was built in brick, covered in lead, and painted green in 1837.

=== Mihrabs ===
In the early years of the mosque, there were two mihrabs, one was added by Muhammad (Nabawi Mihrab) and another was added after by Uthman (Uthmani Mihrab) after the expansion of the mosque in the qibla wall . The latter was larger than that of Muhammad's, and acted as the functional mihrab, whereas Muhammad's mihrab became a "commemorative" mihrab. The first concave mihrab niche was added to the qibla wall during the Umayyad renovation of the early 8th century. The plate behind the current Nabawi mihrab indicates that the mihrab was built in 1484 by the Mamluk sultan Qaitbay (r. 1468–1496).

The mosque also contains additional mihrabs that are no longer in use. The third mihrab, located to the west of the Nabawi Mihrab, is known as the Hanafi Mihrab. It was constructed by the Mamluk official Tughan Sheikh during the reign of Sultan Sayf al-Din Inal (r. 1453–1461) to accommodate prayers according to the Hanafi school of thought, although the people of Medina initially rejected the installation of a separate mihrab for a different school of thought. The Hanafi mihrab was later renovated by Suleiman the Magnificent and subsequently named after him (Sulaimani Mihrab), an inscription behind the mihrab states that the renovation took place in 908 AH (1502–1503 CE); however, this date is considered incorrect. The inscription’s author likely intended to write either 928 AH (1522 CE) or 938 AH (1532 CE). Other mihrabs that are not in use include the Tahajjud Mihrab which is currently covered, and the Fatima Mihrab in the burial chamber.

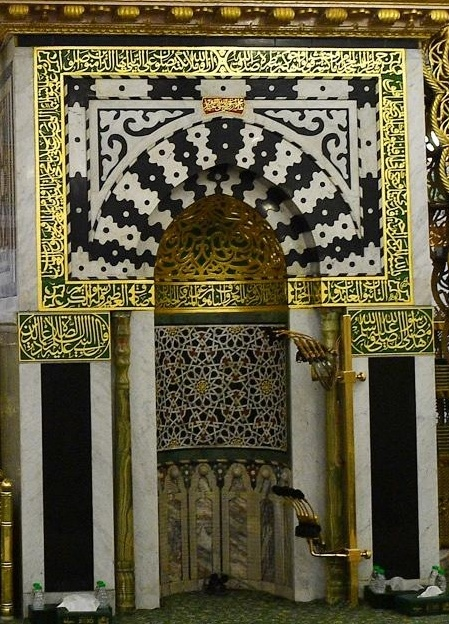
The Nabawi Mihrab (Prophet's Mihrab), the spot where Muhammad led prayers is identified with what is now a 19th-century mihrab of marble.

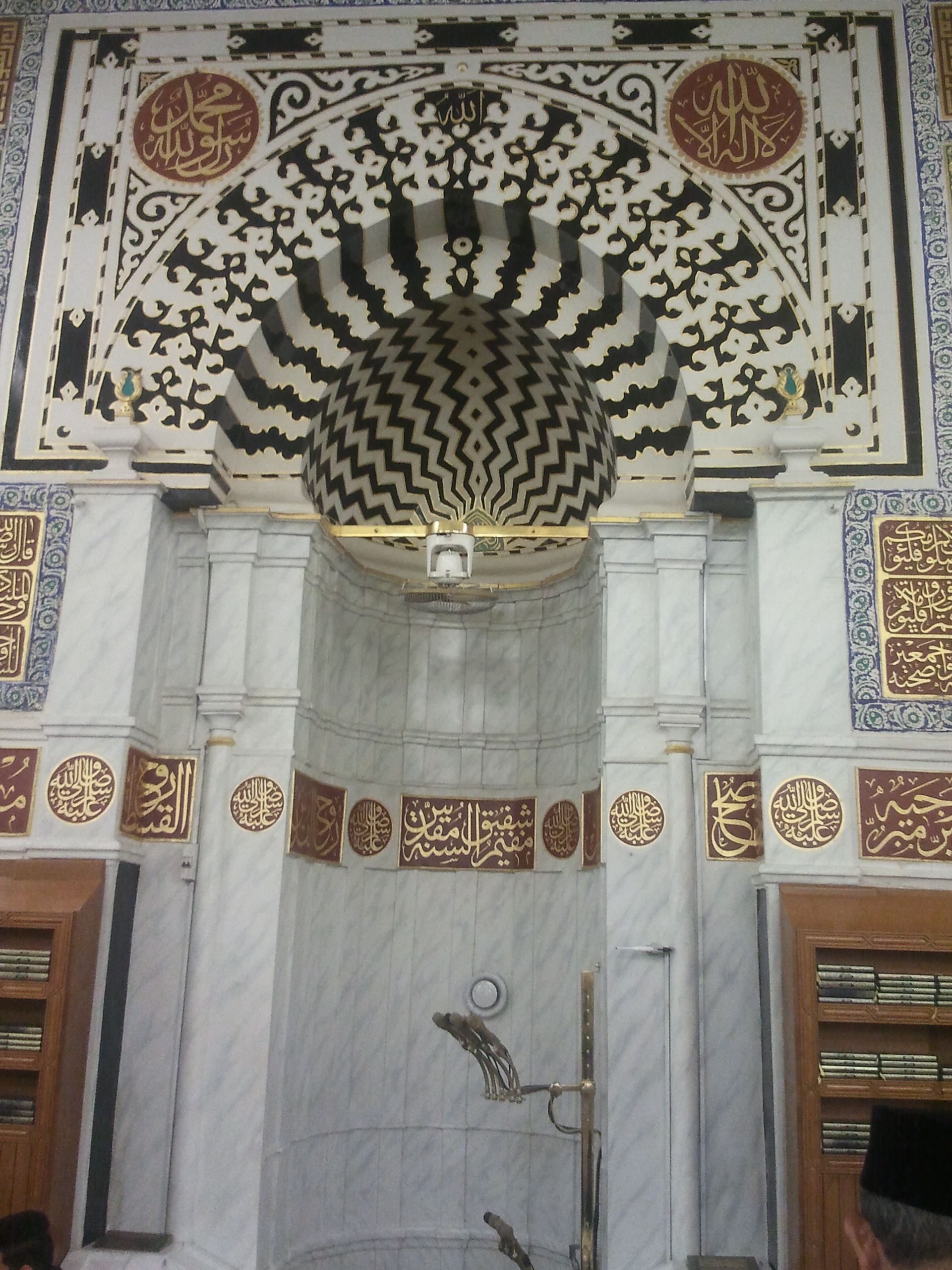
The Uthmani Mihrab

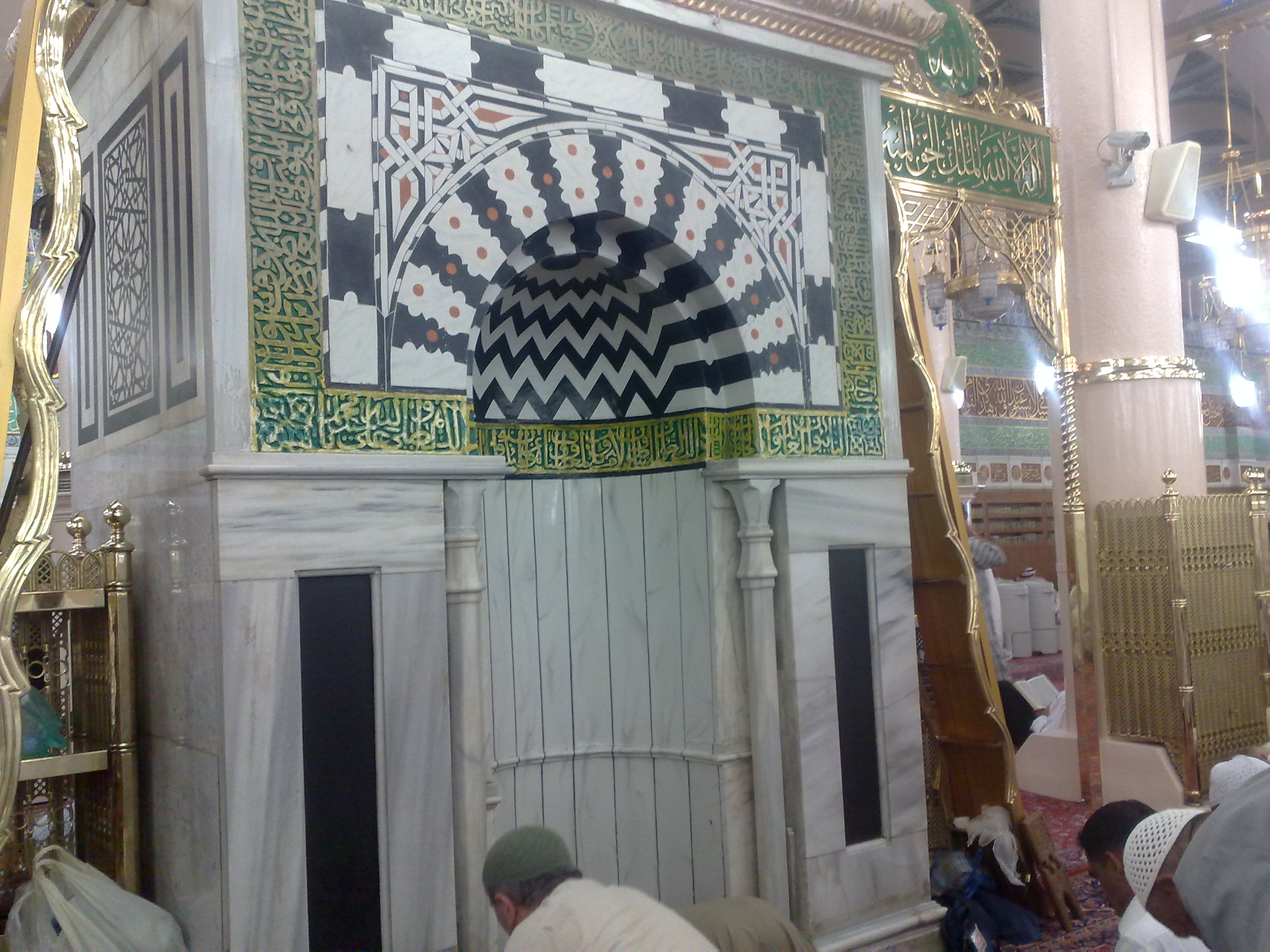
The Sulaimani Mihrab or the Hanafi Mihrab

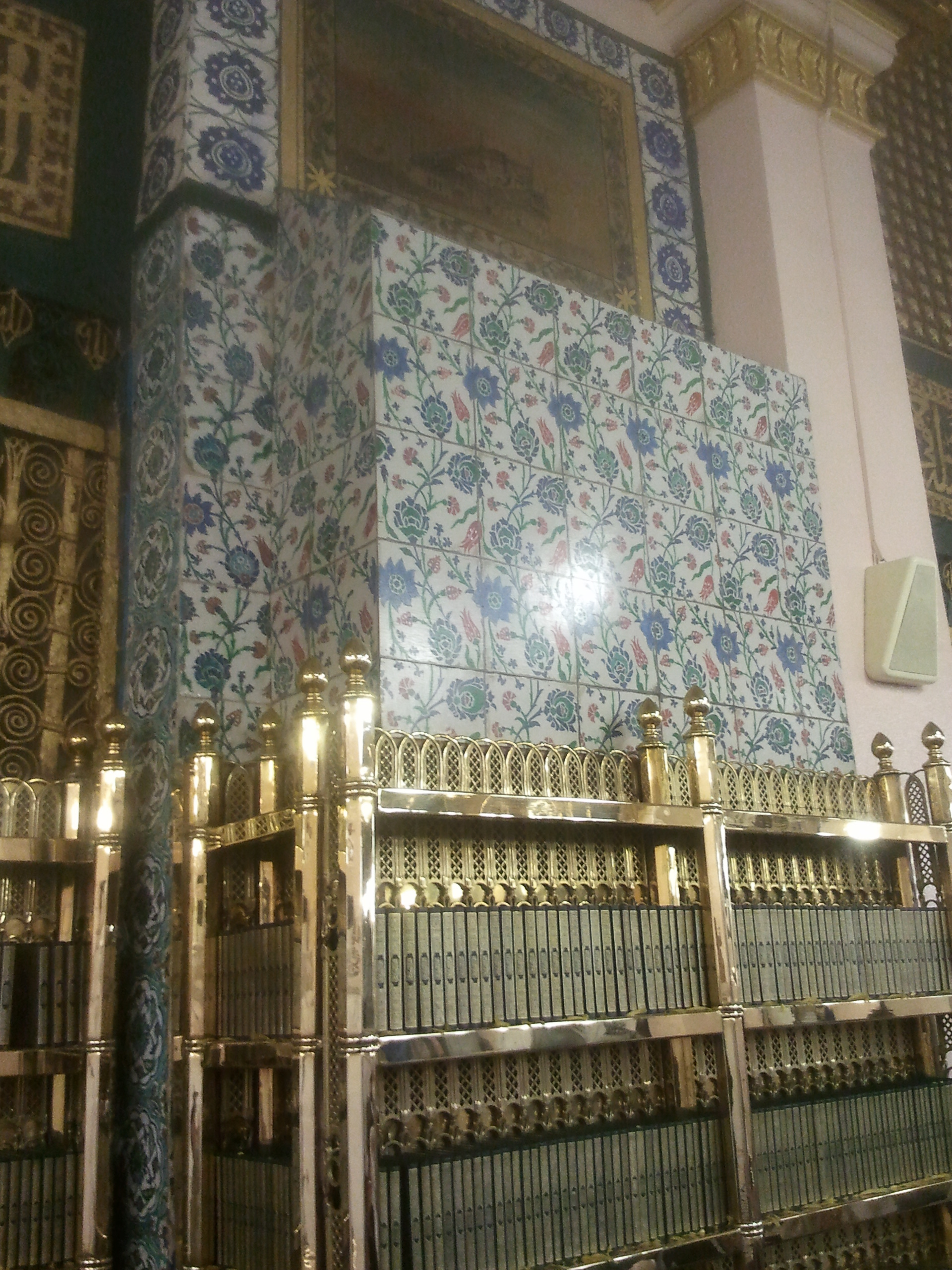
The sealed Tahajjud Mihrab

=== Minbars ===
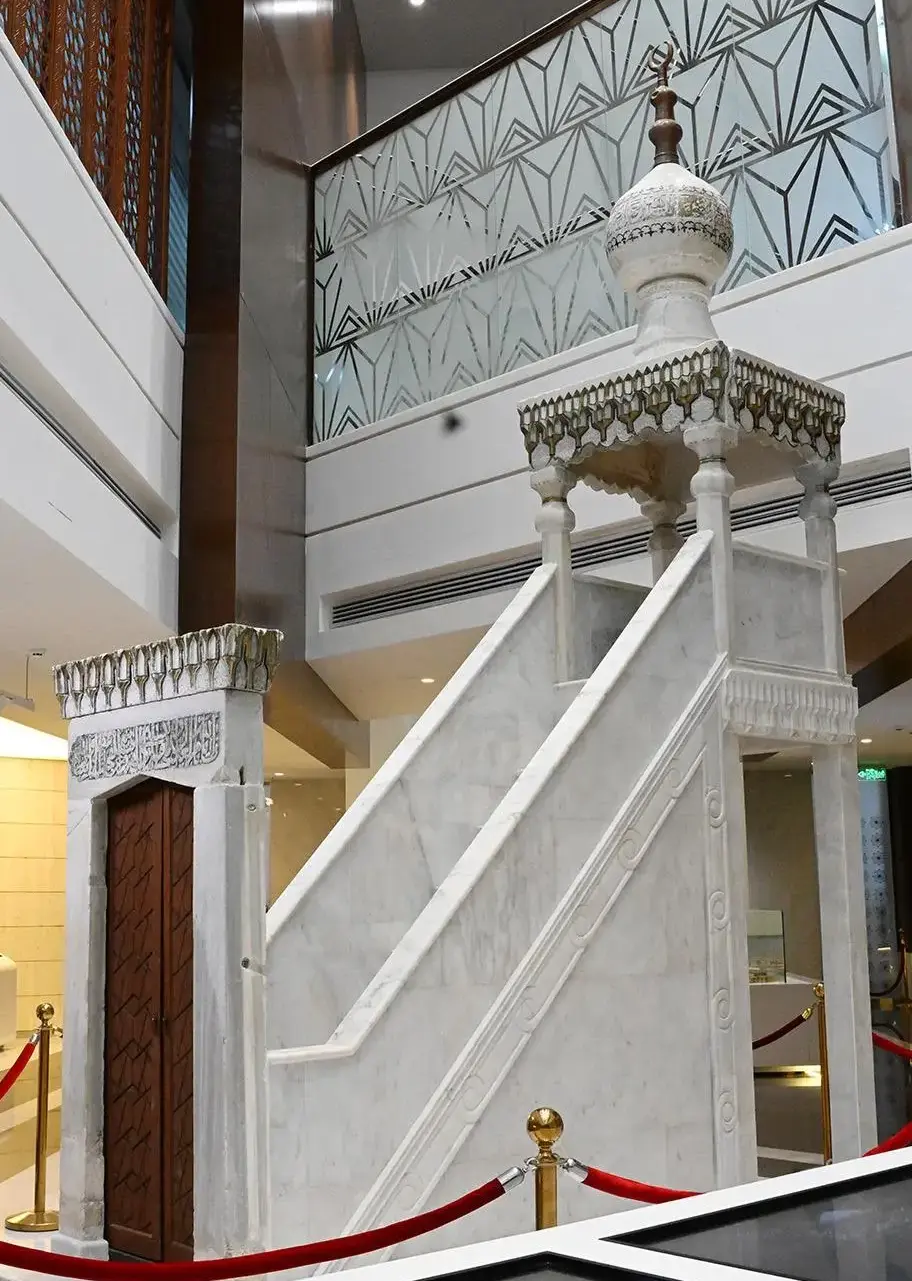
The mosque's previous minbar, commissioned by Qaitbay, was installed in 1483.

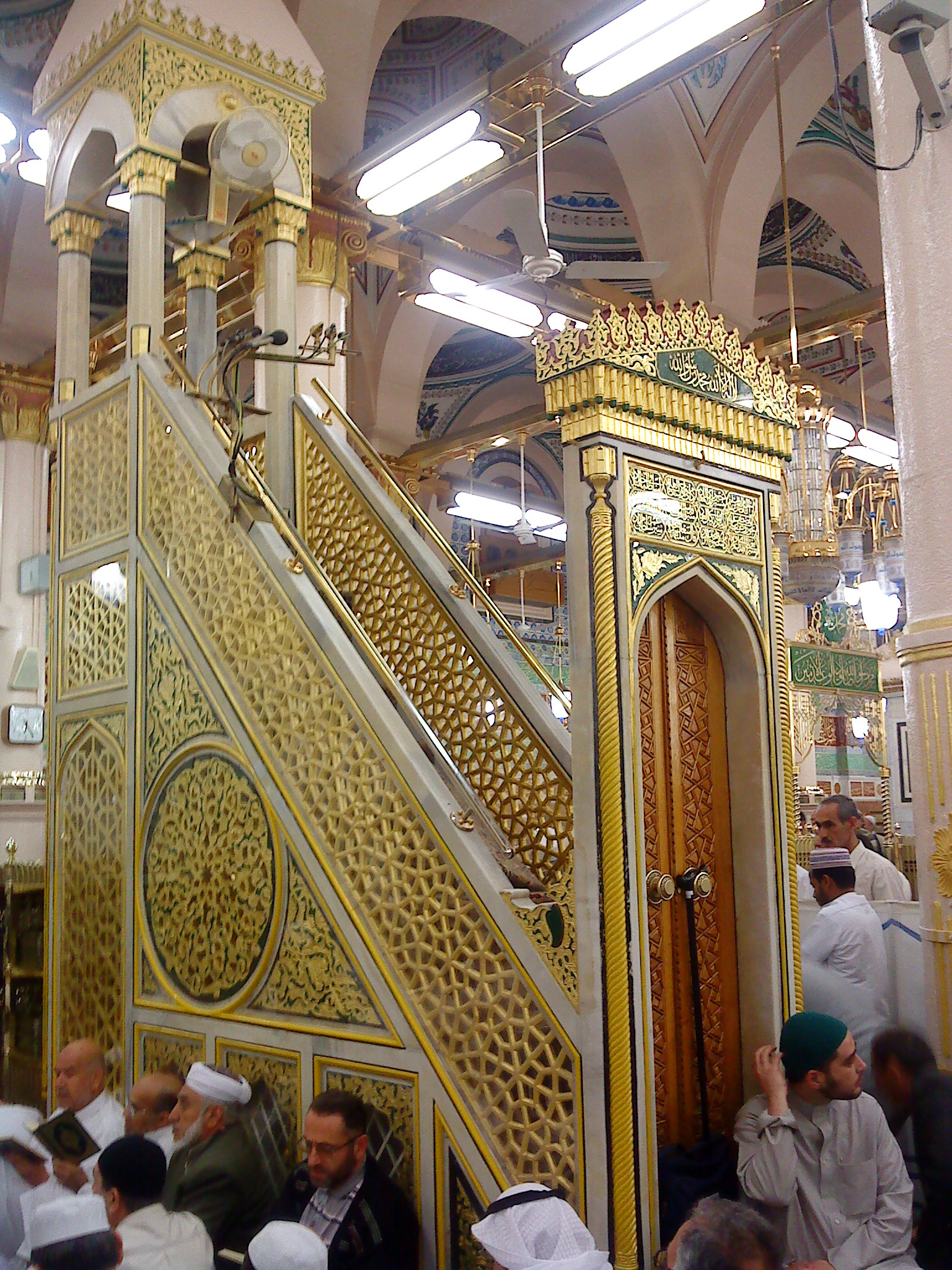
The current minbar commissioned by Sultan Murad III installed in 1590

The original minbar (مِنـۢبَر) used by Muhammad was a block of date palm wood. This was replaced by him with a tamarisk one, which had dimensions of 50 cm × 125 cm (20 in × 49 in). In 629, a three staired ladder was added to it. Abu Bakr and Umar did not use the third step as a sign of respect to Muhammad, but Uthman placed a fabric dome over it, and the rest of the stairs were covered with ebony.

According to al-Saffarini, during the caliphate of Muawiya I (r. 661–680), he ordered his governor of Medina, Marwan I, to raise the Prophet's minbar, increasing it to nine steps. After the original minbar was destroyed in the fire of 1256 CE (654 AH), the Abbasid Al-Musta'sim ordered that it be rebuilt. However, the Mongol sack of Baghdad interrupted the project before it could be completed. In response, the Sultan of Yemen Al-Muzaffar Yusuf I commissioned a new sandalwood minbar and sent it to Medina. This was later replaced by one presented by the Mamluk sultan Baybars in 1266 (664 AH), which remained in use until 1394 CE (797 AH), when Barquq sent another minbar. It was subsequently replaced by one commissioned by Al-Mu'ayyad Shaykh in 1417 CE (820 AH), which remained in the Prophet's Mosque until the fire of 1481 CE (886 AH). Following the fire, the people of Medina erected a temporary minbar until Qaitbay presented a white marble minbar in 1483 CE (888 AH). Finally, in 1590 CE (998 AH), the white marble minbar was replaced by another marble minbar commissioned by the Ottoman sultan Murad III, which became the mosque's permanent minbar. The minbar of Qaitbay was then moved to Quba Mosque, and then to King Abdulaziz Library in Medina, in 2018 it was renovated and moved to the Prophet’s Mosque Architecture Exhibition, situated to the south of the Prophet's Mosque.

=== Minarets ===
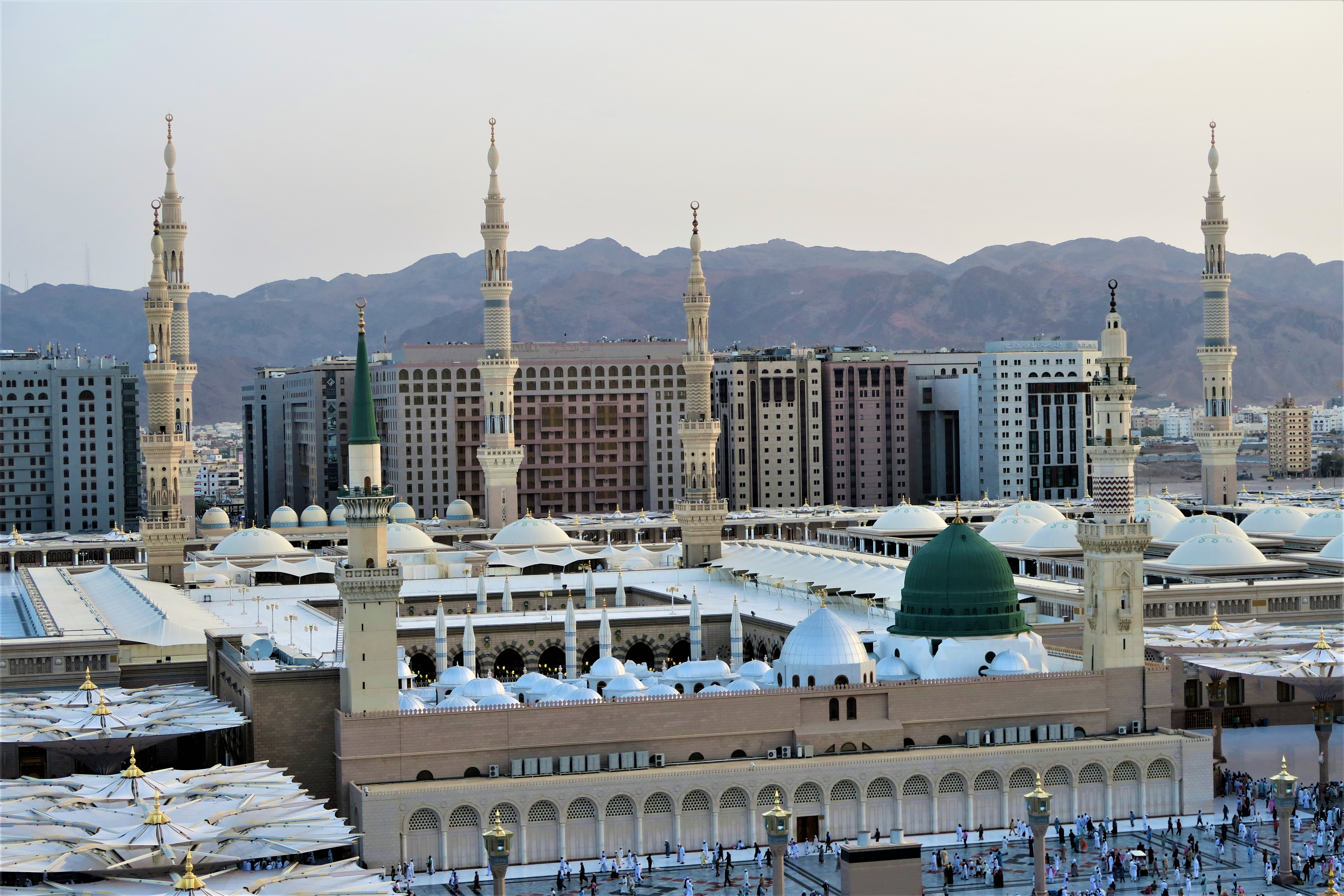
Bab al-Salam Minaret (foreground left), the Raisiyya Minaret next to the Green Dome (foreground right)

The earliest recorded minarets were square stone towers, numbering four, that were built at the four corners of the mosque during the Umayyad period, they were constructed during the reign of al-Walid I (r. 705–715), under the supervision of the governor of Medina, Umar ibn Abd al-aziz. The original minarets stood approximately 27.5 metres (90 ft) high with a base of 16 square metres (170 sq ft). The south-western minaret named Bab al-Salam minaret (مئذنة بَاب ٱلسَّلَام, Miʾḏanat Bāb al-Salām) was demolished by caliph Sulayman (r. 715–717), only four years after it was built, because it overlooked the house of Marwan ibn Al-Hakam, It was not rebuilt until 1307 by the Mamluk sultan al-Nasir Muhammad, restoring the number of minarets to four. The current Bab al-Salam minaret retains its Mamluk period lower structure, while its upper section was renovated during the Ottoman period.

The mosque's minarets underwent several phases of renovation and reconstruction. A fifth minaret, the western Bab al-Rahma Minaret (مئذنة بَاب الرحمة, Miʾḏanat Bāb al-Raḥma), was added in 1483–84 during the reign of the Mamluk Sultan Qaitbay (r. 1468–1496). During the same period, the south-eastern Raisiyyah ("Main") Minaret (المئذنة الرئيسية, al-Miʾḏana al-Raʾīsiyya), located beside the Green Dome, was rebuilt three times between 1481 and 1486, it has remained largely preserved in its original Mamluk architectural form to this day. By the time of the Ottoman expansion under Sultan Abdulmejid I (r. 1839–1861), the mosque had five minarets. Of these, only the Raisiyyah Minaret has retained its original Mamluk architectural style, while the other four were rebuilt in the Ottoman architectural style.

Of the five minarets, only two remain today. The south-eastern Raisiyyah ("Main") Minaret (المئذنة الرئيسية), and the south-western Bab al-Salam minaret (مئذنة بَاب ٱلسَّلَام), The remaining three were demolished and replaced during the Saudi expansions of the mosque. During the first Saudi expansion (1952–1955), two new minarets were constructed at the northern end of the mosque, one on the eastern side and the other on the western side. During the second Saudi expansion (1985–1994), six additional minarets, each rising to 103.89 metres (340.8 ft), were added, bringing the mosque's total number of minarets to ten.

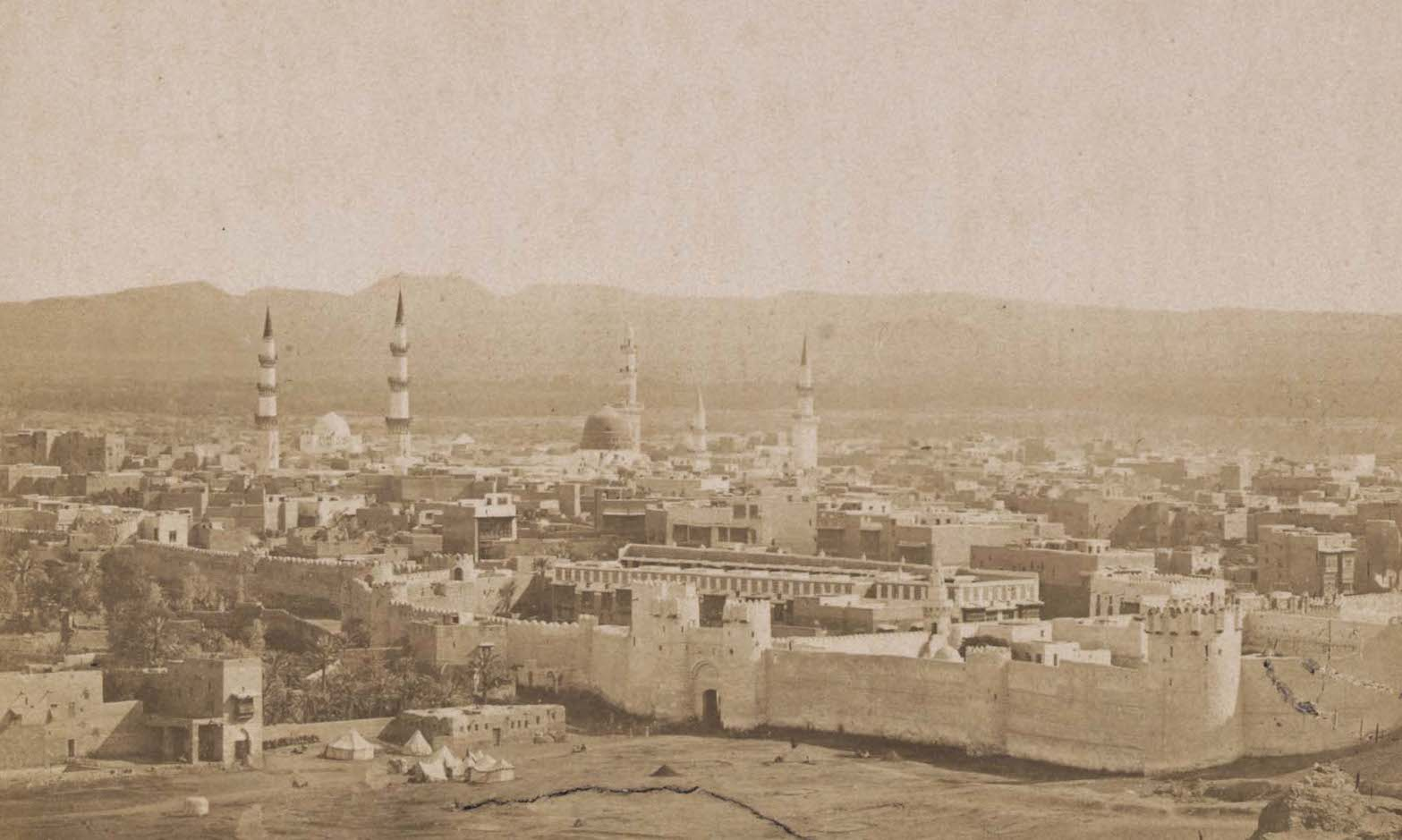
The five minarets, as seen in 1880 before the Saudi expansions

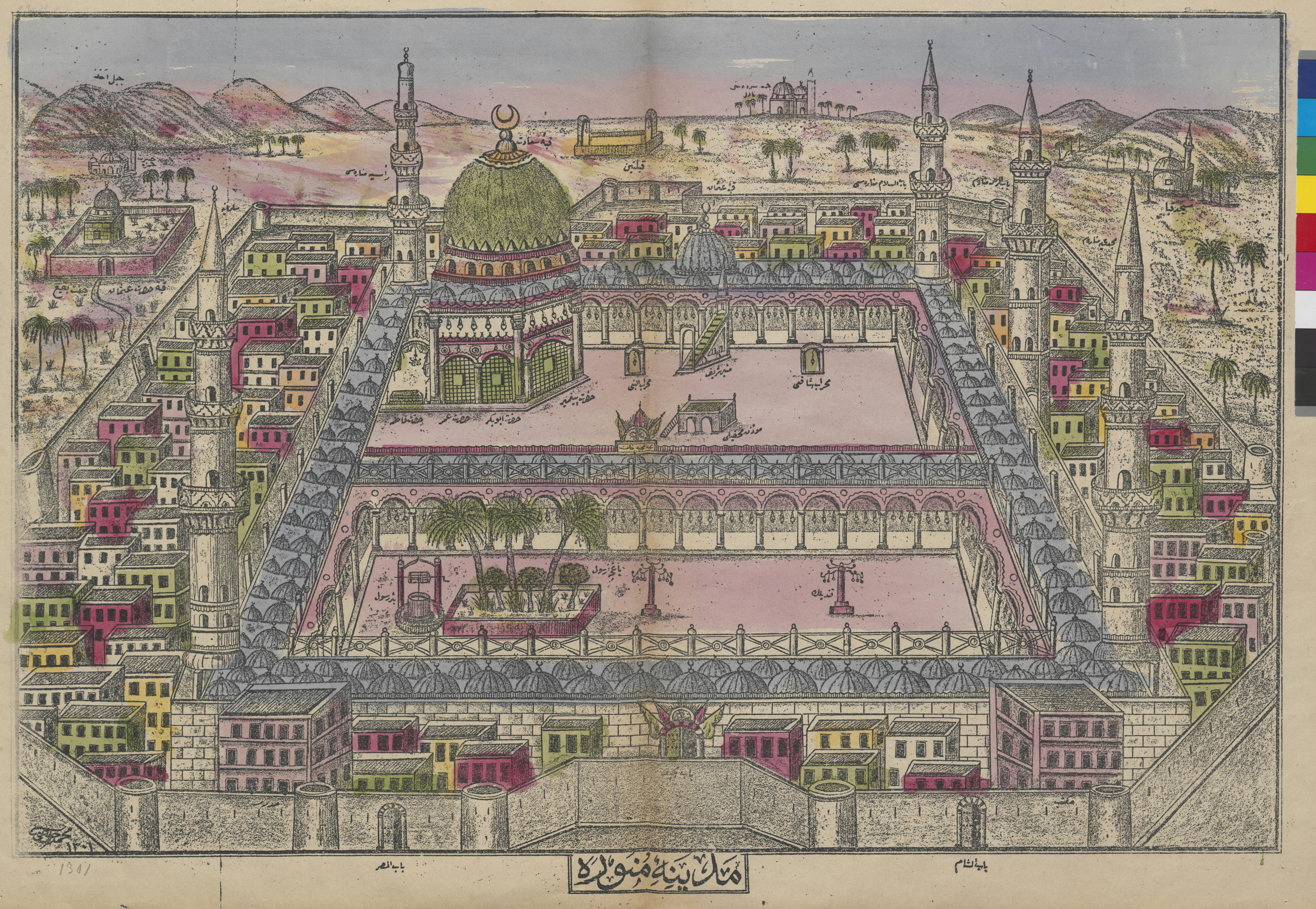
An 1883 illustration of the mosque as it appeared with its five minarets

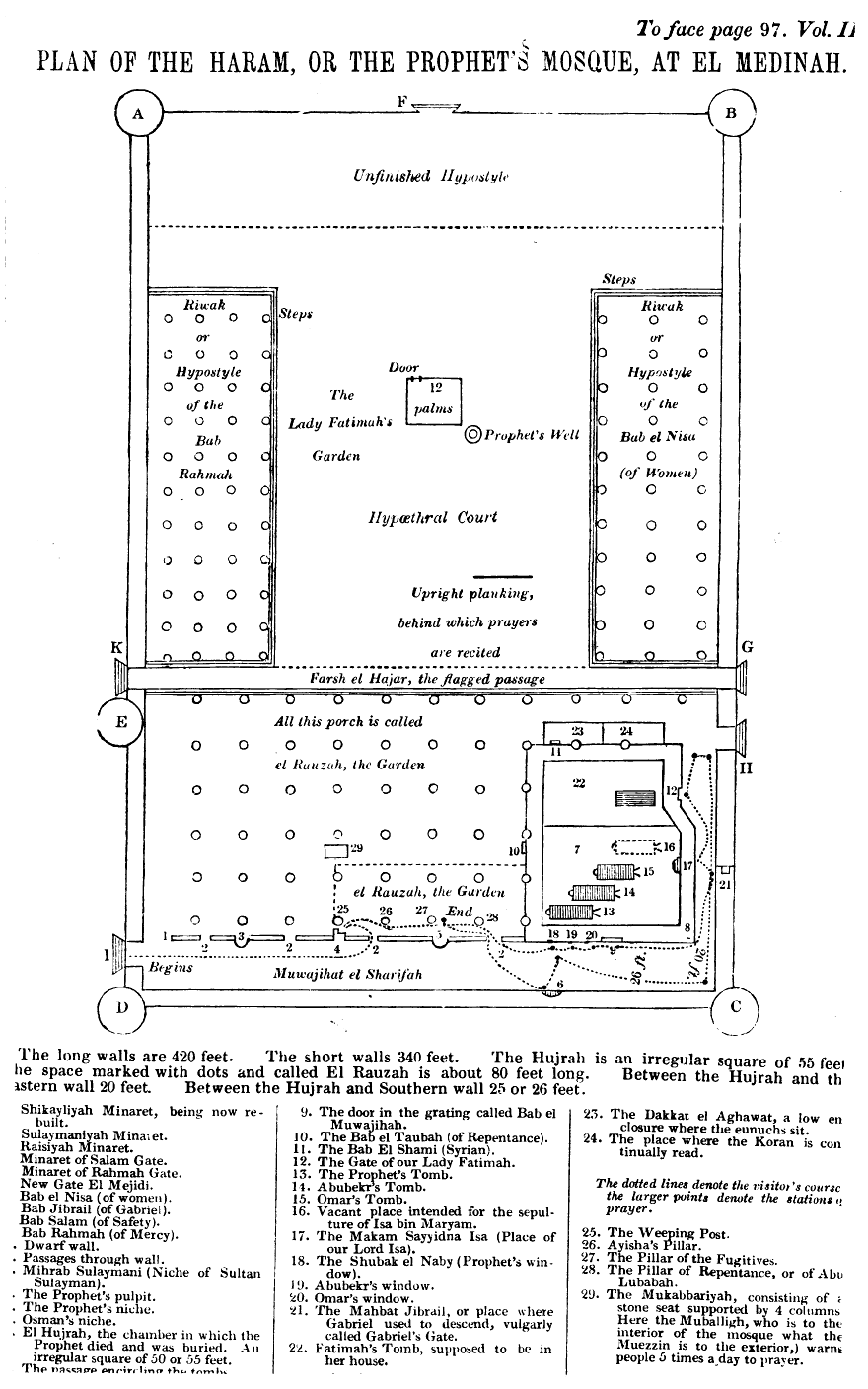
A plan of the mosque in 1857 indicating the location of the minarets

== Gallery ==
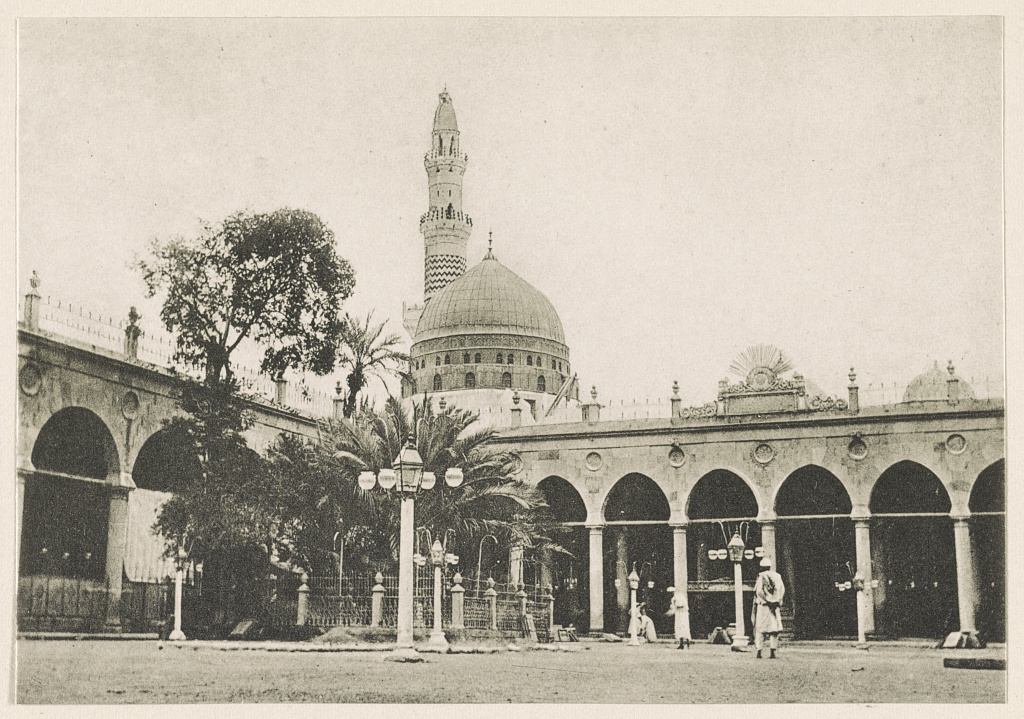
The mosque in 1916 from the inner courtyard facing south

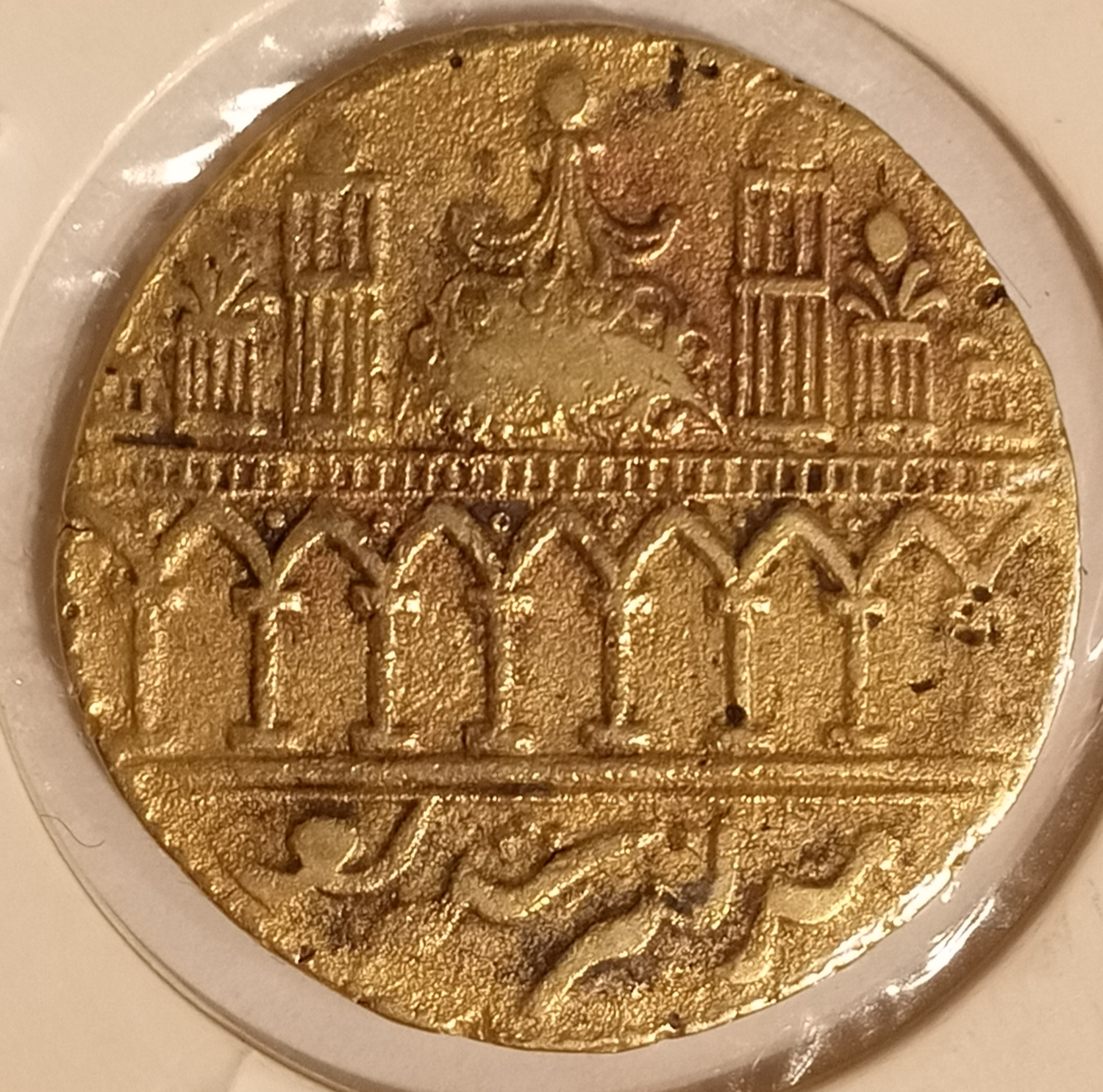
An 18th-century bronze token depicting the original Mamluk era dome, where the Green Dome stands today

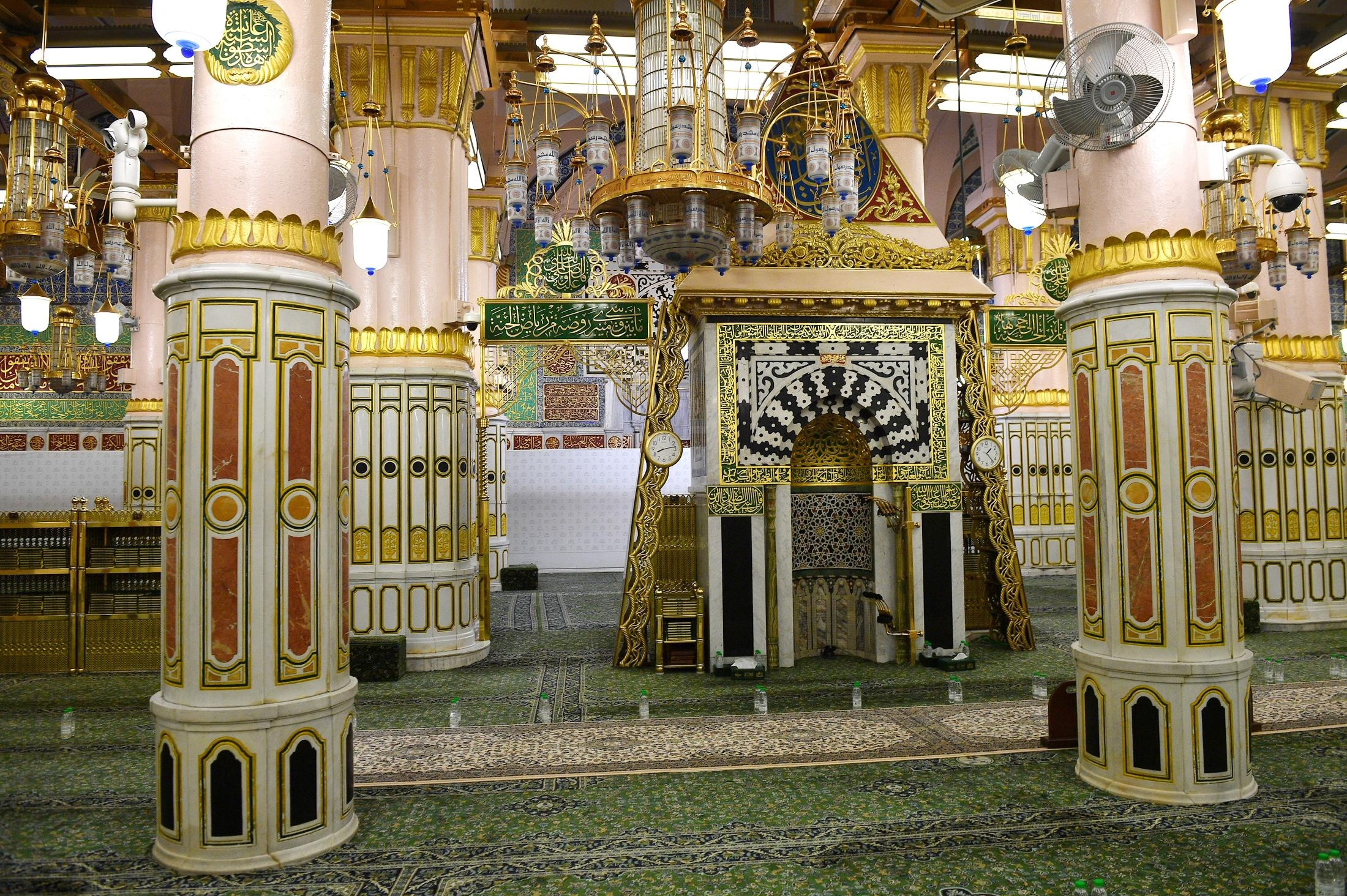
Nabawi Mihrab in the Rawda

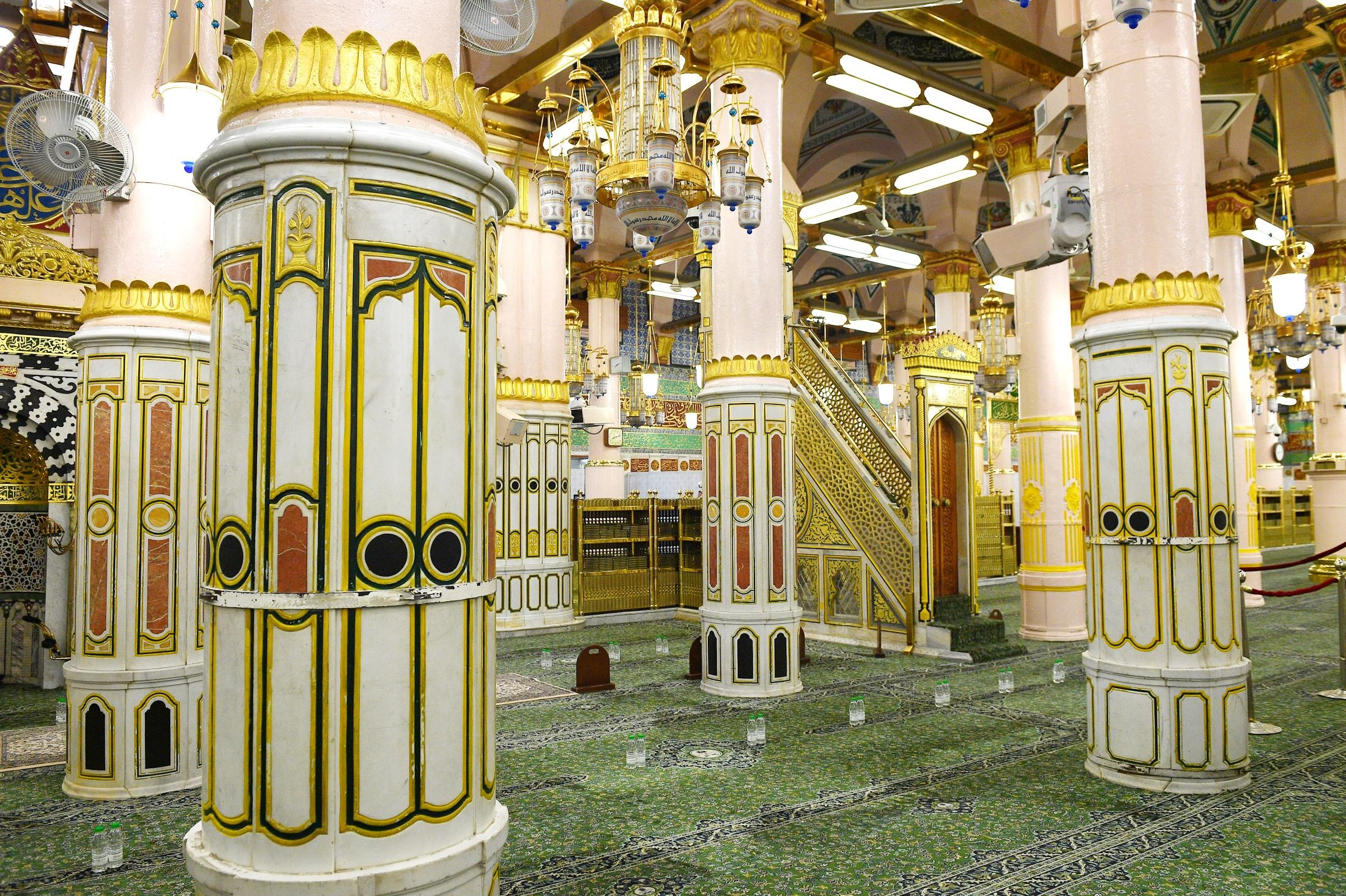
Columns indicating the area of the Rawda

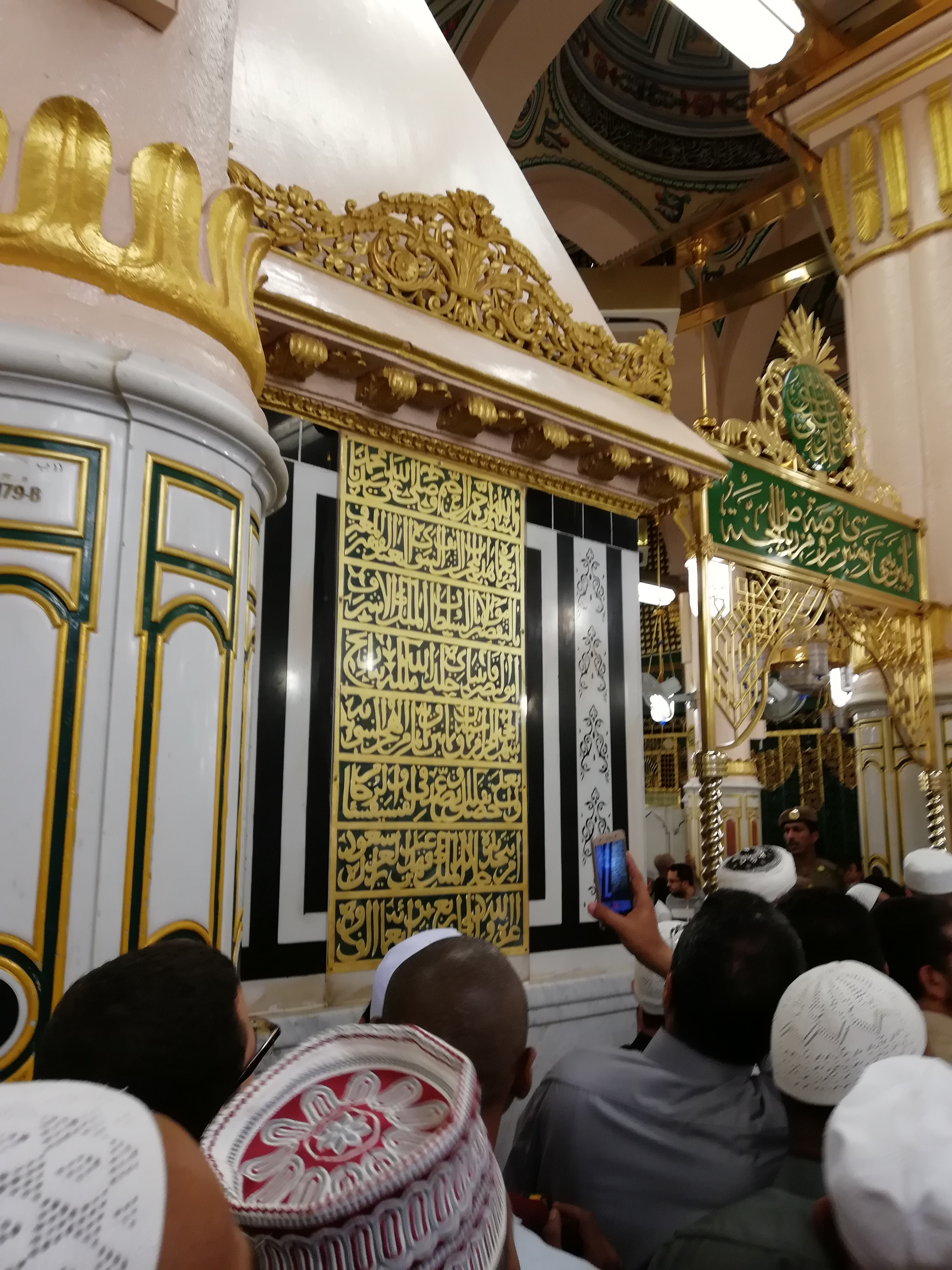
The inscription plaque behind the Nabawi mihrab commemorates its original construction under Sultan Qaitbay and its later renovation during the reign of King Fahad.

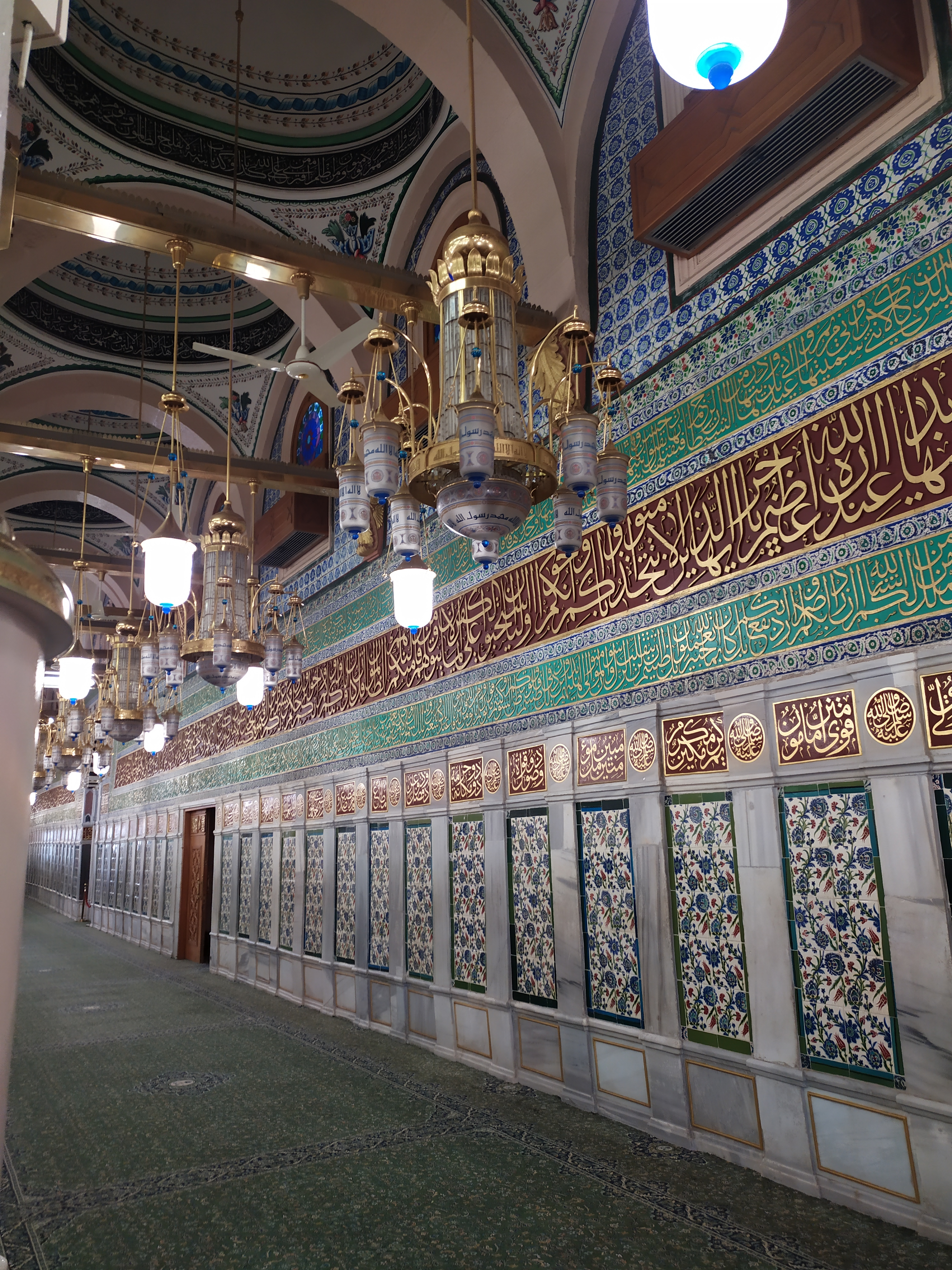
Part of the Qibli wall, the southernmost section of the mosque where the Uthmani Mihrab is located

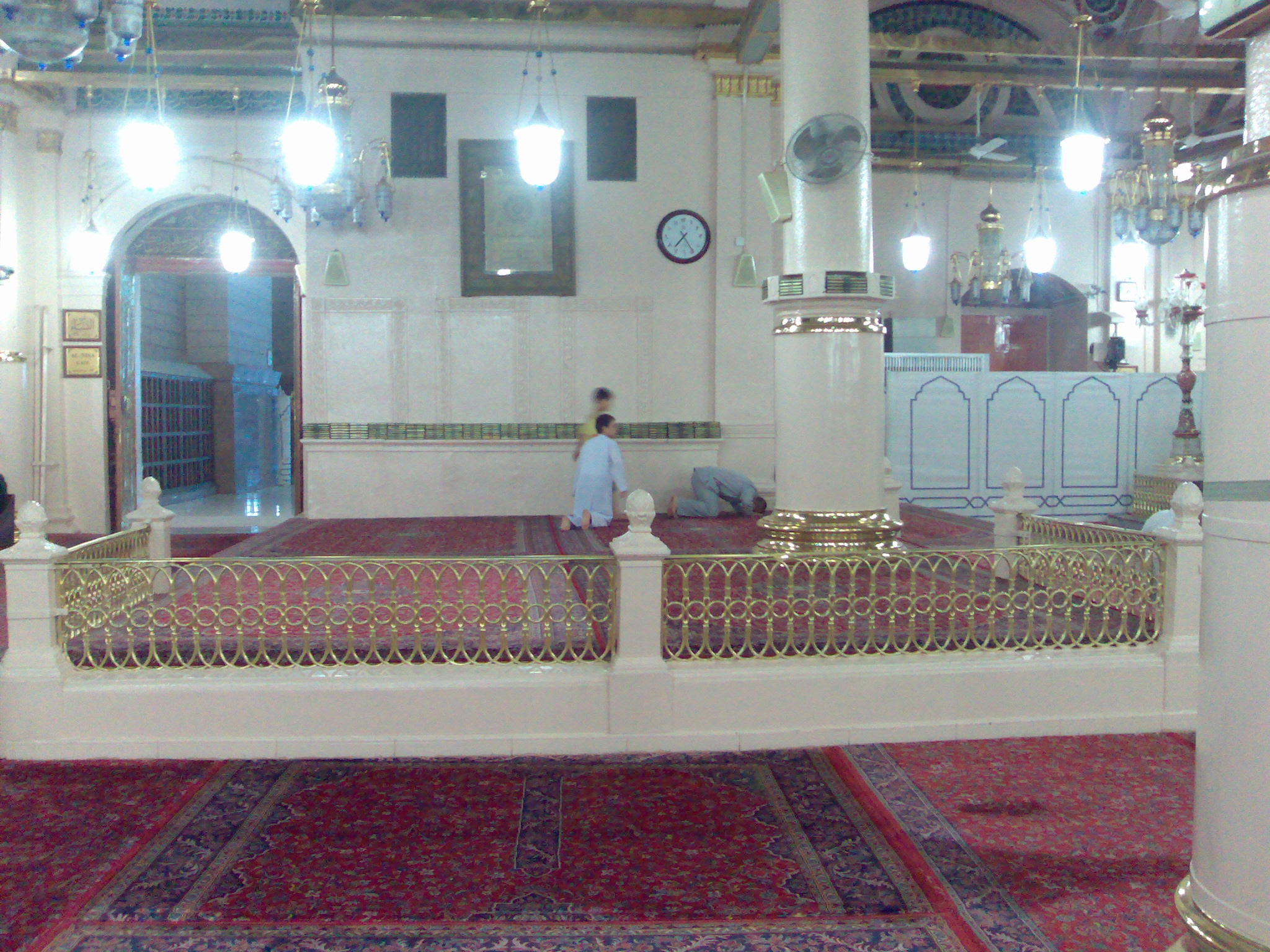
Dikkat al-Aghawat (Al-Suffah) (2007)

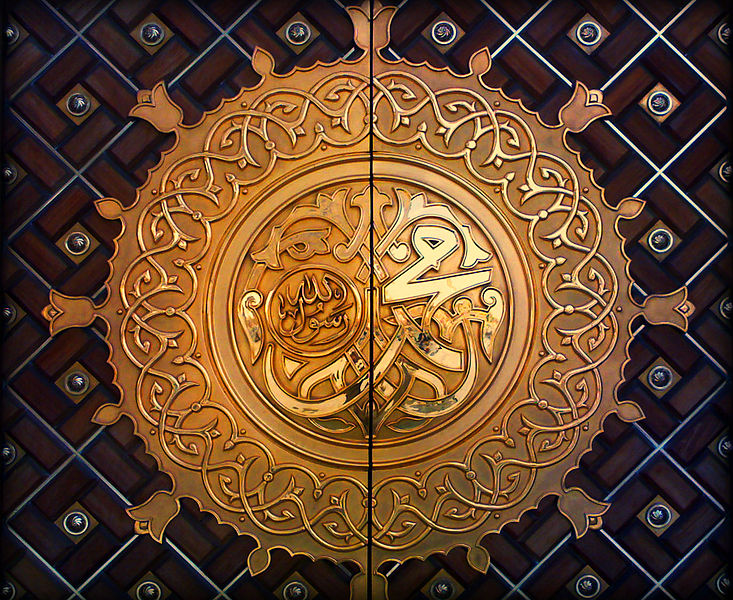
"Muhammad the Messenger of God" inscribed on the gates of the mosque

== List of recent Imams ==
- Ali ibn Abdur-Rahman al Hudhaify – chief of imams at Prophet's Mosque
- Salah Al Budair – deputy chief of imams at the Prophet's Mosque
- Abdulbari ath-Thubaity
- Saleh Al-Maghamsi
- Abdulmohsen Al-Qasim
- Abdullah bin Abdurahman al-Baijan
- Ahmad bin Ali al-Hudhaify, son of Ali ibn Abdur-Rahman al Hudhaify
- Muhammad Barhaji, guest imam in Ramadan 2024, appointed permanent imam in October 2024
- Abdullah Qarafi, appointed in October 2024
- Khalid al Muhanna

== See also ==
- Destruction of early Islamic heritage sites in Saudi Arabia
- Early medieval domes
- Holiest sites in Shia Islam
- Holiest sites in Sunni Islam
- Islamic art
- List of burial places of founders of religious traditions
- List of mosques in Saudi Arabia
