= Sefar =

Swiss screen printing and filtration company

Sefar Holding AG
- Company type: Stock corporation
- Industry: Textile Industry
- Founded: 1833 / 1907
- Headquarters: Thal, Switzerland
- Key people: Markus Heusser (CEO)
- Revenue: 367 Mio. CHF in 2023
- Number of employees: 3000
- Website: www.sefar.com

Sefar Group is a Swiss company specialized in screen printing and filtration applications. It is based in Heiden and Thal. Since its founding, it has specialized in the development, production, and distribution of precision fabrics. It has a history dating back to the early 19th century. In 2023, Sefar employed around 3,000 people worldwide, including 780 only in Switzerland, and achieved a revenue of CHF 367 million.

The fabrics produced by Sefar are used in a variety of industries, including filtration and separation, screen printing and the production of innovative, functional fabrics.

== History ==
The Sefar Group has existed in its current legal form since 1907 and is still owned by the six founding families. However, its roots go back to 1830, when Pierre Antoine Dufour started producing silk handkerchiefs for flour sieves in Thal in the canton of St. Gallen on behalf of Heinrich Bodmer, who had become the richest person in Zürich at the time through silk gauze production. Since then, the company has gone through several important development phases.

1833: Founded by Pierre A. Dufour and start of production in Thal.

1835: Expansion, including the first business trip to the United States.

1842: After the death of Pierre A. Dufour, his wife Anna-Joséphine Dufour-Onofrio took over the management.

1900: The first international branch opens in New York.

1907: Merger of six independent family businesses, which strengthened the market position.

1930er: Transition from hand looms to mechanical looms.

1950er: Switch from silk to synthetic fibers, adapting to new market requirements.

1965: Introduction of synthetic monofilament fabrics, expansion of the product portfolio.

1995: The merger of three companies "Seidengazefabrik, Thal (SST)", "Seidengazefabrik, Zürich (SSZ)" and "Züricher Sacheuchfabrik (ZBF)" to form Sefar, which is derived from the term "SEiden-FAbrikanten Réunion".

1997: Market orientation and expansion in Asia with the opening of a weaving mill in Kabin Buri district, Thailand.

2007: Opening of the weaving mill in Sighişoara, Romania.

2009: Strategic takeover of Monosuisse and expansion of the product range.

2014: Extension building in Lalelelor in the industrial area of Sighişoara.

== Organizational structure and leadership ==
Sefar has experienced various leadership changes over the years. Christoph Tobler, who served as CEO for over 17 years, retired in 2022 and was replaced temporary by Renato Luck. Under Tobler's leadership, the company experienced significant international expansion and strengthened its market position through the acquisition of Monosuisse. The current CEO of Sefar Group is Markus Heusser.

== Locations and global presence ==
With headquarters in Heiden and a holding company in Thal, Switzerland, Sefar has built a global network of subsidiaries and production facilities. Sefar operates weaving mills in Switzerland, Romania, Mexico and Thailand. With Monosuisse, the Sefar Group has its own yarn production with locations in Switzerland, Germany, Poland, Romania and Mexico^{.} Sales offices are located in 30 countries worldwide.

== Sustainability and social responsibility ==
Sefar undertakes many sustainability initiatives to reduce their environmental footprint. By installing solar modules on the roofs of production buildings in Romania, Germany, Thailand and Mexico. In addition, the installation of heat recovery systems in the production units at Monosuisse and the conversion from conventional lighting to highly efficient LED systems is another step that has been implemented in recent years
