= Maguindanao people =

Austronesian ethnic group in the Philippines

Maguindanaon people
Magindanawn مڬندنون
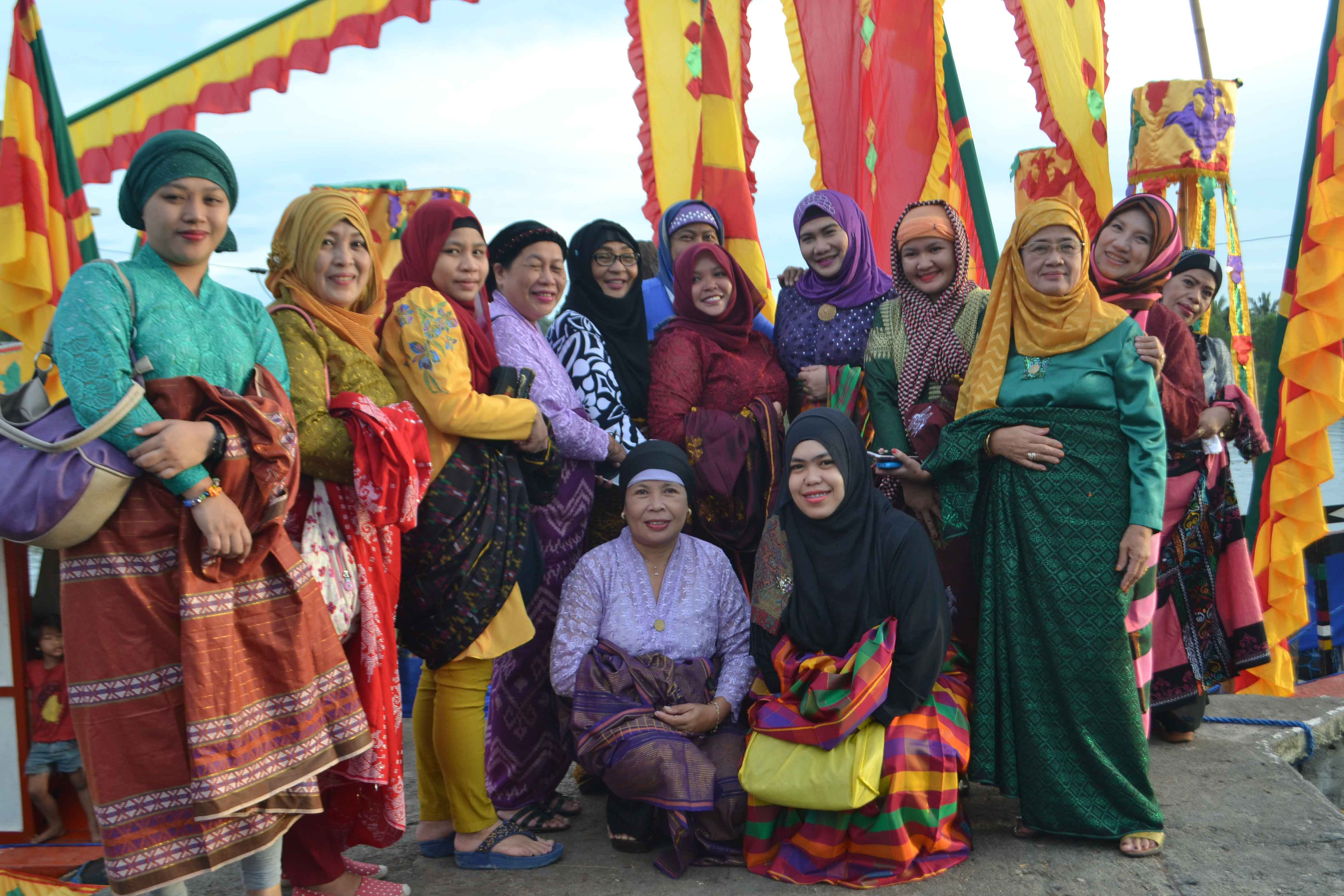
- Maguindanaon women at S.K Festival.

Total population
- 2,021,099 (2020 census) (1.9% of the Philippine population)

Regions with significant populations
- Philippines (Bangsamoro, Soccsksargen, Zamboanga Peninsula, Davao Region, Manila, Cebu)
- Maguindanao: 1,101,885
- Sultan Kudarat: 243,445
- Cotabato: 214,015
- South Cotabato: 41,721
- Sarangani: 41,516
- Zamboanga del Sur: 41,255
- General Santos City: 40,073
- Metro Manila: 38,861
- Zamboanga Sibugay: 12,910
- Bukidnon: 10,709
- Davao City: 8,258
- Zamboanga del Norte: 4,030
- Rizal: 3,168
- Cavite: 2,816
- Davao del Norte: 2,658

Languages
- Native; Maguindanaon; Also; Hiligaynon • Cebuano • Filipino • English

Religion
- Predominantly Sunni Islam

Related ethnic groups
- Maranao, Iranun, Kalagan, Lumad, Sama-Bajau, other Moro peoples, Visayans, other Austronesian peoples

The Maguindanaon people are an Austronesian ethnic group from the Philippines. The Maguindanaon are part of wider political identity of Muslims known as Moro, who constitute the third largest ethnic group of Mindanao, Sulu and Palawan. The Maguindanaons constitute the ninth largest Filipino ethnic group and are known for being distinguished in the realm of visual art. They have been renowned as metalworkers, producing the wavy-bladed keris ceremonial swords and other weapons, as well as gongs. The Maguindanaons historically had an independent sultanate known as the Sultanate of Maguindanao which comprises modern day Maguindanao del Norte, Maguindanao del Sur, Zamboanga Peninsula, Davao Region and Soccsksargen. The name "Maguindanao/Magindanaw" itself was corrupted by Spanish sources into "Mindanao", which became the name for the entire island of Mindanao.

== Etymology ==
The word Maguindanao or Magindanaw means "people of the flood plains", from the word Magi'inged that means "people or citizen" and danaw that means "lake or marsh". Thus Maguindanao or Magindanaw can also be translated as "people of the lake", identical to their close neighbors, the Maranao and Iranun. These three groups speak related languages belonging to the Danao language family.

== History ==
=== Origins and relationships ===
==== Legend of Mamalu and Tabunaway ====
Before the arrivals of the first Muslim missionaries, the ancestors of both Maguindanaon and Teduray peoples lived as one in the Cotabato lowlands, among them the brothers Mamalu and Tabunaway. When the first missionary, Sharif Kabungsuwan, came to preach Islam, the younger Tabunaway embraced the faith while the elder Mamalu refused, holding to old beliefs. To maintain peace between the conflicting faiths, the brothers formed a pact for Mamalu to settle in the mountains and Tabunaway to remain in the lowlands along the Pulangi, both with their respective followers. Thus, after separating, over time the lowland Muslims led by Tabunaway became the Maguindanaon and the highland animists of Mamalu the Teduray. The brothers then maintained their relationship despite separation by sending goods to each other using a magical boat that could drive by itself crossing the river under command by the brothers. Both groups have since maintained a largely peaceful relationship through history.

=== Maguindanao Sultanate ===
The royal flag of the Sultanate of Maguindanao.

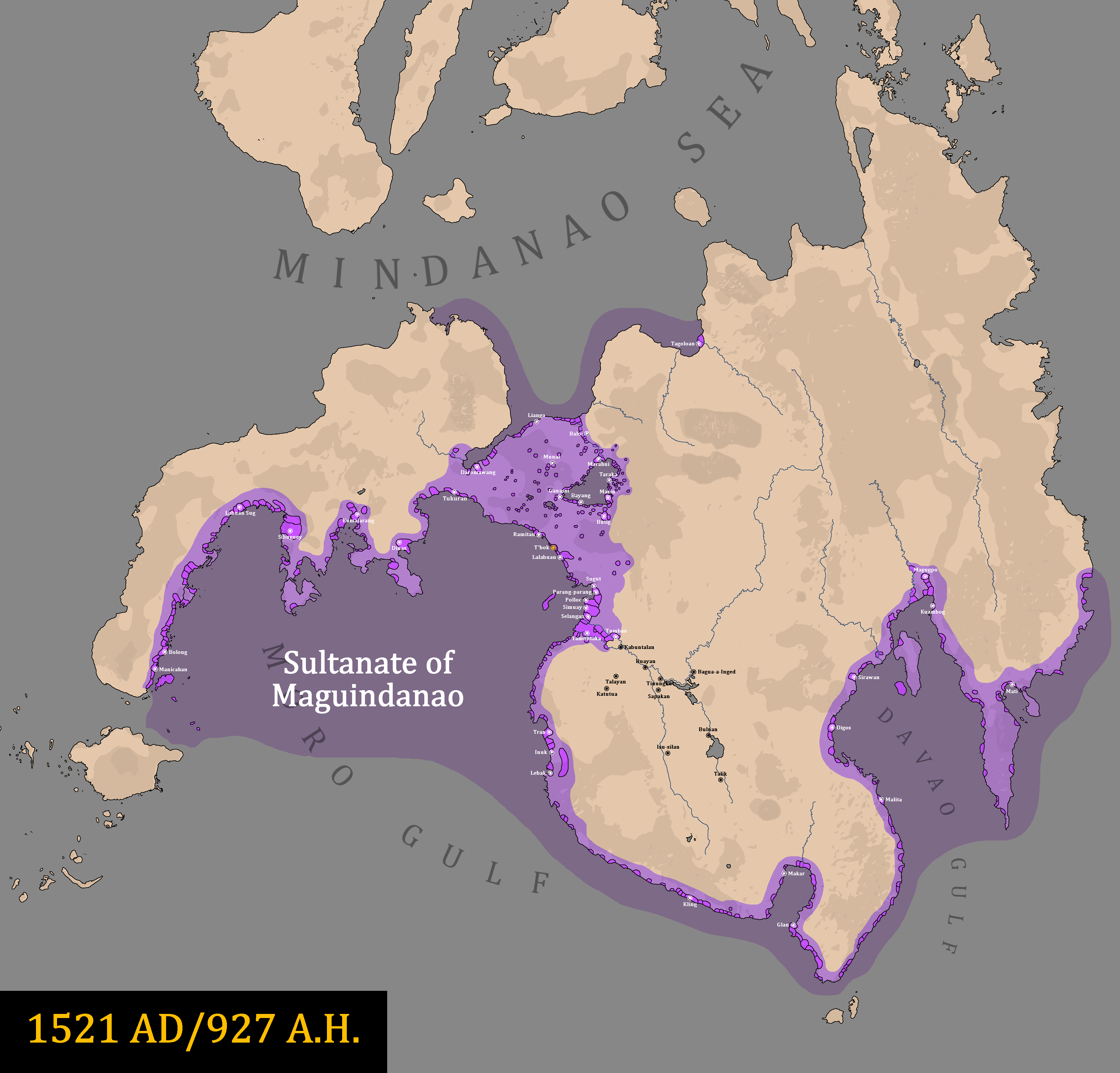
The map of the Sultanate of Maguindanao in 1521.

In the early 16th century, Sharif Muhammad Kabungsuwan, an Arab-Malay preacher from the Royal House of Malacca, arrived in what is now Malabang, introduced Islamic faith and customs, settled down with a local princess, and founded a Sultanate whose capital was Cotabato. The other center of power in the area, Sultanate of Buayan, once located in modern-day Datu Piang, Maguindanao del Sur, has an even longer history dating back to early Arab missionaries, who, although not able to implant the Islamic faith, introduced a more sophisticated political system. In Buayan, the transition to Islam took a longer time. Spanish chronicles were told that Buayan, and not Cotabato, was the most important settlement in Mindanao at that time.

==== Spanish period ====
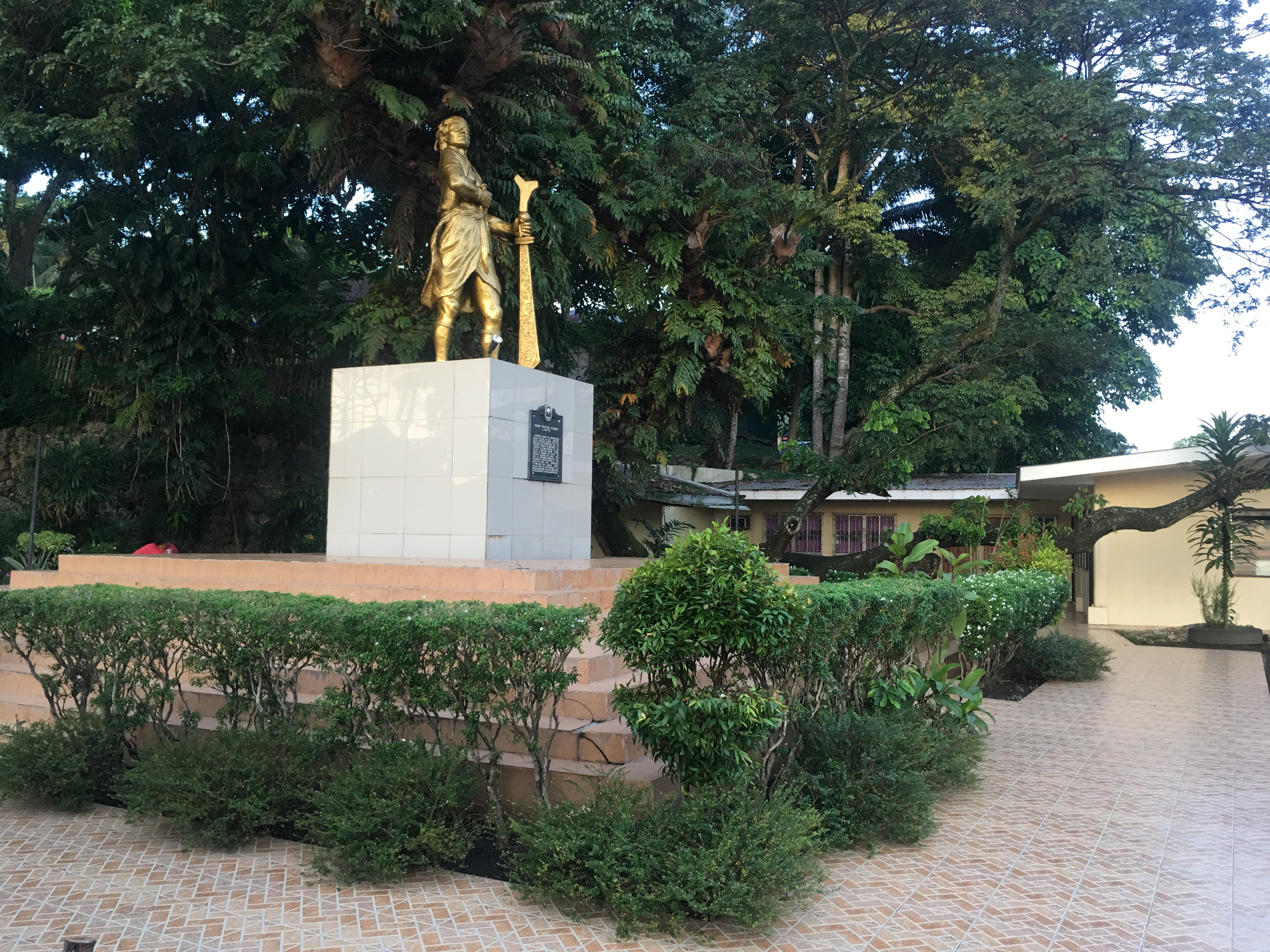
The Sultan Kudarat monument at Tantawan Park. He is one of the most powerful rulers of the Sultanate of Maguindanao. During his reign, he successfully fought against the Spanish invasions and prevented the spread of Christianity in his controlled territories in Mindanao in the 17th century.

In 1579, an expedition sent by Governor Francisco de Sande failed to conquer the Maguindanao. In 1596, the Spanish government gave Captain Estevan Rodriguez de Figueroa the sole right to colonize Mindanao. He met defeat in Buayan, and later, was killed in an ambush by a Buhayen named Ubal. His forces retreated to an anchorage near Zamboanga. The rise of the Maguindanao-Cotabato power came after the defeat of Datu Sirongan of Buayan in 1606. From 1607 to 1635, new military alliances were formed, this time with Cotabato. By the 1630s, Cotabato had become a coastal power. In the early 17th century, the largest alliance composed of the Maguindanao, Maranao, Tausug, and other Muslim groups was formed by Sultan Kudarat of Maguindanao, whose domain extended from the Davao Gulf to Dapitan on the Zamboanga Peninsula. Several expeditions sent by the Spanish authorities suffered defeat. In 1635, Captain Juan de Chaves occupied Zamboanga and erected a fort. This led to the defeat of Kudarat's feared admiral, Datu Tagal, who had raided pueblos in the Visayas. In 1637, Governor General Hurtado de Corcuera personally led an expedition against Kudarat, and triumphed over his forces at Lamitan and Ilian. Spanish presence was withdrawn in 1663, providing an opportunity for Kudarat to re consolidate his forces.

From 1663 to 1718, Maguindanao influence extended as far as Zamboanga in the west, Cagayan de Oro in the north, Sarangani in the south, and Davao in the east. In 1719, the Spaniards reestablished control with the building of the strategic Fort Pilar in Zamboanga (Miravite 1976:40; Angeles 1974:28; Darangen 1980:42-45). The 1730s saw the weakening of the Maguindanao sultanate, as it struggled with civil war and internal disunity. Spanish help was sought by the besieged rajah mudah (crown prince), further destroying the prestige of the sultanate. Thus, Cotabato power became increasingly dependent on Spanish support. This deepening compromise with Spain led Cotabato to its downfall. Fearing Buayan's reemerging power, Sultan Kudarat II finally ceded Cotabato to Spain in return for an annual pension of 1,000 pesos for him, and 800 pesos for his son. Buayan, under Datu Uto, had, by the 1860s, become the power of Maguindanao. In 1887, General Emilio Terrero led an expedition against Uto; although, he was able to destroy the kota (forts) in Cotabato, he was unable to enforce Spanish sovereignty (Miravite 1976:42; Ileto 1971:16-29). In 1891, Governor General Valeriano Weyler personally led a campaign against the Maguindanao and Maranao. In the next few months, Weyler erected a fort in Parang-Parang, between Pulangi and the Ilanun coast. This effectively stopped the shipment of arms to Uto, who died a defeated man in 1902.

=== American era ===
During the Philippine–American War, the Americans adopted a policy of noninterference in the Muslim areas, as spelled out in the Kiram–Bates Treaty of 1899 signed by Brig. General John C. Bates and Sultan Jamalul Kiram II of Jolo. The agreement was a mutual non-aggression pact which obligated the Americans to recognize the authority of the Sultan and other chiefs who, in turn, agreed to fight piracy and crimes against Christians. However, the Muslims did not know that the Treaty of Paris, which had ceded the Philippine archipelago to the Americans, included their land as well. After the Philippine–American War, the Americans established direct rule over the newly formed "Moro Province", which then consisted of five districts—Zamboanga, Lanao, Cotabato, Davao, and Sulu. Political, social, and economic changes were introduced. These included the creation of provincial and district institutions; the introduction of the public school system and American-inspired judicial system; the imposition of the cedula; the migration of Christians to Muslim lands encouraged by the colonial government; and the abolition of slavery. Datu Ali of Kudarangan, Cotabato refused to comply with the antislavery legislation, and revolted against the Americans. In October 1905, he and his men were killed. The Department of Mindanao and Sulu replaced the Moro province on 15 December 1913. A "policy of attraction" was introduced, ushering in reforms to encourage Muslim integration into Philippine society.

In 1916, after the passage of the Jones Law, which transferred legislative power to a Philippine Senate and House of Representatives, polygamy was made illegal. However, the Muslims were granted time to comply with the new restrictions. "Proxy colonialism" was legalized by the Public Land Act of 1919, invalidating Muslim Pusaka (inherited property) laws. The act also granted the state the right to confer land ownership. It was thought that the Muslims would "learn" from the "more advanced" Christian Filipinos and would integrate more easily into mainstream Philippine society.

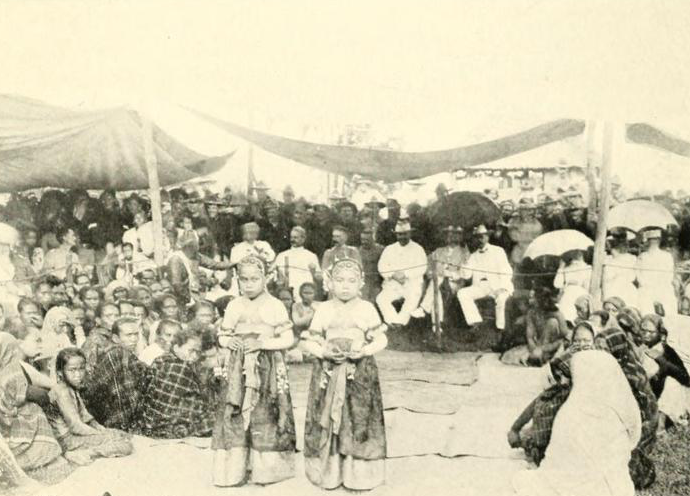
Maguindanaon girls dancing in Cotabato City, Mindanao (1913).

In February 1920, the Philippine Senate and House of Representatives passed Act No. 2878, which abolished the Department of Mindanao and Sulu and transferred its responsibilities to the Bureau of Non-Christian Tribes under the Department of the Interior. Muslim dissatisfaction grew as power shifted to the Christianized Filipinos; it was one thing to be administered by the militarily superior Americans, another by their traditional enemies, the Christian Filipinos. Petitions were sent by Muslim leaders in 1921 and 1924 requesting that Mindanao and Sulu be administered directly by the United States. These petitions were not granted. Isolated cases of armed resistance were quickly crushed. In Cotabato, Datu Ambang of Kidapawan attempted to incite a jihad (holy war) against the Americans and the Christian Filipinos. This, however, did not take place when the governor of the province mobilized government forces.

Realizing the futility of armed resistance, some Muslims sought to make the best of the situation. In 1934, Arolas Tulawi of Sulu, Datu Menandang Pang and Datu Blah Sinsuat of Cotabato, and Sultan Alaoya Alonto of Lanao were elected to the 1935 Constitutional Convention. In 1935, only two Muslims were elected to the National Assembly.

The Commonwealth years sought to end the privileges the Muslims had been enjoying under the earlier American administration. Muslim exemptions from some national laws, as expressed in the Administrative Code for Mindanao, and the Muslim right to use their traditional Islamic courts, as expressed in the Moro board, were ended. The Bureau of Non-Christian Tribes was replaced by the Office of the Commissioner for Mindanao and Sulu, whose main objective was to tap the full economic potentials of Mindanao not for the Muslims but for the Commonwealth. These "development" efforts resulted in discontent which found expression in the various armed uprisings, mostly in Lanao, from 1936 to 1941. The Muslims are generally averse to anything that threatens Islam and their way of life. Che Man (1990:56) believes that they were neither anti-American nor anti-Filipino, but simply against any form of foreign encroachment into their traditional way of life. During World War II, the Muslims in general supported the fight against the Japanese, who were less tolerant and harsher to them than the American Commonwealth government.

=== Independent Philippines ===
After independence, efforts to integrate the Muslims into the new political order met with stiff resistance. It was unlikely that the Muslims, who have had longer cultural history as Muslims than the Christian Filipinos as Christian, would surrender their identity. The conflict was exacerbated in 1965 with the "Jabidah Massacre", in which Muslim soldiers were allegedly eliminated because they refused to invade Sabah. This incident contributed to the rise of various separatist movements—the Muslim Independence Movement (MIM), Ansar el-Islam, and Union of Islamic Forces and Organizations. In 1969, the Moro National Liberation Front (MNLF) was founded on the concept of a Bangsa Moro Republic by a group of educated young Muslims. The leader of this group, Nur Misuari, regarded the earlier movements as feudal and oppressive, and employed a Marxist framework to analyze the Muslim condition and the general Philippine situation. In 1976, negotiations between the Philippine government and the MNLF in Tripoli resulted in the Tripoli Agreement, which provided for an autonomous region in Mindanao. Negotiations resumed in 1977, and the following points were agreed upon: the proclamation of a Presidential Decree creating autonomy in 13 provinces; the creation of a provisional government; and the holding of a referendum in the autonomous areas to determine the administration of the government. Nur Misuari was invited to chair the provisional government, but he refused. The referendum was boycotted by the Muslims themselves. The talks collapsed and fighting continued (Che Man 1988:146-147).

When Corazon C. Aquino became president, a new constitution, which provided for the creation of autonomous regions in Mindanao and the Cordilleras, was ratified. On 1 August 1989, Republic Act 673 or the Organic Act for Mindanao created the Autonomous Region in Muslim Mindanao (ARMM), which encompasses Maguindanao, Lanao del Sur, Sulu, and Tawi-Tawi.

== Language ==
The Maguindanao language is the native language of the Maguindanaons. Aside from this, most are able to speak Filipino, and English in varying levels of fluency. Arabic is also used among madrasah-educated Maguindanaons, being the liturgical language of Islam, a religion of most Maguindanaons. It is also spoken and understood fluently by Maguindanaon expatriates in the Middle East.

Maguindanaon residents of both Soccsksargen and the rest of Mindanao can speak and understand Hiligaynon (main Visayan language in the former) and to the some extent, Cebuano and Ilocano along with their own native language since Mindanao (particularly in Soccsksargen) is a melting pot of cultures, resulting from southward migration from Luzon and Visayas since the 20th century.

English	Maguindanaon
What is your name?	Ngin i ngala nengka?
My name is Muhammad	Muhhamad i Ngala ku
How are you?	Ngin i betad engka?
I am fine, [too]	Mapia aku, [bun]
Where is Ahmad?	Endaw si Ahmad?
He is at the house	Lu sekanin sa waley
Thank you	Sukran
‘I am staying at’ or ‘I live at’	Pegkaleben aku sa/Pedtana aku sa
I am here at the house.	Sia aku sa walay.
I am Hungry.	Kagutem aku.
He is there, at school.	San sekanin, sa Pengagian.
fish	seda
leg	lisen
hand	lima
person	tau

== Area ==
Maguindanaons are traditionally native to the present-day provinces of Maguindanao del Norte, Maguindanao del Sur and the present-day Soccsksargen region, where the historical sultanates of Maguindanao and Buayan once stood that also included parts of the present-day regions of Davao and Zamboanga Peninsula.

Maguindanaons can be found residing either temporarily or permanently outside of their regional realms, especially in urban areas throughout the Philippines, including Bukidnon, Metro Cagayan de Oro, Iligan, Metro Cebu, Metro Manila, Bulacan, Laguna, Rizal and Cavite.

Like other overseas Filipinos, Maguindanaons have been migrated to the other countries as skilled workers. They are found mainly in Muslim-populated territories such as Middle East and Malaysia but they have even built diasporas in non-Islamic nations and regions such as Singapore, Hong Kong, Taiwan, Europe, North America, Australia and New Zealand. Most female Maguindanaons in the Middle East work as servants and nannies, but many took nursing and even other few white-collared jobs such as office clerks.

== Culture ==
Maguindanaon are known for their distinguished in the realm of visual art. Historically, they have been renowned as metalworkers, producing the wavy-bladed keris ceremonial swords and other weapons, as well as gongs. The Sagayan dance became well-known because of the Maguindanaons, this dance depicted in dramatic fashion the steps of their hero, Prince Bantugan, took upon wearing his armaments, the war he fought in and his subsequent victory afterwards. Performers, depicting fierce warriors would carry shields with shell noisemakers in one hand and double-bladed sword in the other attempting rolling movements to defend their master. They are also known for their great music in kulintang and agung such as Binalig a Mamayog and Sinulog a Bagu.

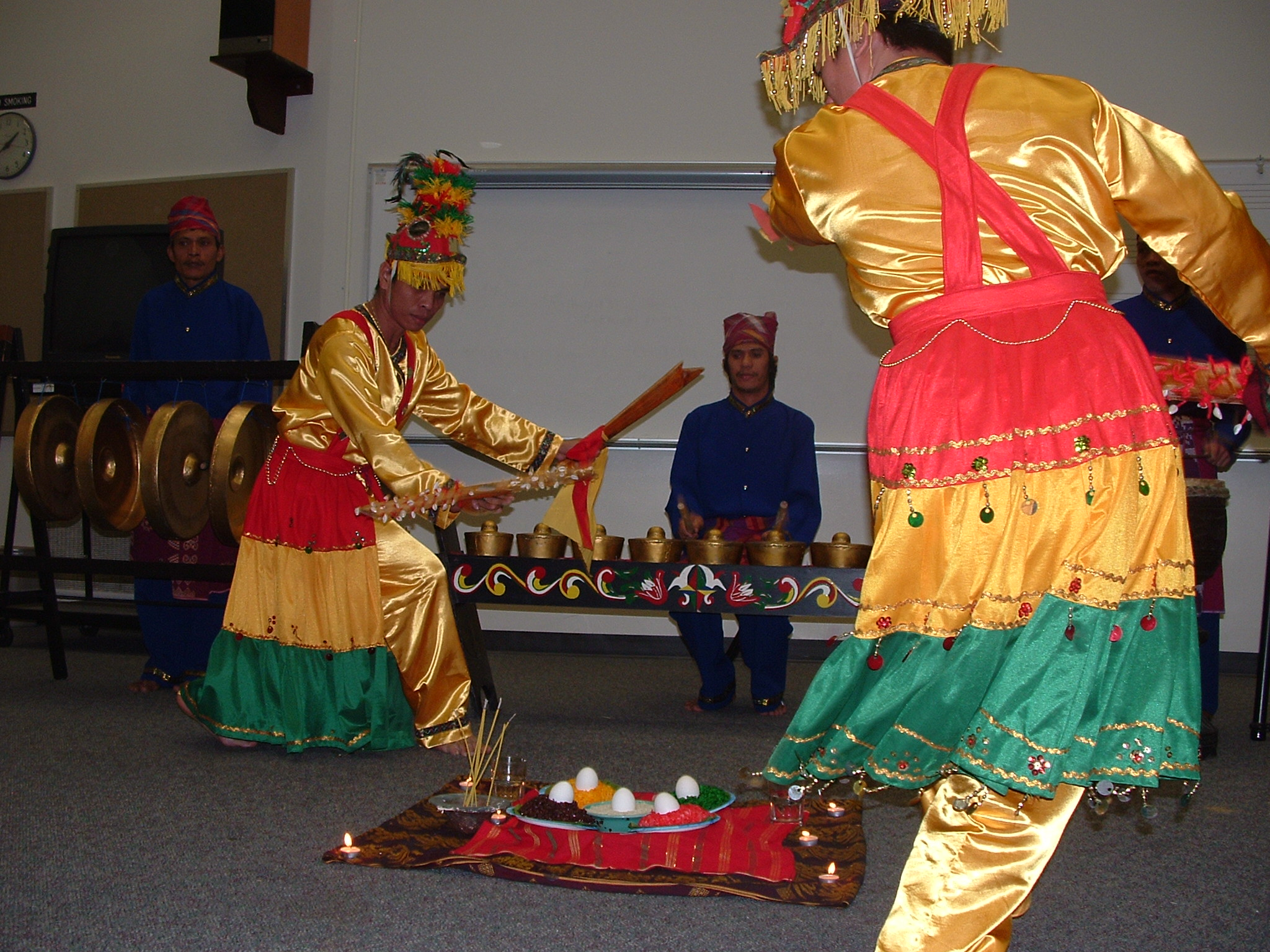
Two Maguindanaon dancers performing the Sagayan.

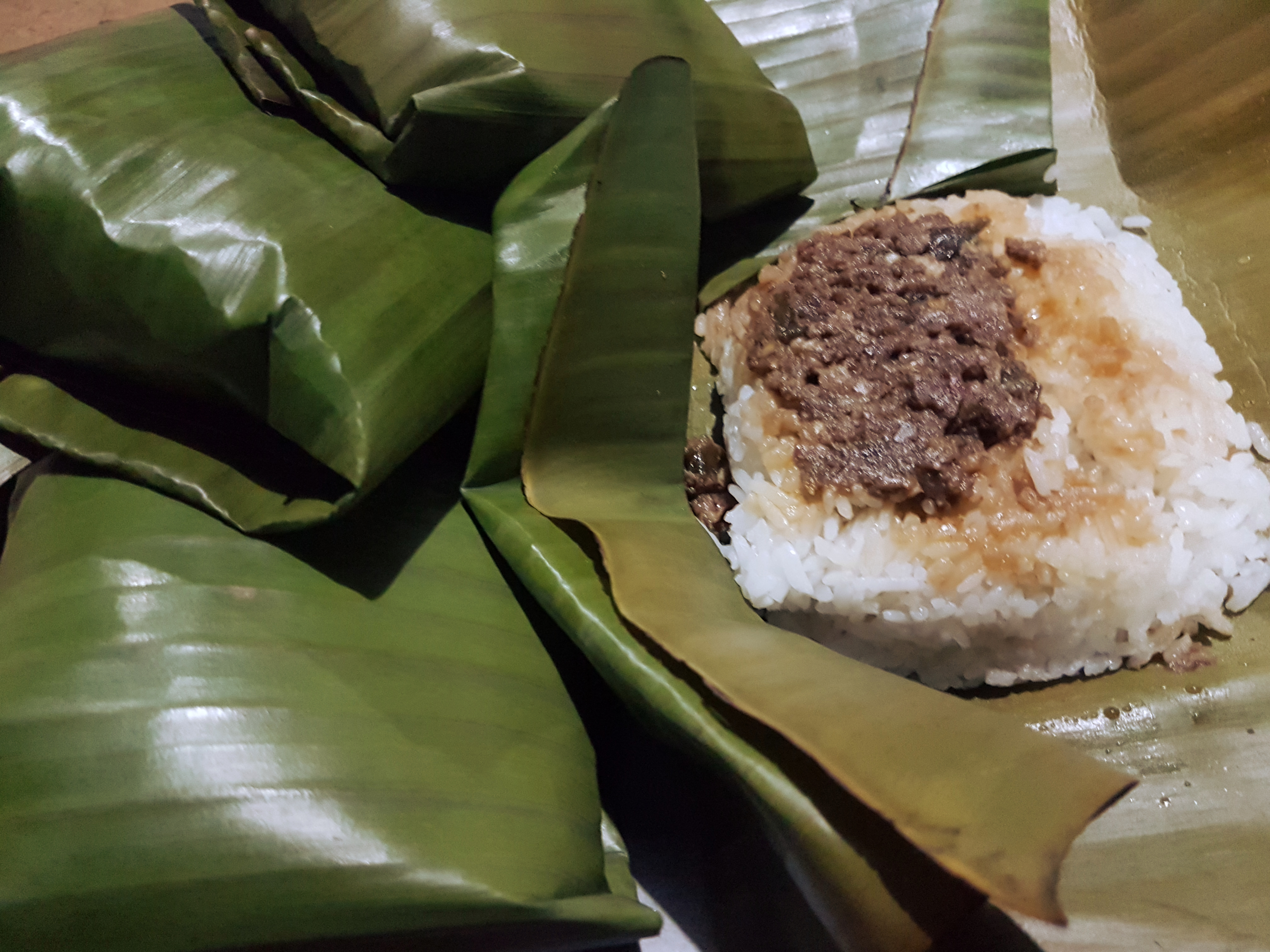
Pastil, a traditional Maguindanaon food.

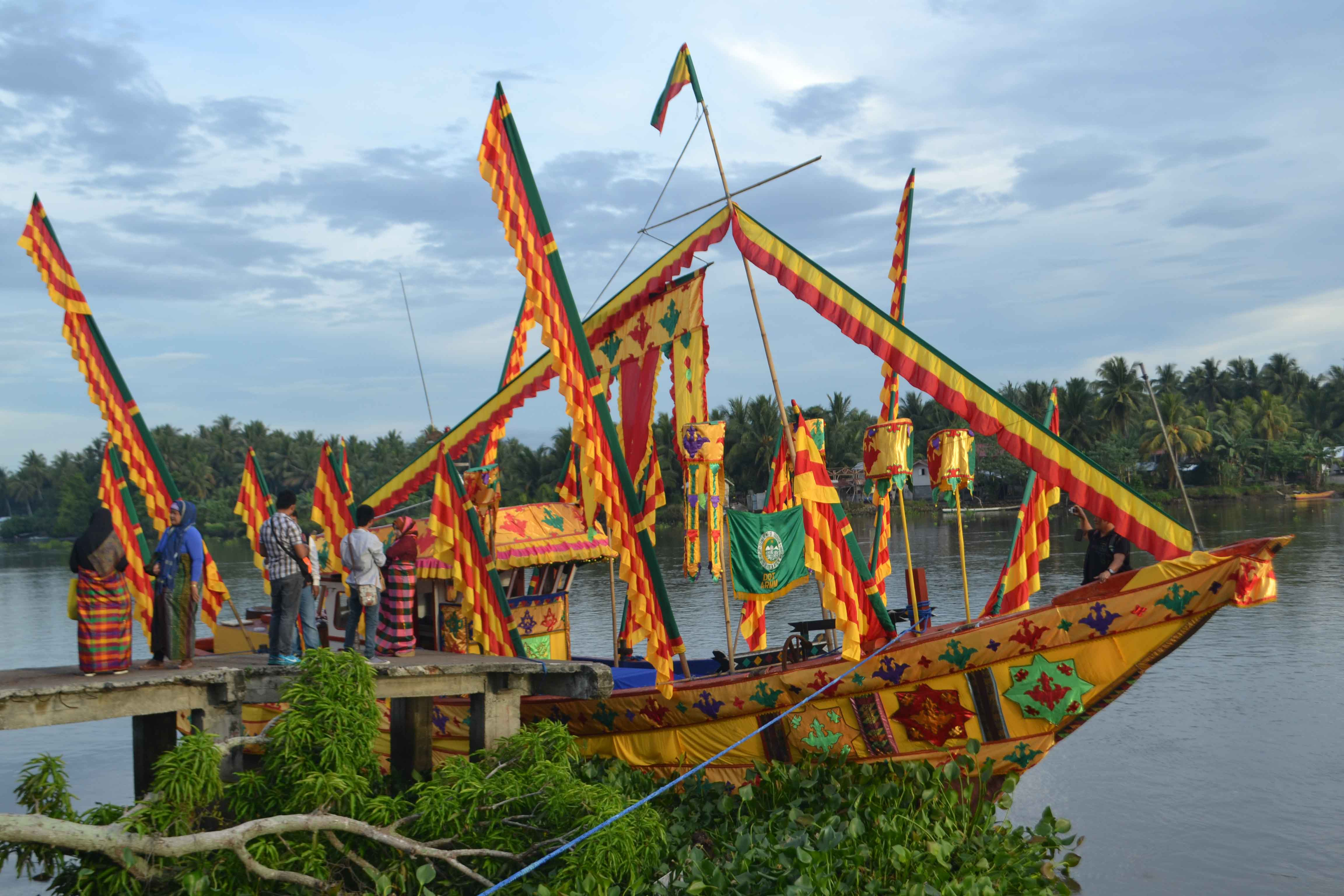
Guinakit, a Maguindanaon boat transportation used by royals and tribal chieftains around the inland waters of Mindanao.

=== Literary arts ===
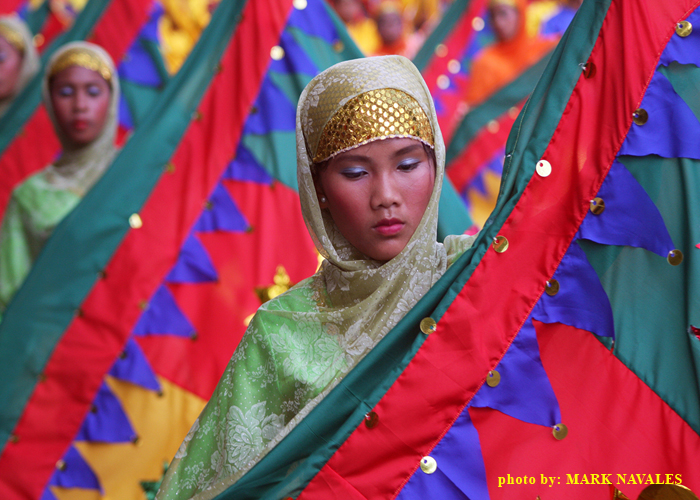
A Maguindanaon dance performed during the T'nalak Festival in Koronadal, South Cotabato.

The literary elements of the Maguindanao include folk speech and folk narratives. The folk speech is expressed in the antuka/pantuka/paakenala (riddles) and bayok (lyric poems), while the narratives may be divided into the Islamic and folk traditions. The Islamic includes the Quran; tarsila or genealogical narratives; the Luwaran, an embodiment of customary laws; hadith or sayings of Muhammad; quiza or religious stories. The folk traditions consist of tudtul (folktales) and the epics Raja Indarapatra, Darangen, and Raja Madaya.

==== Riddles ====
For the Maguindanao, riddles promote friendship in a group. They are also tools for basic pedagogy. The structure of a Maguindanao riddle consists of an image and a subject. There are four types of images: comparative, descriptive, puns or puzzles, and narrative. The Maguindanao believe in a basic unity underlying the various aspects of the environment and this belief is reflected in the use of often conflicting image and subject in the riddles (Notre Dame Journal 1980:17).

Riddling involves a group of people, one of which is the riddler. If one volunteers to be a riddler, he/she has to have a riddle ready or else be subject to dtapulung (ridicule), which is given not as a criticism but as part of the riddling tradition. The Maguindanao consider bad riddlers as those who add to or subtract from the "original" text of the riddler. Riddling can take place anytime and anywhere as long as there is some form of group activity in progress; it can be done during work or recreation or both.

Ambiguities of answers can be settled by an old man or somebody who is respected in the barangay (the basic political unit). In this sense, riddles allow a certain flexibility in their solutions; that is, they point to various logically possible solutions, thus providing some form of basic pedagogy. An example of this would be: "Sia den, inia den. (It is here, it is there.)" "Wind" is one answer, and there are other possible answers, such as "cradle".

Riddles also represent the world view of the Maguindanao. For example: "Cannibal in the forest, that eats only a head" to which the answer is "hat". Although cannibals and hats do not share anything in common, they are reconciled with the use of metaphors, such as "that eats only heads".

Other beliefs involving riddling is that it should not be done at night, so as not to invite the participation of evil spirits. Another belief associated with riddling at night is the avoidance of the word nipai (snake). If the use of the word cannot be avoided, euphemisms are resorted to, e.g., "big worm" (Notre Dame Journal 1980:20-25).

Maguindanao verses are expressed through such forms as ida-ida a rata (children rimes sung in chorus), or through tubud-tubud (short love poem). For instance:

                       Pupulayog sa papas ka pumagapas apas
                       Ka tulakin kon ko banog
                       Na diron pukatalakin
                       Ka daon kasakriti.
                       Kanogon si kanogon nakanogon ni ladan ko
                       A pukurasai mamikir a ana palandong a dar
                       Na di akun mapkangud a bologang ko sa gugao
                       Ka Oman akun ipantao na pusulakan a ig
                       O matao kandalia.

                       Flying hard, the swift is
                       Trying to catch up with the hawk
                       But he cannot equal him
                       Because he is far too small
                       Woe, woe unto me
                       Worried from thinking of a loved one
                       And I cannot let my feelings prevail, express my love
                       Because every time I want to reveal it
                       Stops it in its way.

Composed in metaphorical language, the bayok is resorted to when a cautious and euphemistic expression is required. An example (Wein 1983:35-36):

                       Salangkunai a meling
                       A malidu bpagimanen,
                       Ka mulaun sa dibenal
                       Dun-dun ai lumaging
                       A paya pagilemuan
                       Ka mumbus sa hakadulat
                       Na u saken idumanding
                       Sa kaludn pun na is
                       na matag aku 'ngka maneg
                       di ku mawatang galing.

                       Talking Salangkunai
                       T'is hard to trust in you,
                       For untrue leaves could sprout
                       Dun-dun fond of chatting
                       T'is hard believing you
                       For cheating buds may show
                       Once I [start to] fondle
                       From the sea
                       You would just hear from me
                       My darling, close to me.

==== Tudtul (folktales) ====
Tudtul (folktales) are short stories involving simple events. Two examples are presented.

The Lagya Kudarat tells the adventures of the two children of Lagya (rajah) Mampalai of Lum who are blown away after Mampalai laments the lack of viable partners for his children. These two children are Lagya Kudarat and Puteli (princess) Sittie Kumala. Puteli Kumala is blown to a forest where she meets a kabayan (in all Maguindanao stories, this character is associated with an old unmarried woman). The kabayan adopts her, as she earlier did the prince named Sumedsen sa Alungan. Although Kumala and Sumedsen live in the same house, they never speak to each other. Later, because of peeping toms, Kumala leaves and Sumedsen goes with her. They find their way to Lum, where a happy reunion takes place. Sumedsen eventually marries Kumala. Meanwhile, Lagya Kudarat is blown to Kabulawanan. There he meets another kabayan who allows him to live with her. One day while hunting, Kudarat hears the game of sipa (rattan ball kicked with the ankle) being played. He proceeds to the direction of the game and is invited to play. Not knowing how to play, he accidentally causes the sipa to fall in front of the princess who is sitting beside the window. She throws him her ring and handkerchief. The marriage between the princess and Kudarat is then arranged. After the wedding, Kudarat feels homesick; his wife then suggests that they go back to Lum. There is a happy reunion. A week later, Kudarat and his wife returns to Kabulawanan to live with his in-laws (Notre Dame Journal 1980:3-6).

Pat-I-Mata narrates the story of two brothers—Pat-I-Mata and Datu sa Pulu. The former rules Kabalukan while the latter reigns over Reina Regente. Pat-I-Mata is so-called because he has four eyes; when his two eyes sleep, his other two are awake. He is also known for his cruelty to women, marrying them when they are beautiful and returning them after they have gone ugly. Because of this, the people of Kabalukan can no longer tolerate Pat-I-Mata's cruelty. They approach his brother and ask for his help. The Datu sa Pulu tries to advise his brother but to no avail. He then decides to kill Pat-I-Mata. So he builds a cage. Seeing the cage, Pat-I-Mata asks what it is for. The Datu replies that it is constructed to protect them from an incoming storm. Being greedy, Pat-I-Mata asks for the cage saying that the Datu can make his own anytime. The Datu pretends to hesitate but later accommodates his brother's wishes. When Pat-I-Mata and his followers enter the cage, the Datu orders the door shut. Realizing that he is tricked, he says before being thrown into the river: "Never mind, my brother. We would always be enemies -- and we will never be reconciled till eternity. I would die but I pray that whenever you go riding on a boat in the river, my spirit will capsize it" (Notre Dame Journal 1980:7-8).

Maguindanao epics are chanted and antedate Islam, the elements of which were later incorporated. The epic Raja Indarapatra deals with various characters, many of whom are imbued with supernatural powers. One portion of the epic tells the story of how two brothers, Raja Indarapatra and Raja Sulayman, save Mindanao from terrible creatures (Gagelonia 1967:288). Another portion deals with the birth of Raja Indarapatra, who is said to come from the union of Sultan Nabi and his cousin. The plot revolves around a trick the cousin, who is well versed in black magic, plays on the Sultan.

Raja Madaya is believed to be an original Maguindanao work since many of its elements—language, metaphor, objects in the tale—are Maguindanao. On the other hand, other elements in the epic point to foreign origins (Wein 1984:12-13). The epic involves various narratives one of which tells about the childless Sultan Ditindegen. In his despair, he prays for a child, promising to give it to a dragon. His wish is granted; but in time, a dragon appears to claim the now grown Princess Intan Tihaya. Hearing about Intan's plight, Raja Madaya comes to the rescue (Wein 1984:14).

==== Religious ====
Salsilas or tarsilas are family heirlooms that trace one's line of descent; they are used to ascertain noble lineages that may go back to the days of the Kabungsuan. For example, a tarsila recounts the adventures of Datu Guimba who leads the first group of Maguindanao to Labangan. According to the account, he marries the local princess Bai-alibabai and adopts the title, Datu sa Labangan. The next to arrive at Labangan is Datu Buyan Makasosa Kanapia, an adventurer, who marries a Maranao. Together, Datu Guimba and Kanapia rule Labangan. Other datu arrive in time, namely: Datu Maulona Taup Consi and Datu Canao Sultan Maputi (Alfanta 1975:4-5).

The Luwaran is a set of encoded adat laws that deal with murder, theft, and adultery, as well as with inheritance and trade. The laws apply to all regardless of class and has since become the basis of modern Islamic jurisprudence (Darangen 1980:33).

The Hadith are the sayings and practices of Muhammad, collected, compiled, and authenticated by Islamic scholars. Hadith constitute one of the sources for Islamic law and jurisprudence. They are also used to explain and clarify certain points in the Quran. The language used is Arabic.

Religious quiza are stories written in Arabic and are used by the imam to teach Islam to children. An example is the "Izra-wal-Miraj", which tells the story of why Muslims pray five times a day. Muhammad is awakened one night by the angel Diaba-rail. He then rides on a burrak and travels to Masjid-el-Agsa in Jerusalem, where he sees a bright light that leads to heaven. Each layer of heaven has a different color. On the seventh layer, he hears the voice of God, and sees heaven and hell. On the way down, he is instructed by Moses to ask God that the number of prayers be reduced from 50 to 5 times daily. His request is granted.

=== Musical and performing arts ===
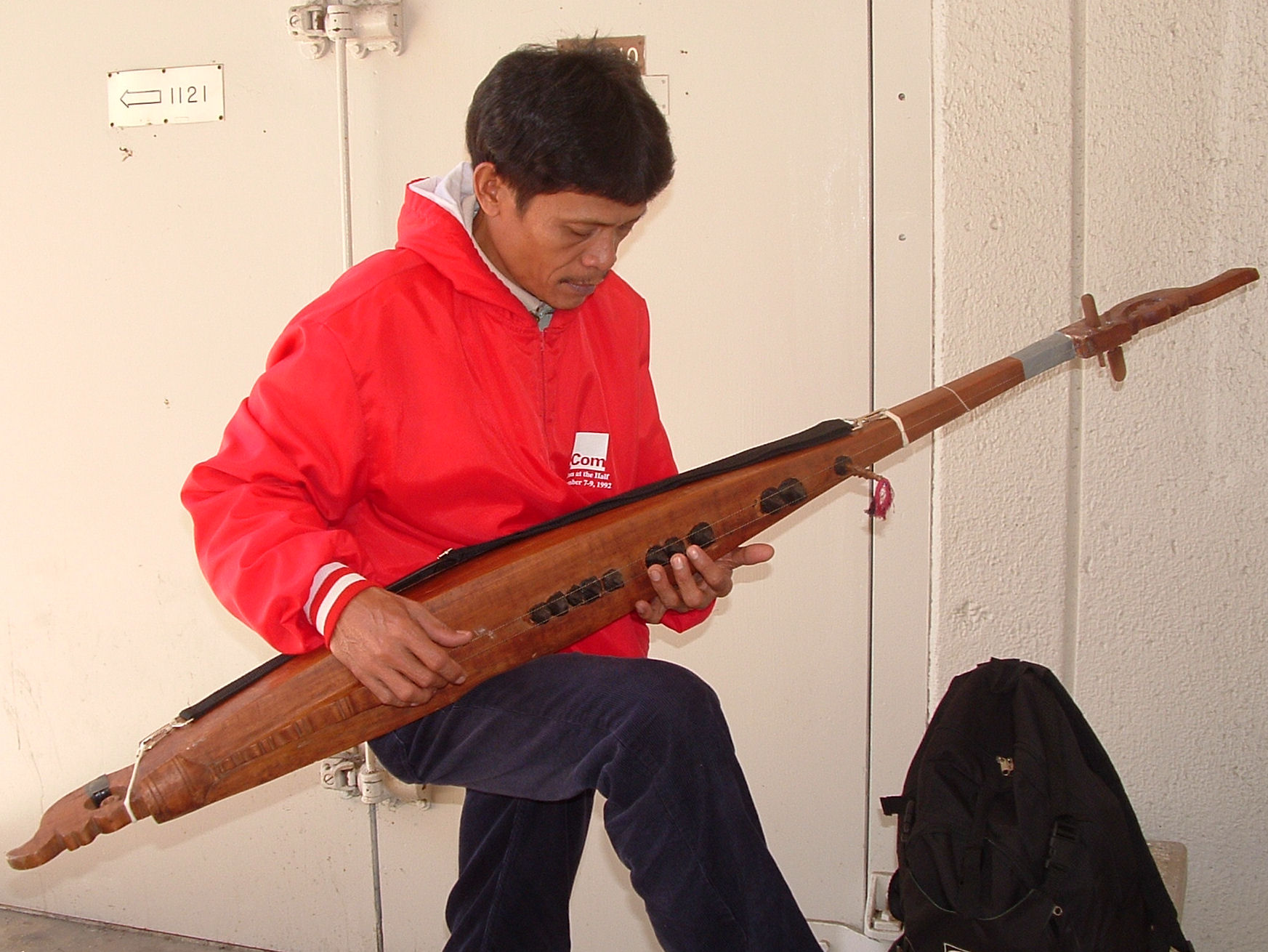
A man playing a kutiyapi, the traditional lute

The Maguindanaon have a culture that revolves around kulintang music, a specific type of gong music, found among both Muslim and non-Muslim groups of the Southern Philippines.

An underground pop music scene known as Bangsamoro pop (B-pop; also called Moropop) centered in Maguindanao and Soccsksargen has emerged in late 2000's, gaining local radio listeners and fans in the area, but also attracted some worldwide following among Maguindanaon diaspora thanks to YouTube. Notable B-pop artists include Datu Khomeini Camsa Bansuan (dubbed as the "King of Moro Songs"), Tamtax, Johnson Ampatuan, Shaira (dubbed as the "Queen of Bangsamoro Pop" known for her song "Selos"), among others who perform in such venues as barangay basketball courts, residential neighborhoods, birthday or wedding parties and even remotest areas such as forest villages rather than clubs. Their lyrics are mainly written in both Maguindanaon and Tagalog.

== Notable Maguindanaons ==
- Datu Sharrif Zainal Abedin, an influential mestizo of Arab and Maguindanaon descent married to a daughter of a very influential datu of lower Buayan, General Santos City who became the first municipal mayor.
- Salipada Pendatun, a Filipino lawyer, military officer, and politician, being the first Filipino Muslim in history to hold these offices.
- Datu Bago, was the Datu of Davao Gulf from 1800 till his death 1850, serving as vassal under the Sultanate of Maguindanao.
- Murad Ebrahim, first and interim Chief Minister of the Bangsamoro Autonomous Region in Muslim Mindanao.
- Datu Piang, founder of the royal House of Piang.
- Hashim Salamat, founder of Moro Islamic Liberation Front.
- Muslimin Sema, former mayor of Cotabato City and a member of the Moro National Liberation Front.
- Mohagher Iqbal, the nom de guerre of the member of the Moro Islamic Liberation Front.
- Pax Mangudadatu, former provincial governor of Sultan Kudarat and former Representative of the 1st district of Sultan Kudarat with Tacurong.
- Sharifa Akeel, Filipino model and titleholder of Mutya ng Pilipinas 2018 and Miss Asia Pacific International 2018.
- Khalifa Nando, the Wa'lī of Bangsamoro Autonomous Region in Muslim Mindanao.
- Esmael Mangudadatu, former governor of Maguindanao and now serving as the representative of Maguindanao del Sur's lone district.
- Pax Ali Mangudadatu, is a Filipino politician who is the governor of Sultan Kudarat.
- Mariam Mangudadatu, is a Filipina politician who has been the chief executive of Maguindanao del Sur.
- Naguib Sinarimbo, a Filipino lawyer and politician who serves as the Ministry of the Interior and Local Government (Bangsamoro).
- Mona Sulaiman, a Filipino sprinter who competed at the 1962 Asian Games and the Summer Olympics.
- Zaldy Ampatuan, fifth Governor of the Autonomous Region in Muslim Mindanao.
- Andal Ampatuan Jr., Former mayor of Datu Unsay, Maguindanao del Sur
- Gumbay Piang, a son of the Maguindanao leader Datu Piang.
- Samaon Sulaiman, a Filipino musician who is a recipient of the National Living Treasures Award (Philippines).
- Zacaria Candao, a Filipino politician who served as the first governor of the Autonomous Region in Muslim Mindanao.
- Zamzamin Ampatuan, a Filipino career bureaucrat.
- Datu Amir Baraguir, twenty-fifth Sultan of Sultanate of Maguindanao.
- Jong Madaliday, The Clash (season 1) contestant.
- Melanio Ulama, a Filipino politician, ancestral leader, and peace advocate who serves as the Ministry of Indigenous Peoples' Affairs (Bangsamoro) and a member of the Bangsamoro Transition Authority Parliament.
- Bai Mariam Mangudadatu, a Filipina politician from the province of Maguindanao del Sur.
- Ina Ambolodto, a 2016 Philippine general election senatorial candidate running under the banner of the Liberal Party (Philippines).
- Sarah Balabagan, a former domestic helper in the United Arab Emirates detained in that country after stabbing her employer to death who attempted to rape her. Originally sentenced to death, she spent a year in jail and received 100 lashes before being released and returned to the Philippines later establishing a career as a singer and entertainer. Her story was made into a movie in 1997. Born into a Muslim family, she embraced Christianity since 2003.
- Shaira, a Filipina singer who rose into stardom known for her song "Selos".

== See also ==
- Maguindanao language
