= Datu Djimbangan =

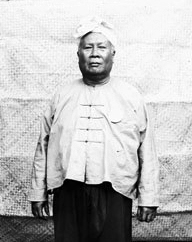

Midted Sa Inged of Kudarangan
- Died: c. Early 1900s
Names
- Datu Djimbangan Bin Sultan Bayao Bin Sultan Maitum
- House: Buayan
- Father: Sultan Bayao
- Religion: Sunni Islam

Datu Djimbangan (Guimbangan or Jimbangan) - known as Midted Sa Inged (Superintendent of the polity) of the Sultanate of Kudarangan, is the son of Sultan Bayao Bin Sultan Maitum, cousin of Datu Uto and elder brother of Sultan Tambilawan of Kudarangan and adviser to Datu Ali in the war against Pre-Spanish and the Pre-Americans Era. Datu Djimbangan lives at the old Spanish fort of Libungan, his only claim to distinction as he has but a small following. He is also known to Kabuntalan nobles as Datu Masbud (fat) because he was considered to be very fat, hot tempered and inclined to be unreconstructed. He was also known as the thievish chieftain to the Spanish Governor of Cotabato for that once could come to Datu Djimbangan's hand might well counted as lost.

Datu Djimbangan was suspected of being implicated in the murder of a soldier of the thirty-first infantry in December 1900 though it has never been proven against him. He depended for protection upon his brother Datu Ali, who was fond of him.

== History ==
=== Revolutionary period ===
When the Spanish forces evacuated Cotabato in 1899, Datu Piang felt sure that the Spaniards would never be again in authority at Cotabato, he begged Governor Vilo, the latter governor of Christian population, to let him have twenty rifles to defend himself against a rival. The Christian governor agreed to this, and week by week Datu Piangʼs demands grew until, at length, all the rifles in the possession of the Christians passed to the Moros. But there still remained some cannons, and Datu Piang, having represented the necessity of making war on another chief up the Cotabato River, Vilo was persuaded to lend them to him. Suddenly, Datu Piang, his son-in-law Datu Ali and his brother, Datu Djimbangan, at the head of a large party of armed Moros, fell upon and slaughtered the Christians. Viloʼs head was cut off.

Datu Uto and his allies Datu Piang along with loyal Moro datus marched into the town, killing and terrorizing Christian Filipinos. The Christians who were unable to escape were carried off as slaves into the interior. He and his companions made their selections for themselves, leaving the remainder for their followers. As a cruel aftermath, Datu Djimbangan (or Guimbangan) "promptly caused the Filipina women of the place to be stripped and compelled to march before him on the public plaza in a state of nudity.

=== American period ===
Datu Djimbangan was considered to be a qualified leader of Buayan and was reputed to be one of the craftiest Moros in the Cotabato valley who was supposed to have been largely responsible for the attitude taken by Datu Ali in opposing American authorities. He took the field in company with Datu Ali and was present in the Sar-Raya fort at the time of its destruction by the troops under General Wood' on March 11, 1904. After the battle, He was captured by Captain Thomas W. Darrah, at his Rancheria by a detachment under command of Major C. M. Truit, 23rd infantry. Datu Djimbangan was trying to hide his ponderous hulk behind a coconut tree when discovered by Captain Darrah, who leaped across a small stream and sprang upon the astounded Moro.

== Ending of Slavery ==
In December 1903, Moro Province announced the anti-slavery law. Wood and Taft thought that the Maguindanao would continue to follow the lead of colonial progress. Instead, the declaration of abolition destroyed the political and economic system of indirect rule over the whole valley through Datu Piang in Cotabato. The pronouncement of anti-slavery law became "radical" measure through prominent Tausug, Maranao, and Maguindanao datus to launched rebellions against it. The first rebellion was led by Tausug Chieftain Panglima Hassan when the American ignored his two requests to return his twelve runaway slave who received protections from Americans troops in Jolo. The Moro's fled and the Americans burned the fort. Hassan surrendered but then escaped, which led Wood to destroy every hostile cotta he encountered, resulting in the death of Datu Andung on Mount Suliman. Although never capturing Hassan, Wood did end up killing 1,500 Moros, which included women and children. The uprising ended in March 1904, when Hassan and two others were cornered by 400 men under Scott's command at Bud Bagsak. It took 34 gunshots to finally kill Hassan.

Datu Ali on the other hand, who is the prominent Moro chieftain and a raising leader of the north, pledge together with his allied Moro datus to fight and obeisance that they would not submit to any interference with their slave trading and holding and who is trying to impose Christianity. In May 1904, Datu Ali ambushed seventeenth Infantry killing two officers and seventeen men. Despite Wood's condemnation of Moros, he knew that the anti-slavery law would prove the flashpoint. It aroused a great deal of opposition among the Moro Datus especially Datu Ali and his brother Datu Djimbangan who's making a good deal of money in slave trading. The so-called anti-slavery law ignited their general contempt for American Authority. General Leonard Wood also reported that all of the Datus except Datu Piang is united to resist the American rule for the operation of the slave law.

== Battle of Fort Siranaya (Capture of Datu Djimbangan) ==
In March 1905, a sizeable band of Datu Ali's men was at the fort Siranaya (currently known as Sar-Raya) when U.S. troops attacked, killing many of the defenders and capturing Datu Djimbangan, leader and brother of Datu Ali and held as hostage forcing Datu Ali to surrender. Datu Ali refuse to yield and was encourage to continue the resistance by datus of Upper Cotabato (Datu Ampatuan of Maganoy, Datu Mopuk of Dapitan, Datu Tambilawan of Libungan, Datu Manalintao of Madridagao, Datu Argao of Silag, and Datu Sansaluna). The extant records of prosecutions for slavery in the Cotabato District are suggestive of the politically sensitive enforcement of the anti-slavery law. Notably, Datu Djimbangan was captured after the fall of Datu Ali kota in March 1905 by Captain Thomas W. Darrah, at his Rancheria by a detachment under command of Major C. M. Truit, 23rd infantry, hiding his ponderous hulk behind a coconut tree when discovered by Captain Darrah, who leaped across a small stream and sprang upon the astounded Moro. He was conducted as a prisoner to Cotabato and was transferred to the Zamboanga jail to await his trial for sedition and rebellion. Datu Djimbangan is sentence to five years in prison, his co-defendants to 3 years term, and the purchaser of the slave to a 2 year sentence.

== See also ==
- American Colonial Period (Philippines)
- Insular Government
- United States Military Government of the Philippine Islands#U.S. military government
