= Frank Ross McCoy =

United States Army general (1874–1954)

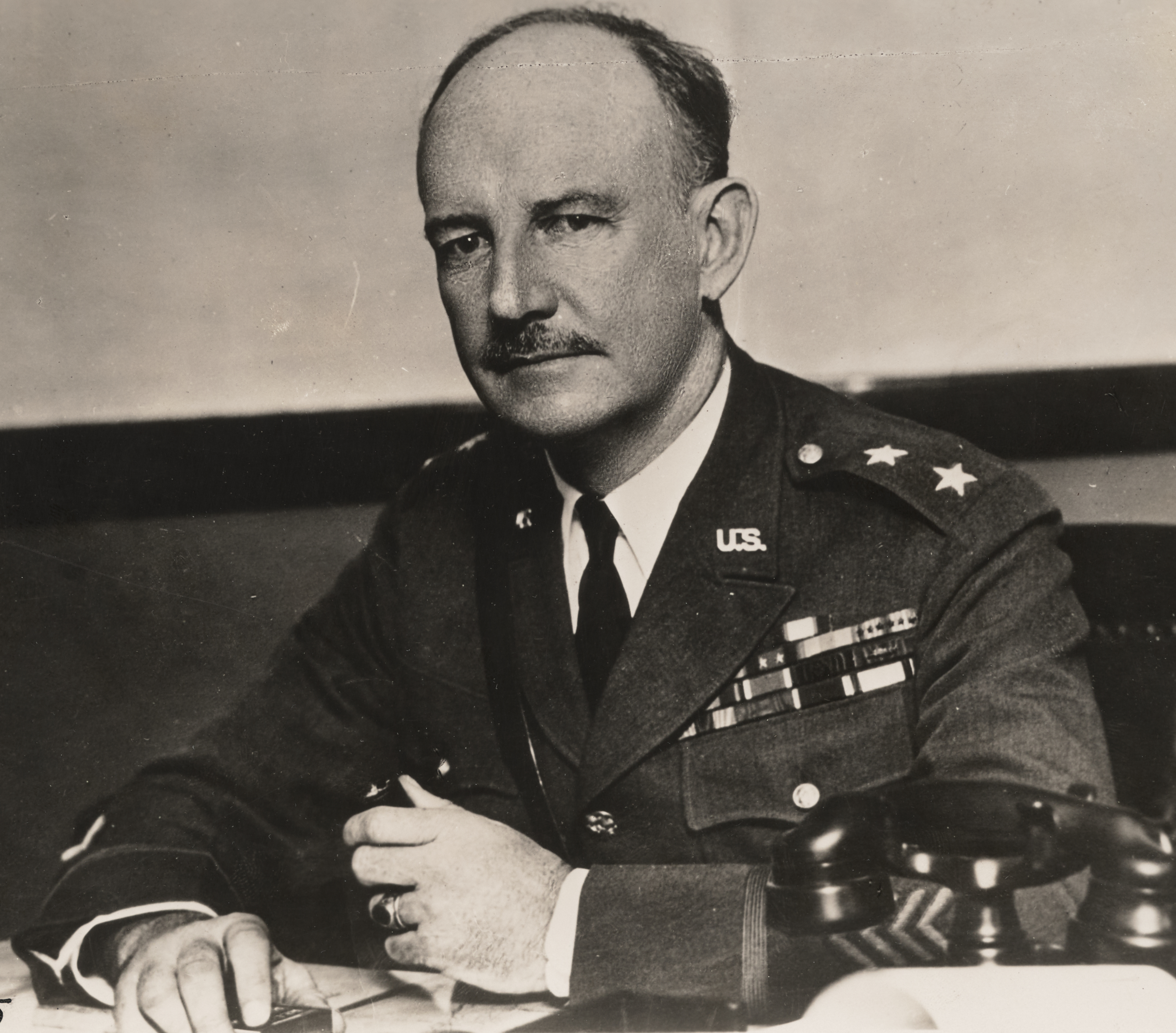
- McCoy as Fourth Corps Area commander c. 1930
- Born: October 29, 1874; Lewistown, Pennsylvania
- Died: June 4, 1954 (aged 79); Washington, D.C.
- Burial place: Arlington National Cemetery
- Military career
- Allegiance: United States
- Branch: United States Army
- Service years: 1897–1938; 1941–1943
- Rank: Major General
- Service number: 0-560
- Unit: Cavalry Branch
- Commands: First Army (Interim); Second Corps Area; Second Army and Sixth Corps Area; Seventh Corps Area; 1st Cavalry Division; Fourth Corps Area; 1st Field Artillery Brigade; 3rd Infantry Brigade; 63rd Infantry Brigade; 165th Infantry Regiment
- Conflicts: Spanish–American War: Battle of San Juan Hill; Philippine–American War: Battle of the Malala River; Bandit War; World War I World War II: Operation Pastorius
- Awards: Army Distinguished Service Medal (2); Silver Star (2); Purple Heart
- Other work: President, Foreign Policy Association (1939–1945); Chairman, Far Eastern Commission (1951–1954)

Frank Ross McCoy (October 29, 1874 – June 4, 1954) was a United States Army officer. He served in the Philippines during World War I, and led an American relief mission to Tokyo after the 1923 earthquake. He initially retired from the military in 1938, though was recalled to service in 1941 at the start of World War II, where he served on the Roberts Commission. In his civilian career, he was president of the Foreign Policy Association and chairman of the Far Eastern Commission.

== Early life ==
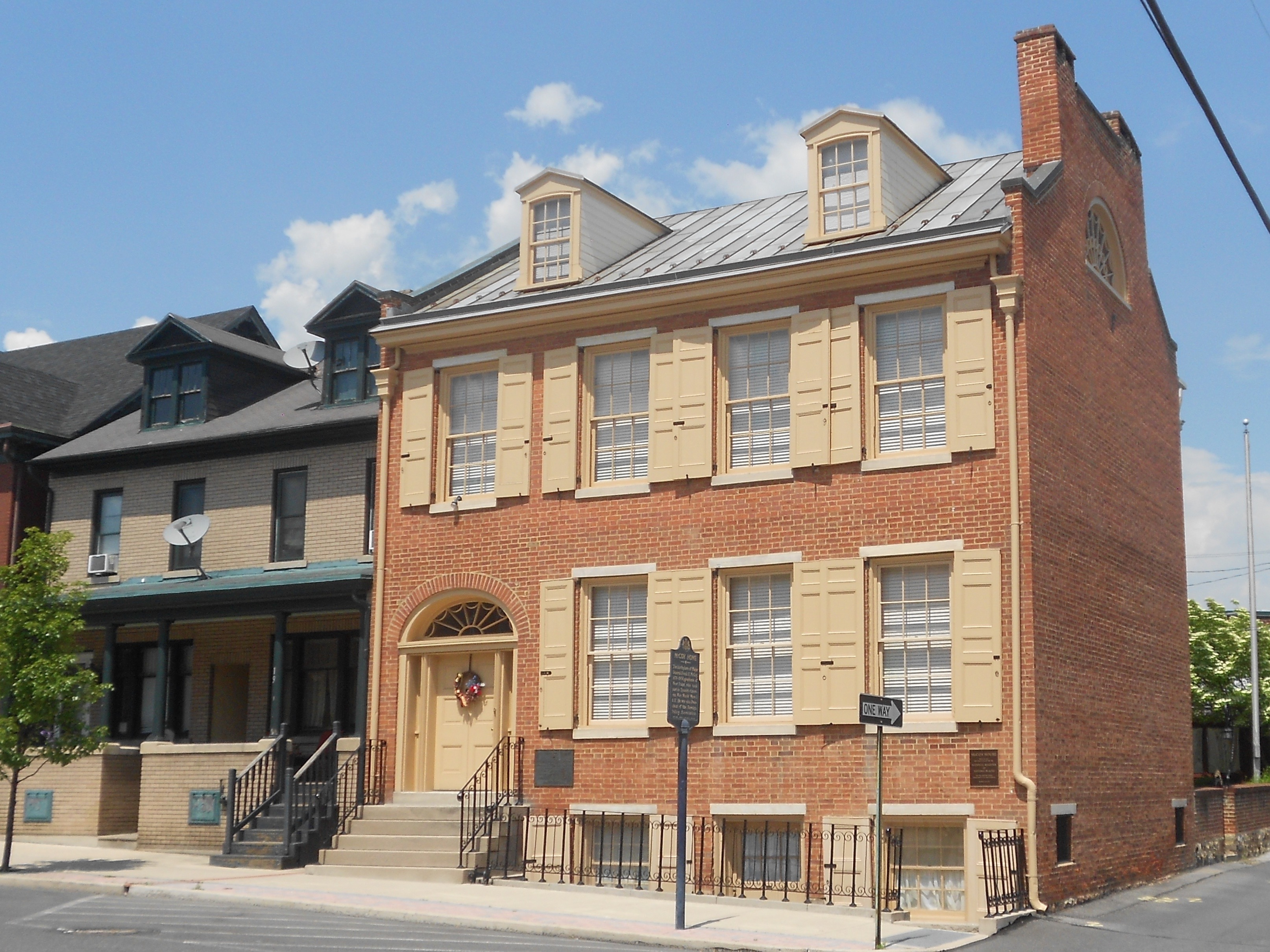
Birthplace

McCoy was born in Lewistown, Pennsylvania, on October 29, 1874. He was the son of Margaret Eleanor (Ross) McCoy and Thomas Franklin McCoy; a veteran of the Mexican–American War and American Civil War who attained the rank of brigadier general by brevet. He graduated from Lewistown High School in 1891, then attended the United States Military Academy. He graduated 34th in 1897. He received his commission as a second lieutenant and was assigned to the 8th Cavalry.

== Military career ==
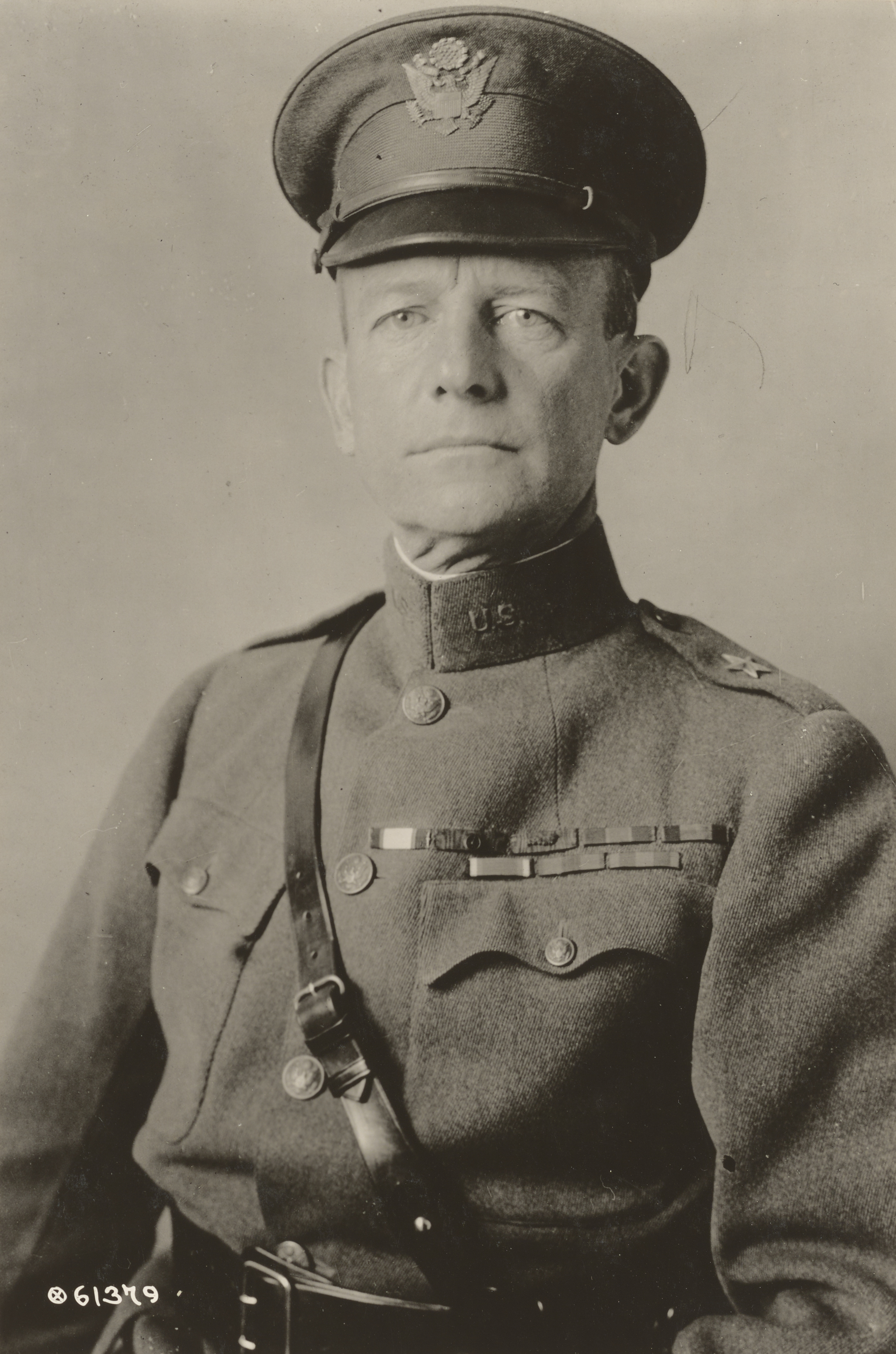
McCoy as 63rd Infantry Brigade commander c. 1919

McCoy served on the western front in Cuba, in the Santiago campaign, and in the Philippines. He fought at Las Guasimas and was wounded at San Juan. McCoy was later awarded two Silver Stars and the Purple Heart for his combat service in Cuba. In Cuba and in the Philippines, he acted as aide to General Leonard Wood and was for several years aide to President Theodore Roosevelt. During the Philippine–American War, McCoy, then a captain, commanded U.S. troops at the Battle of the Malala River in October 1905, defeating forces of the Sultanate of Buayan and killing their leader, Datu Ali.

After returning from the Philippines, McCoy began studying at the United States Army War College, graduating in November 1908. In 1911, McCoy was appointed a member of the General Staff and, in 1917, became a member of the General Staff of the American Expeditionary Forces in Europe, where he commanded the 165th Infantry Regiment in 1918. McCoy wrote Principles of Military Training (1917).

From August 1918 to March 1920, McCoy served as a temporary brigadier general. From August to November 1918, he commanded the 63rd Infantry Brigade, 32nd Division. From 1918 to 1919, McCoy was Director of Transportation in the American Expeditionary Force. In 1919, he served as chief of staff in the United States military mission to Armenia. In December 1922, McCoy received a permanent promotion to brigadier general. He led a relief mission to Tokyo after the 1923 earthquake. McCoy was subsequently awarded the Japanese Order of the Rising Sun.

After returning to the United States, McCoy served as a liaison officer in the State Department Bureau of Insular Affairs from September to December 1925. After attending a refresher course at the Infantry School until February 1926, he commanded the 3rd Infantry Brigade at Fort Sam Houston, Texas until March 1927. After attending the Field Artillery School until May 1927, McCoy commanded the 1st Field Artillery Brigade at Fort Hoyle, Maryland until September 1929.

In September 1929, McCoy was promoted to major general. From October 1929 to February 1932, he commanded the Fourth Corps Area at Fort McPherson, Georgia. From February 1932 to March 1933, McCoy served on the Lytton Commission investigating the Japanese military invasion and occupation of Manchuria. He was subsequently awarded the Chinese Order of Chia-Ho.

McCoy commanded the 1st Cavalry Division at Fort Bliss, Texas from March to October 1933. He next commanded the Seventh Corps Area at Omaha, Nebraska until February 1935. McCoy then commanded the Second Army and Sixth Corps Area at Chicago, Illinois until May 1936. He next commanded the Second Corps Area at Governors Island, New York until October 1938.

McCoy served as interim commander of First United States Army from January to October 1938, and was succeeded by James K. Parsons. He retired on October 31, 1938, but was recalled between December 1941 and January 1942 to serve on the Roberts Commission. McCoy was also recalled from July to August 1942 to serve as president of the military commission during the trial of German saboteurs landed by submarine and from July to October 1943 as chairman of the War Department Procurement Review Board.

== Civilian career ==
After the war, McCoy became the chairman of the Far Eastern Commission, an international body created to determine the fate of postwar Japan. He was also a member of the Pennsylvania Society of the Sons of the Revolution.

== Awards ==
McCoy received the Army Distinguished Service Medal with oak leaf cluster. The citation for his first Army DSM reads:

The President of the United States of America, authorized by Act of Congress, July 9, 1918, takes pleasure in presenting the Army Distinguished Service Medal to Brigadier General Frank Ross McCoy, United States Army, for exceptionally meritorious and distinguished services to the Government of the United States, in a duty of great responsibility during World War I. As Secretary of the General Staff, American Expeditionary Forces, General McCoy's services were of particular value in the original organization of the forces in France. Later, in Command of the 165th Infantry, 42d Division, in the Baccarat sector, and then in Command of the 63d Infantry Brigade in the difficult fighting east of Reims, he had a prominent part in the successes achieved.

The second DSM citation reads:

The President of the United States of America, authorized by Act of Congress, July 9, 1918, takes pleasure in presenting a Bronze Oak Leaf Cluster in lieu of a Second Award of the Army Distinguished Service Medal to Brigadier General Frank Ross McCoy, United States Army, for exceptionally meritorious and distinguished services to the Government of the United States, in a duty of great responsibility. As Personal Representative of the President in Nicaragua and Chairman of the Electoral Board during 1927 and 1928, General McCoy combined to a marked degree the qualities of diplomat and soldier and displayed excellent and sound judgment in a position of great responsibility, conducting a difficult mission with fairness, justice, and tact, thereby commanding the respect of all factions, and acceptance by all political parties of the results of the election, and the free expression of the Nicaraguan people. In connection with our relations with Latin American this outstanding achievement of General McCoy, in the face of seemingly insurmountable obstacles, has brought great credit to himself and the Army of the United States.

For his World War I service, he was made a commander of the Order of the Crown, an honorary companion of the Order of St Michael and St George and an officer of the Legion of Honour. McCoy also received the Croix de Guerre with three palms and the Order of Prince Danilo I.

After retirement, he was conferred honorary doctor of law degrees by Washington & Jefferson College (October 1938), Princeton University (June 1939) and Columbia University (1941).

== Death ==
McCoy died on June 4, 1954, at the Walter Reed Army Medical Center. He was interred at Arlington National Cemetery four days later.

His birthplace, the McCoy House, was added to the National Register of Historic Places in 1973. His papers are held by the Library of Congress.
