= Battle of Siranaya =

- Part of the Moro Rebellion
Date	March 1904
Location	Siranaya, Midsayap, Cotabato
Result	American victory

Belligerents
Buayan	United States

Commanders and leaders
Datu Ali	Leonard Wood

Strength
Several thousand Moro warriors	5 companies artillery battery

The Battle of Siranaya was fought between the Philippines and the United States during the Philippine–American War. Leonard Wood led a force against Datu Ali in the Cotabato Valley in retaliation for refusing to obey an antislavery law. Wood used a force of five companies and an artillery battery with a 3.2 inch piece to attack Ali's cotta and several thousand Moros. The cotta surrendered after two days of American shelling but not before Ali and most of his men fled. The Moros left behind 21 Spanish cannons and 72 lantakas. Secretary of War William Taft criticized Wood afterwards for the excessive use of force and brutality.
