= Datu Bago =

Datu Mama Bago داتو مام بڠو

Datu of Tagloc
- Reign: 1830–1850
- Predecessor: Datu Taup
- Born: Mama Bago c. 1770; Talitay, Sultanate of Buayan
- Died: 15 March 1850 (aged 79–80); Barrio Hijo, Tagum, Davao, Captaincy General of the Philippines
- House: Sultanate of Buayan
- Father: Datu Taup
- Religion: Islam

Datu Mama Bago (1770 – March 15, 1850) (Maguindanaon pronunciation: [daːtʊ maːma baguː]; Jawi:دات مام بڠو) was the Datu of Davao Gulf from 1830 till his death 1850, serving as vassal under the Sultanate of Buayan. Aside from being known to have conquered most of the Davao Gulf area for his domain in the early 19th-century, he was also known for his dogged resistance against the Spanish Empire who went on to conquer his capital settlement of Pinagurasan, now present-day Davao City. He remains a local hero in Davao City for his military exploits, being officially made a historical hero by the City Government of Davao in 2018.
