= Guinakit =

Royal boat used in Mindanao, Philippines

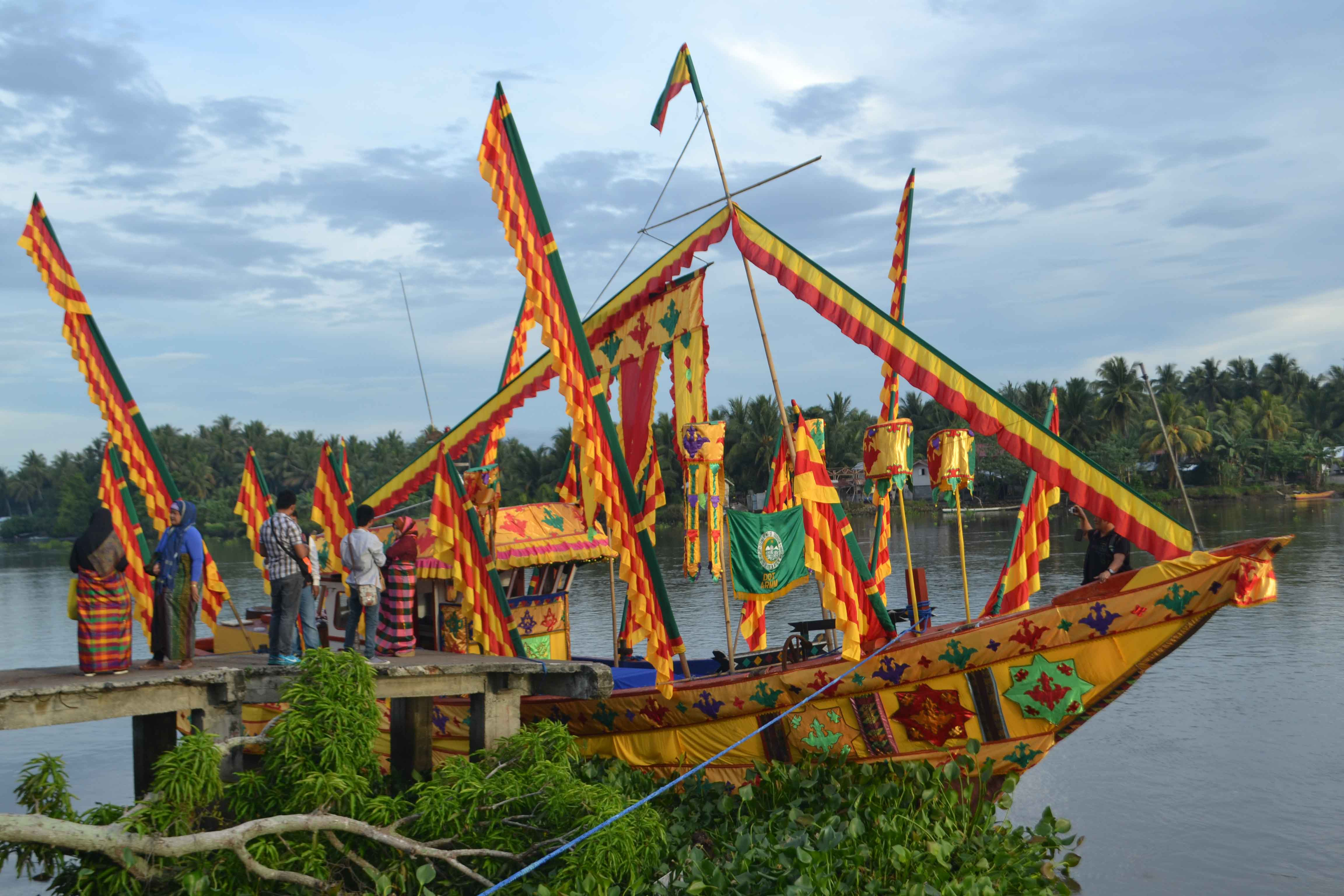
A guinakit

The guinakit, alternatively spelled as ginakit, refers to a Maguindanaon boat which was used by royalty. It was historically used to navigate the coastal and inland waters of Mindanao.

Guinakit comes from the Maguindanaon word for a "convoy of boats".

A fluvial parade of guinakit is customary for the Shariff Kabunsuan Festival which commemorates the arrival of Sharif Kabungsuwan in mainland Mindanao and the introduction of Islam in the area. Kabunsuan, a missionary, is believed to have rode a guinakit. It is also the feature of the Pakaradyan Festival, a festival commemorating the establishment of the town of Malapatan in Sarangani province.

== See also ==
- Balangay
- Vinta
