= Datu Ali =

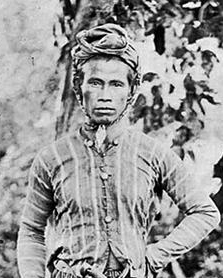

Rajah of Buayan
- Reign: March 1902 – 22 October 1905
- Predecessor: Datu Uto
- Died: October 22, 1905; Malala River, Maguindanao
Names
- Rajamuda Datu Ali bin Sultan Bayao bin Sultan Maitum
- House: Buayan
- Father: Sultan Bayao
- Religion: Sunni Islam

Datu Ali (died 1905) was the Rajahmuda of Tinungkup (alternatively spelled as Tinukop) within the Sultanate of Buayan before succeeding his cousin, Datu Uto, as Rajah of Buayan formally from Uto's death in 1902 until his death in 1905. He was the cousin of Datu Uto of Buayan and brother of Datu Djimbangan and Sultan Tambilawan of Kudarangan, and as a rising leader, Datu Ali overpowered his brothers to rule over Kudarangan.

== History ==
=== Spanish period ===
In 1886, Datu Ali and his cousin Datu Uto refused to honor the Spanish flag and swore to leave no Spaniards alive in Cotabato. Some of Uto's cottas were destroyed by the Spaniards but Spanish troops failed to penetrate the Moro territory. Datu Ali attacked the town of Lepanto near the Spanish fort of Bugcaon, killing fourteen and looting the place as the campaign ended.

The fall of Datu Uto to Spanish advances in 1890 led to his exile. This created a vacuum in the Buayan sultanate that was filled by Datu Ali, Datu Djimbangan and Datu Piang.

Regardless of the fact that Datu Piang had served under Datu Uto as his Minister of Lands, his apparent treachery against Uto by declaring himself the Sultan of Mindanao despite being considered ignoble by the ruling authorities of Buayan, led Datu Uto to turn over the command of his warriors to his cousin Datu Ali.

=== Conquest of Buluan and Talik ===
Buluan was known to have wide expense of fertile plains, and an invigorating climate, which became a subject of interest to Datu Ali, who proceeded to take control of the whole territory. On the other hand, the people of the south, had viewed this luxuriant valley from the top of the mountain ranges at Tupi and Koronadal, under the leadership of Sultan of Talik which is Sultan Sambuto, who decided to explore and take possession of this uninhabited place.

When Datu Ali learned that the Sultan of Talic and his followers encamped in Talic, Datu Ali assembled his men and gave Sultan of Talic battle and easily put him to flight. By his victory, Datu Ali became the most powerful leader in the region between Koronadal in the south and Maganoy in the north. His domain now extended from the neighborhood of Malabang to Sarangani Point.

Datu Ali was then the able ruler of Cotabato upper valley and was considered the paramount leader of the Sultanate of Maguindanao in the early 20th century. Acquiring all of the prerogatives of a legitimate leader, Ali claimed the title "Rajah of Buayan" or "Rajah Buayan".

=== American expedition in Buayan ===
While Datu Djimbangan and Datu Piang conceded to the American colonial establishment in Cotabato, Datu Ali declared that he would not yield to the Americans one iota of his independence, or liberate his slaves, and swore vengeance on all who went in his pursuit. Being the hereditary datu, the inhabitants of the valley generally sympathized with him.

He headed the revolt with some 3,000 followers against the American government through open battle and guerrilla warfare for 3 years, beginning in 1903. In an attempt to coerce Ali to surrender, the American expeditionary forces captured his brother, Datu Djimbangan, at Fort Sar-raya. However, Datu Ali viewed this as an act of deception.

Datu Ali continued to fight until his death on October 22, 1905, when he and most of his men were killed in the Battle of the Malala River after a surprise attack by a provisional company of the 22nd Infantry, led by Captain Frank McCoy, the aide-de-camp of General Leonard Wood. Colonel John White, who spent 15 years as an officer in the Philippine Constabulary, sets the stage with a description of Ali's homeland—the Cotabato district of Mindanao.

Datu Ali was the last, and most formidable Moro chieftain to oppose American rule on the island of Mindanao. For nearly two years, operations against Ali were carried out by several formations of the US Army and the Philippine Constabulary.

== The annual report to the Secretary of War ==
The following passages illustrate the problems the US Army was having with Datu Ali. They are taken from the Annual Reports to the Secretary of War, and indicate encounters with Datu Ali during the year 1904.

- March 5, 1904 - Maj. Gen. Leonard Wood left Cotabato, with a force consisting of Companies K and M, Twenty-third Infantry (Capts. D. B. Devore and W. H. Allaire), Companies B and F, Seventeenth Infantry (Captains Cochran and R. O. Van Horn), Troop B, Fourteenth Cavalry (Capt. G. G. Gatley), and a small detachment of marines and sailors under Commander Coffin on an expedition against the Moros of the Rio Grande Valley, the object being to examine into the alleged war-like and hostile preparations of Datu Ali and his brother Datu Djimbangan, with whom were united many other datus of the Rio Grande Valley.
- March 7, 1904 - General Wood's force operating against the Moros of the Rio Grande Valley, Mindanao, encountered a party of well-armed Moros, who fired on the column, but were quickly dispersed, with a loss of 2 killed and a number wounded. No casualties to General Wood's Command.
- March 10, 1904 - Detachment of 50 men of the Forty-eight Company, Philippine Scouts, under First Lieut. Thomas F. Loudon, accompanied by 1 Officer and 10 men of the Philippine Constabulary, while in pursuit of 2 Moro murderers surprised a band of Moros with the murderers, and in the ensuing engagement 3 Moros were killed and a number wounded; 7 carbines, 2 revolvers, and 400 rounds of ammunition were recovered, and 7 rifles, knives, and spears belonging to the Moros were captured. Casualties, 2 men killed and 1 wounded. The force under General Wood operating in the Rio Grande Valley was reinforced by Companies L and I, Twenty-third Infantry (Capt. M. C. Kerth and First Lieut. H. S. Howland), and Troop A, Fourteenth Cavalry (First Lieut. W. B. Scales), and the fort of Datu Ali having been located, a vigorous bombardment was kept up throughout the day.
- March 11, 1904 - The fort of Datu Ali was captured by General Wood's force, the Moros having abandoned it during the night. Nineteen iron and 2 brass cannon were captured, also 45 lantakas and an immense amount of powder and military projectiles of all kinds. The fort was destroyed.
- March 14, 1904 - General Wood's force returned to Cotabato from its expedition up to the Rio Grande Valley.
- May 8, 1904 - During a reconnaissance to locate the whereabouts of Datu Ali, who had been sending in threatening messages and attempting to stir up trouble, a detachment of 39 enlisted men, Company F, Seventeenth Infantry, was attacked by Moros, near Lake Liguasan, Mindanao, and 2 officers and 13 enlisted men killed, and 6 enlisted men wounded.
- May 16, 1904 - Maj. Gen. Leonard Wood, with 450 officers and men, started on an expedition to recover the bodies of the men killed on May 8 by Moros near Lake Liguasan, Mindanao.
- May 30, 1904 - Maj. Gen. Leonard Wood returned from expedition to Lake Liguasan, Mindanao, with remains of officer and men killed in action on May 8. He reported that Ali with a small aggregation of outlaws were hiding and would be pursued until captured or destroyed. No casualties in expedition.
- June 14, 1904 - The camp of Buluan, Mindanao, was attacked by a force of about 120 Moro under Datu Ali, who were repulsed without loss and driven from the trenches which had been constructed during the night. First Lieut. Frederick S. Young, Twenty-third Infantry, with detachments of Company K, that regiment, and Troop D, Fourteenth Cavalry, was sent in pursuit and encountered the enemy of Malangit. A sharp fight, lasting about forty-five minutes, ensued, when the Moros were put to flight and scattered, with a loss of about 29 killed and wounded. Our casualties, 1 Officer and 2 enlisted men wounded.

== Warfare over slavery ==
When the Moro Province announced the anti-slavery law in the last months of 1903, General Wood and Taft believed that the Maguindanao would continue to follow the lead of colonial progress. Instead, the declaration of abolition destroyed the political and economic system of indirect rule over the whole valley through Datu Piang in Cotabato.

A treaty had been made with the Sultan of Sulu while in Mindanao there were different sultans who claimed headships in their own districts, and one of them was Datu Ali, who waged a long and successful war with the Spaniards. A difficult problem for the Americans to establish civil government among hill tribes, Filipino settlements, and piratical Mohammedan groups each with fears and hate one another.

Warfare over slavery began in March and April 1904, when Datu Ali, led his followers to battle in the northern half of the Pulangi River Valley, the sa-raya (upper valley) region that had supported the late Datu Uto's resistance against the Spaniards in 1899. Slave parties were active and tribes in Mindanao were raided and oppressed; there were violence and disorders everywhere. The sultan of Sulu, Jamalul Kiram II, was defeated by his subordinate datus. Meanwhile, the sultan of Maguindanao, Datu Mangigin, fled from the Cotabato valley in fear of his rival Datu Ali and was a refugee in Dumankilas Bay. Such condition could not be ignored, and it was felt that American authority must be exerted.

Datu Piang, on the other hand used his political skill and control of long-distance trade through the Chinese merchants of Cotabato to bring the other major datus of the valley into an accommodation with the United States. Upon Datu Uto's declined in power, Datu Ali, the heir to the Sultanate of Buayan, emerged as the dominant leader of the sa-raya region. He assembled the most powerful armed men expert in guerrilla warfare and constructed the largest and most heavily armed Kota in Mindanao in preparation for the American resistance.

The governor of Cotabato district knew through his reliable intelligence that Mastura, son of the last sultan of Maguindanao and the sultan of Talakuku and several allied datus including the important Datu Ampatuan pledge d that if they would have to give up their slaves, they would rather fight and join Datu Ali. With Datu Ali's efforts to recruit support from the Lake Lanao Region, several thousand followers had congregated in Ali's great kota to revolt against American rule. Datu Ali married Datu Piang's daughter, bonding their alliance in ties of kinships. The ending of slave trade resulted in many heavy, long-drawn-out fights with the principal Moro Band of Mindanao.

== American expedition in the Pulangi River Valley ==
=== The Pulangi River ===
In early March 1904, General Leonard Wood led a large military expedition up the Pulangi River against Ali. At Kudarangan, General Wood consulted with Datu Piang (an influential political leader and informant who, as convenient, shared information with "both sides"), who described Datu Ali's war preparations and intention to resist the implementation of the antislavery law in Maguindanao. An Arab priest with Datu Piang Sherif Tuan also stated that the Moros Datus pledge to fight and obeisance that they would not submit to any interference with their slave trading and holding.

In May 1904, Datu Ali ambushed seventeenth Infantry killing two officers and seventeen men. Later, about forty soldiers headed by an officer who is ignorant of the terrain and local language, guided by faithless moro. They hiked through the trackless swamps leading their men into the heart of an unexplored territory. The trail led through high Tigbao grass, black mud of a churned-up trail with occasional holes where the men sanks to their waists. They penetrated seven miles into the heart of the territory of Datu Ali's best general - Bapa ni Manakup also known as Sharif Mangacop - The son of Sharif Ampatuan from his first wife Bai Idsad.

While officers moving forward, a sudden spurt of rifle fired from killing men and dying in the stinking mud. They withdrew in disorder while the victorious Moros completed their work by beheading and disemboweling the head of dying Americans with their vicious kris and barong. Yet, even then Datu Ali showed some spark of noble warfare. The two captured American soldiers were cared for and later freed and returned to Cotabato. The ambush where later called and known to Americans as "the Simpetan Massacre" – A blood little affair, campaigning against hostile Moros in the part of Mindanao.

As time passed by, a soldiers developed a grudging respect of their prey. Unable to truck down the elusive datu, General Wood tried to negotiate Datu Ali to surrender. Dr. Najeeb Mitry Saleeby, a former member of Wood's Legislative Council and Ali's old acquaintances, could not convince Datu Ali to surrender. Instead, Datu Ali wrote a defiant letter addressing Wood "Which is better for you, to kill me or not?... Until I Die all the people will not submit to the government, because I will try to kill the people who are friends to Americans." Reasons for General Wood to declare war against Datu Ali and his followers as a struggle against slavery and "lawlessness". General Wood responded the following day by posting a $500 reward for Datu Ali's capture, dead or alive.

General Wood's analysis of Ali's rebellion reinterpreted the recent history of Maguindanao to suit his identification of abolition with progress, civilization, and colonial authority. Failure to punish Ali will only leave the Moros with an undue sense of their importance to obey either the Civil Governor of the District or any other Authority.”

While Datu Ali and his followers is still actively engaged in slave-hunting among the hill tribes, General Wood believes that Ali and his followers "the Moros" were still wild people, who is not yet properly conquered, discipline and colonize outside their selves. With General Wood's condemnation of Moros, he knew that the antislavery law will provoke a great deal of opposition among the Moro Datus especially Datu Ali and Datu Djimbangan who was making a good deal of money in slave trading.

Antislavery law ignited their general contempt for American Authority. General Wood also reported that all of the Datus were united to resist the American rule for the operation of the slave law except Datu Piang. General Wood believed that Datu Ali's death could serve as the elimination of the only obstacles to "progress". The American hatched a Series of assassination attempt killing Datu Ali was initiated including using his nephew, the son of Datu Djimbangan but with no luck.

=== The Battle of the Malala River ===
On October 5, 1905, Captain Frank Ross McCoy of the 3rd Cavalry, and aide de camp to General Wood, formed the above Provisional Company consisting of volunteers from the 22nd Infantry, specifically to go after the Moro chieftain called the Datu Ali, who was The Last Major Chieftain to oppose American sovereignty on the island of Mindanao. Datu Ali consistently raided local villages, conducted hit and run attacks on US camps, and continued his campaign of insurrection through terror and fear. In September 1905, General Wood received intelligence that Datu Ali was encamped on his ranch deep in the mountains along the Malola (now known as Malala) River.

Due to Datu Ali's stubborn resistance to the Americans, Datu Piang convinced many of his fellow datus to end their support to Datu Ali and were no longer willing to put up with the misery and devastation that had been visited upon them. They wanted it ended before the unpredictable and vengeful General Wood returned. Piang had tipped off Captain McCoy that Datu Ali, was hiding out in a cabin near Lake Buluan within his large family and had sent most of his men back to their villages. This information had been relayed from Sharif Afdal, a religious leader, who had recently visited him due to sickness. Of equal importance, Datu Inuk (also known as Inog), a sworn enemy of Datu Ali and Tomas Torres, the long-time head scout for the Americans in Mindanao, volunteered to accompany and guide Captain McCoy to Datu Ali's location to identify him in person since the few Americans who could recognize him at sight were no longer stationed in the Philippines.

General Wood ordered that an assault force be raised to find and apprehend Datu Ali. A large number of volunteers arose from the Regiment for the dangerous assignment, and from those volunteers Captain F. R. McCoy hand-picked 100 men provisional company from the 22nd Infantry Regiment, stationed at Camp Keithley in Lanao in secret; so as not to alert the residents of Cotabato that an operation was underway. They sailed on October 11 from Iligan to the small town of Digos on Davao Gulf with a short stopover in Zamboanga. Picking up two squads of Philippine Scouts, McCoy's party force-marched fifty miles across the high route he had traveled the year before, skirting the flanks of the impressive Mt. Apo, the highest mountain in the Philippines. As they descended into the valley, it was decided to leave the lame and exhausted behind, reducing the expedition to 77 men.

The Company traveled by boat to Digos, on the coast of Davao Gulf. Upon landing on the October 16, they were joined by 10 Filipino Scouts and began the hazardous journey into the interior. They crossed the jungle covered mountains in five days, reaching Datu Ali's encampment in the early morning hours of October 22. Quickly and quietly, they surrounded the ranch buildings and waited. As the sun rose, Datu Ali and a dozen of his men came out of the main house unsuspecting and unarmed.

Lieutenant Philip Remington sent one squad forward and another around to the rear of the house. Datu Ali ran back inside and armed himself and began firing at the Americans. A bullet just missed Lieutenant Remington but hit and killed Private Bobbs. Remington then charged into the house firing his pistol, hitting Datu Ali and knocking the man down. Staggering to his feet, Datu Ali ran through the back door, only to be cut down by a hail of bullets from the waiting second squad.

With the death of Datu Ali, organized insurrection on a major scale ended. Oral tradition asserts that the Americans obtained Piang's assistance only by torturing him. The campaign against Datu Ali closed with the death of the Maguindanao chief who was betrayed by his own men. Datu Piang then reigned supreme in the valley, conciliating American officials with gifts of brass, chicken, and eggs. The opportunist merchant chief lives with prosper.

Nevertheless, as Beckett points out, "Ali's death saw Datu Piang on the winning side, the authorities in his debt, and his aristocratic rival out the way". Datu Piang then appointed as Muslim Provincial Board Member in Cotabato and in the following year appointed to the National Assembly by the American governor-general. The two positions with few formal responsibilities with virtually no legal authority.

Though armed resistance would continue by several Moro Leaders over the next six years, the major battles and campaigns of the Insurrection could now be considered to be over. Yet, when Maguindanao Moros gather for the rice planting or harvest, songs are sung and tales are told of Datu Ali -last, and perhaps not the least noble, of the Maguindanao chief. Even the brave American General Wood who became the Governor General of the Philippines at that time testified to the bravery of Rajamuda Datu Ali by saying "by far the most capable Moro we have run into".

== See also ==
- List of Sunni Muslim dynasties
- American Occupation of the Philippines
- Insular Government
- United States military government of the Philippine Islands
