= Datu Uto =

18th Sultan of Buayan

Datu Utto
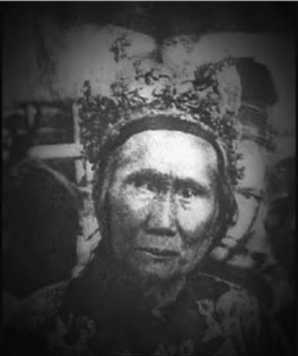

Sultan of Buayan
- Reign: 1875–1902
- Predecessor: Sultan Bayao
- Successor: Datu Ali; Datu Djimbangan; Datu Piang
- Born: Unknown; Sapakan, Buayan
- Died: March 1902; Sapakan, Buayan
- Spouse: Rajah Putri Bai-labi
Names
- Anwarud-din Uto; Utto Anwaruddin
- House: Buayan
- Father: Sultan Bangon Marajanun Sa Didagen
- Mother: Tuan Bai Sa Buayan
- Religion: Sunni Islam

Datu Uto (reigned: 1875–1902), also known as Sultan Anwarud-din Utto or Sultan Utto Anwaruddin, alternatively spelled as Datu Utto, was the 18th Sultan of Buayan, one of the major sultanates of Mindanao. As a military leader he distinguished himself in many battles against the Spanish.

== Early life and career ==
Datu Uto was born Anwarud-din Uto to Sultan Bangon Marajanun Sa Didagen and Tuan Bai Sa Buayan. During his father's reign as sultan Uto led a force of 500 men sent as assistance to the Spaniards against Talayan rebels in 1864. This included the four guides who escorted the combined force headed by Colonel La Hoz, Governor of Cotabato. However, instead of helping the Spaniards, he went against his father's orders and sided with the Talayan datu (ruler). Although inferior in numbers and equipment, the Spaniards having the advantage of possessing artillery, they triumphed and chased the Spaniards as far as Taviran.

It was during this battle that he lost his eye, earning himself the title "one-eyed man", but he became a recognized leader in Buayan as a result. Sultan Bayao, Bangon's brother, succeeded to the throne upon his father's death in 1872. Nevertheless, Uto succeeded as sultan three years later.

== History ==
=== Rise to power ===
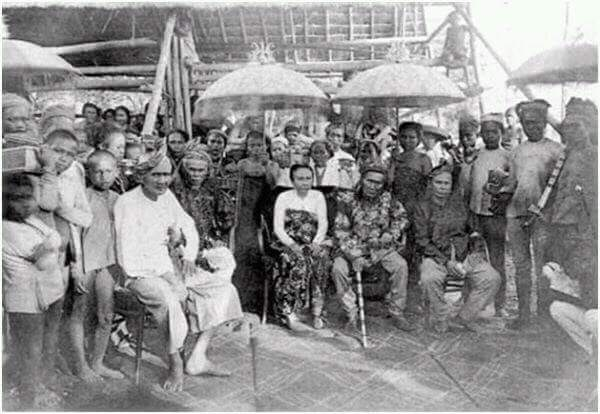
Uto with his wife, Rajah Putri, in center.

Uto ruled Buayan from the inland town of Sapakan. He married the daughter of Maguindanao's Sultan Qudratullah Untong, Rajah Putri Bai-labi. In 1874, he joined forces with Sultan Jamal ul-Azam, the Sultan of Sulu, to take the offensive against the Spanish. Evidently, Sulu needed the slave shipments Uto had been able to provide. In the same year he stated in a letter to the Governor of Mindanao, Colonel Carraga, that he has a large contingent to accompany him, which included at least 18 datus and 600 men. At the peak of his power he had as many as 5,000 slaves.

In turn, the Spanish attacked Bakat, Buayan's major stronghold (cota or kuta), and occupied it. However, Uto was able to regain the stronghold and force the Spanish to sign a peace accord in May 1875. The leaders of the Pulangi River Basin gravitated towards Uto's leadership, and this enabled them to keep the Spanish at bay. Included in the areas where Uto's influence grew were Talayan, Buluan, and Tumbao. The Spanish recognised his "ingenuity in manipulating friendships and debt relationships to suit his ends." He solidified his alliances by friendship and marriage. For instance, he had a total of 60 wives.

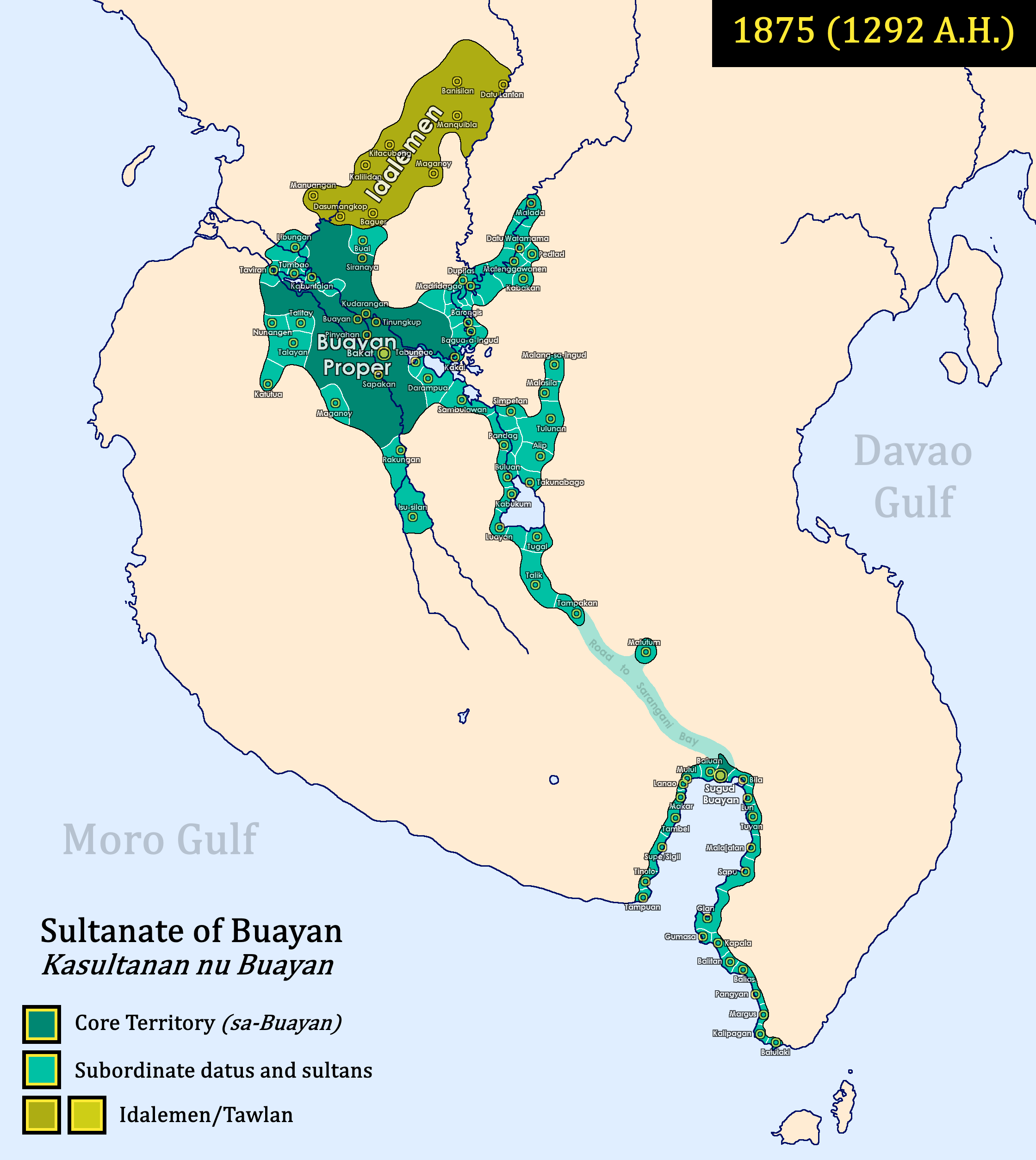
The map of the maximum extent of Datu Uto's territory as the Sultan of Buayan, with the core territory being Bakat, within modern-day Rajah Buayan, near Uto's homeland of Sapakan.

While keeping his administration small, mainly composed of a council, it was his personality which built a coalition with the neighboring leaders. His domain extended from Lake Buluan to Sarangani Bay. However, to conceal his true rank as sultan, Sultan Tambilawan (Sultan Bayao's son and Uto's cousin) was installed as the titular "Sultan of Buayan", even though Tambilawan was Sultan of Kudarangan, a sultanate within Buayan. This caused Buayan to retain the title of datu, a strategy aimed to confuse the Spaniards as to who was the real ruler of Buayan.

=== Continued warfare ===
Peace did not last long. The new Governor-General of the Philippines, José Malcampo, 3rd Marquis of San Rafael, renewed the military campaigns in Mindanao. In 1876, the Spanish captured Jolo. The following year, the Spanish were able to convince the sultans of Cotabato and Tumbao to make an alliance against Buayan. Nevertheless, due to the signed peace accord, the Spanish did not dare to venture into Buayan itself. Due to this success, Malcampo was granted the victory titles of Count of Jolo and Viscount of Mindanao. On 20 July 1878, Sultan Jamal ul-Azam signed a treaty recognizing Spanish sovereignty, but the Tausug made an issue of testing the limits of the treaty. By 1880 other sultanates began to emerge in the Pulangi River Basin. With this development, Uto made plans to defend the area against the Spanish. The Tausug and the Chinese began to supply him with arms in exchange for slaves. In particular, Buayan began to receive Enfield and Spencer rifles, as well as assorted pistols.

The Spanish began to see in him the making of the next Muhammad Kudarat. Therefore in 1885 the succeeding Governor-General, Emilio Terrero y Perinat, launched yet another military offensive in Mindanao, personally leading the Spanish forces. This prompted Federico Roldan, Governor of Cotabato, to attack Buayan. In 1886, two Spanish corps under General Serina razed Bakat to make way for the construction of a new fort and a railway from Iligan to Lake Lanao. The project was abandoned as Uto's forces harassed the Spaniards, gathering the metal used in construction to produce krises. Nevertheless, it was apparent that Uto would not dare to take the offensive.

Attempting to break Buayan's defenses, the Spaniards utilized artillery. While managing to destroy some strongholds, it was not enough to open up Uto's territory. Nevertheless, his followers began to fall to the Spanish offensive. Among them were Datu Kambing, Datu Kaliz, and the Sultan of Talayan. Sultan Tambilawan also pledged loyalty to the Spanish. On 10 March 1887, Uto signed a peace treaty imposed by the Spaniards. By 1888, his allies defected, and his prestige was lost. Nevertheless, when the military campaigns of the Spanish ended, Uto remained unconquered.

== Later life and death ==
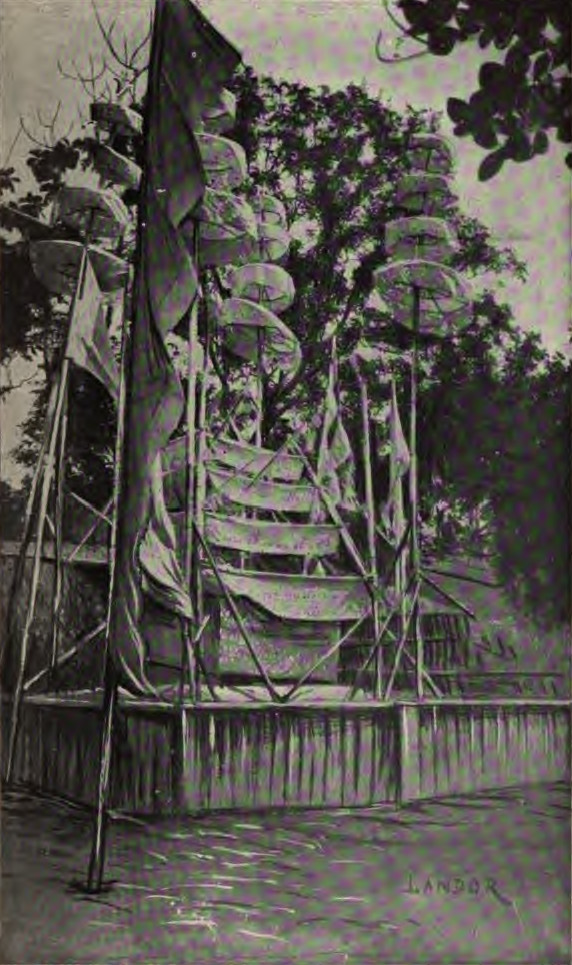
Tomb of Datu Uto, c.1904

While he had lost most of the influence he possessed prior to 1888, Uto remained strong in local politics and tried to gain the title of sultan (a title he never used at the peak of his power). For instance, from 1888 to 1896, the Sultanate of Maguindanao had no sultan. While it is apparent that Uto wanted to be sultan of the two sultanates of Buayan and Maguindanao, he backed his brother-in-law, Datu Mamaku, to take the vacant position in Maguindanao. Meanwhile, the Spanish wanted to place as sultan a Sibugay datu allied to them. Sultan Mangigin succeeded as sultan in 1896.

Despite the American occupation of the Philippines, Uto remained a powerful figure in the area until 1899. He had disappeared from the political scene by 1900, and Uto died two years later. Nevertheless, he was recorded as having met William Howard Taft, Governor-General of the Philippines from 1901 to 1903. His wife married Mangigin in 1906. His unofficial successors continued their resistance, this time against the Americans. Among his former companions who would resist American rule in Mindanao were Datu Ali and Datu Djimbangan. Another successor, Datu Piang, would prefer to cooperate with the Americans. In the process, he crowned himself Sultan of Mindanao, much to the dismay of Uto. Piang formerly served as a minister of Datu Uto.

== Datu Uto's ancestry ==
Ancestors of Datu Uto

8. Sultan Muhammad Alimudin Paki Maulana
4. Sultan Maguindanao Sa Buayan
2. Sultan Bangon Marajanun Sa Didagen
5. Bai Mayong
1. Sultan Anwarud-din Uto
6. Rajah Twa sa Maguindanao
3. Tuan Bai Sa Buayan
7. Putri Kabayan bint Rajah Buayan Alimuddin

== See also ==
- Sultanate of Buayan
- Rajah Buayan, Maguindanao del Sur
- Sultanate of Maguindanao
- Datu Ali
- List of Sunni Muslim dynasties
