= Najeeb Mitry Saleeby =

Lebanese American physician

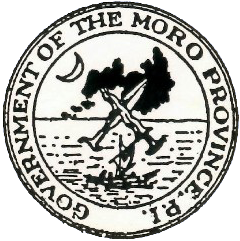
Moro Province Government Seal

Najeeb Mitry Saleeby (1870–1935) was a Lebanese-American physician who served the U.S. colonial occupation of the Philippines and who became an expert on and advocate for the Muslim population of the region. He held positions as the Assistant Chief of the Bureau of Non-Christian Tribes, Superintendent of Schools, and Captain and Assistant Surgeon of the US Volunteers. He became a premier expert on the Moros, Muslim peoples from the islands of Mindanao and Sulu. Through his medical profession, advocacy for bilingual education, and critique of American imperialism, he dedicated his career to advancing Filipino welfare. He spent most of his adulthood in the Philippines and died in Baguio in 1935.

== Early life and education ==
Najeeb Saleeby was born in 1870 in the village of Suq al-Gharb in Lebanon to Joseph Shaheen Saleeby (1842–1927) and Shahinie Saleeby (born 1860). He came from an Orthodox Christian family which converted to Protestantism under the influence of American missionaries. He attended the Syrian Protestant College (now the American University of Beirut) and graduated with a Bachelor's degree from the School of Arts and Sciences in 1888. He continued his graduate studies at the same institution and became an instructor of medicine, where he developed skills as a surgeon and administrator, in addition to having roles as an educator, historian, scientist, linguist, and ethnologist.

In 1896, he emigrated to New York City to complete his physician training at the Belleview Hospital Medical College, an institution founded in 1861 which evolved to become part of what is now the New York University Grossman School of Medicine. He participated in an internship at Brooklyn Hospital in 1898 and enlisted as a contract assistant surgeon in the American army during the Spanish-American War. He was posted in Cuba at Camp Columbia for a year and a half, during which he gained experience conducting anatomical research on tropical diseases.

In 1912, Saleeby married Elizabeth Gibson, an American woman from Texas who had graduated with a degree in nursing from Boston City Hospital, and who became a nurse and teacher in the Philippines. While Saleeby was in the Philippines, he invited four of his brothers to join him. His brother Murad Saleeby, who went to the Philippines in 1906, had been head of the American Mission School in Lebanon. Murad became an expert on tropical agronomy, and served as chief of the Fibre Division of the U.S. Bureau of Agriculture from 1913 to 1917 before founding in 1926 a business called Saleeby Fibre Company. His brother Amin Saleeby earned a medical degree from Jefferson Medical College in Philadelphia and then joined Najeeb in the Philippines in 1907. He worked for the Bureau of Health and then became a private physician. His brother Fuad Saleeby became a clerk in the U.S. Bureau of Public Works in 1910 and later, with Murad, bought a coal mine which Japanese forces seized during World War II. Finally, his brother Illiya (Elijah) Saleeby worked as a pharmacist. He also had a brother Joseph Saleeby (1883-1965), who settled in Brooklyn and later North Carolina, and a sister, Martha Saleeby.

== Service with the U.S. Government in the Philippines ==
After completing his medical internship in New York, Najeeb Saleeby enlisted in the U.S. military in 1898 as a contract assistant surgeon. His first deployment was to Cuba, where he was posted to Camp Columbia for a year and a half, conducting autopsies and anatomical research in the field of tropical diseases. Next, Saleeby deployed to the Philippines as a Captain and Assistant Surgeon in the U.S. Volunteers in 1900 during the Filipino-American War. Finding himself posted among the Muslims of Sulu and Mindanao, he drew upon his knowledge of Arabic writing and Muslim practice (developed during his years growing up in Lebanon) to help his American superiors gain an initial understanding of local customs and culture. He was quickly reassigned from army surgeon to ethnographer.

In February 1903, Saleeby received an honorable discharge in the Philippines but then received a succession of civilian appointments in the Philippines in the Bureau of Non-Christian Tribes, the Bureau of Moro Affairs, the Office of the Superintendent of Schools, and other departments of the American regime of occupation. In 1903, Saleeby aided in ethnographically surveying the Philippines. One of his largest contributions during his time in the Philippines was developing Moro and bilingual education. Saleeby hired Arabs and Moros to create schoolbooks in the Moro languages of Sulu and Magindanaon. He himself studied not only two local languages – Magindanaon and Tausug. He also convinced the school Executive Council to allow pupils to study the Qur’an so that Moro children would be able to understand, rather than solely read, the Arabic text. In August of the same year, Governor-General William Howard Taft made him the Superintendent of Schools in the new Moro province, and in 1905, he spoke about the Moros at a superintendent convention in Manila.

Saleeby’s political career as an officer in the American administration eventually ended because of his disagreement with the direction of U.S. policies in the region and the American treatment of the local populations. He rejected the idea in his writings that the Muslims of the Philippines were savages and religious fanatics, and maintained that the U.S. government should be working more closely and collaboratively with local Moro elites. His role as Superintendent of Schools had been limited by Act 1283 passed by the Philippines Commission, which led him to tender his resignation effective on June 30, 1906. Saleeby then moved to Manila, where many of his family members eventually joined him.

In 1908, Saleeby contributed a variety of manuscripts and artifacts, such as weapons and brainwork, to the Philippine National Museum. These included tarsilas (family genealogies tracing migrations and conversions to Islam), and law codes (called Luwaran) as well as other materials showing Islam’s impact on the Mindanao island.

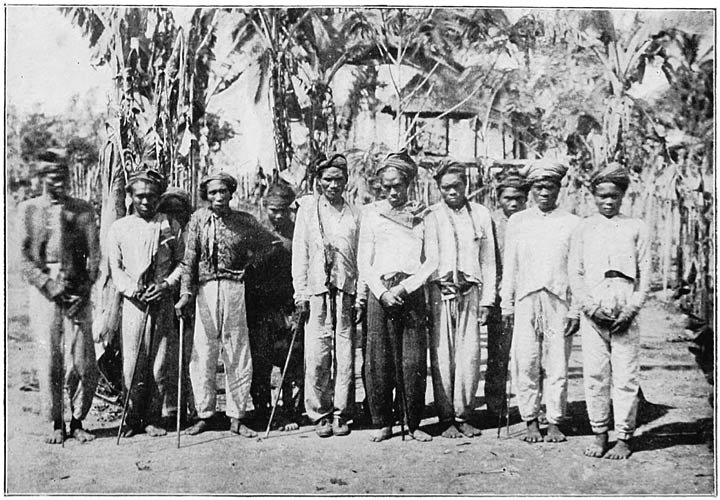
Moros of the Bay of Moro (1900, Philippines)

== Expertise in the Moros & publications ==
Saleeby devoted significant time to understanding the lives of the Moro people in the Philippines. He persistently sought out Moro manuscript sources that provided insights on subjects including their migration patterns, legal system, history, and religion. Among these documents were 33 Moro manuscripts, which he translated into English and, in 1908, sold to the Philippine Museum in Manila. Saleeby’s proficiency in the Moro language enabled him to accurately interpret and translate these sources. In 1905, Saleeby also published a book, Studies in Moro History, Law, and Religion, that was lauded for shedding light on more “real knowledge” and providing an “accurate understanding” of Moro history and customs.

== Legacies ==
In 2004, the U.S. embassy in Manila dedicated part of its compound as the “Najeeb Saleeby Courtyard” to recognize Saleeby’s important contributions to promoting understanding between American and Filipino, and Christian and Muslim, peoples. The embassy uses the courtyard for cultural events including musical performances and banquets.

In 2018, the Filipino researcher, Renan Laru-an, who originally comes from Mindanao, curated an exhibit at the Sharjah Art Foundation that included a feature on the life and career of Najeeb Saleeby. Called A Tripoli Agreement, the show focused primarily on relations between Southeast Asia and the Middle East vis-a-vis travel and networks. The exhibit commemorated Saleeby as an expert on the Muslim culture of the Moro people whose scholarship “has provided an alternative to the Spanish and American discourse of twentieth-century Philippine history.”

In an assessment of his career, the anthropologist Thomas McKenna concluded that Najeeb Saleeby envisioned and called for the ethnogenesis of "Morohood", which would entail a unified Filipino Muslim identity. McKenna also suggested that his ideas had a substantial impact on U.S. practice in the region even if American officials did not formally recognize or follow his policy suggestions. The historian Timothy Marr noted that Saleeby’s writings show “the contradictions between Saleeby’s paternalistic investment in the ideology of progressive uplift and his deep sympathy for the injustices experienced by the Moros at the hands of their supposed [American] civilizers.” Marr also suggested that Saleeby’s life and career in U.S.-occupied Philippines reflected the challenges that Syrian or Lebanese muhajirs (migrants) faced in their search for acceptance vis-a-vis American elites in this period, as well as their ambiguous status of Arab Americans.
