= Datu Piang =

Maguindanaon-Chinese ruler (c. 1846–1933)

Datu Piang Piang Tan / Tan Sim Ping دات ڤياڠ 大都皮昂
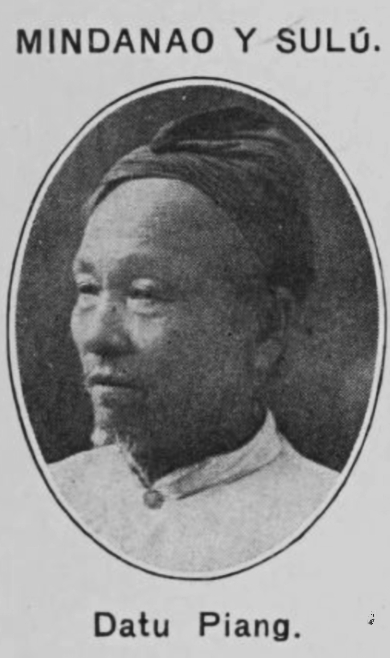
- Datu Piang as member of the House of Representatives, c. 1921

Member of the House of Representatives of the Philippine Islands from Department of Mindanao and Sulu's Lone District
- In office 1916–1922 Serving with Rafael Acuña Villaruz, Isidro Vamenta, Julius Schuck, Teodoro Palma Gil, Datu Benito, Datu Tampugao, and Pablo Lorenzo
- Appointed by: Francis Burton Harrison

Sultan of Mindanao
- Reign: 6 January – December 1899
- Born: 1846; Kuta Watu, Sultanate of Maguindanao
- Died: August 24, 1933 (aged 86–87); Cotabato, Insular Government of the Philippine Islands
- Father: Tuya Tan 陳名頓 (POJ: Tân Bêng-tùn) / 陳頓仔 (POJ: Tân Tùiⁿ-á)
- Mother: Tiko
- Religion: Islam

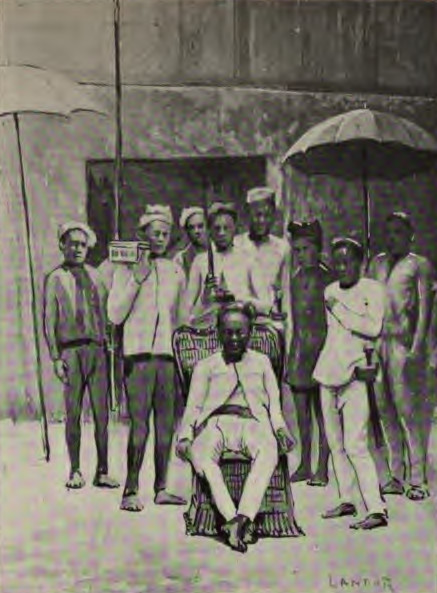
Datu Piang in 1904

Piang Tan (Maguindanaon pronunciation: [daːtʊ pɪjaːŋ]; 1846–1933) a Maguindanaon-Chinese ruler, popularly known as Datu Piang, is often referred to as the Grand Old Man of Cotabato. He was one of the most powerful rulers in Maguindanao from the end of Spanish rule to the arrival of American forces in late 1899.

Sometimes referred to as Amai Mingka, he was recognized as the undisputed Moro leader in Central Mindanao when the United States Army occupied and administered what was then referred to as "Moroland".

== History ==
=== Minister of Lands in Buayan ===
Datu Piang was the appointed Minister of Lands by Datu Uto of the Sultanate of Buayan. However, according to oral tradition, many of Datu Uto's followers defected him for Piang, as Datu Uto refused to open his granaries to his people during a time of famine. This apparent blunder by Datu Uto helped Piang gain a large following in the Buayan mainland, which eventually culminated into his usurpation of power.

=== Coup d'etat and the end of Spanish rule ===
In January 1899, Datu Piang, accompanied by a thousand warriors betrayed Datu Uto and established his headquarters on the old Buayan capital, now renamed Dulawan, as well as capturing another Buayanen capital of Bacat, forcing Datu Uto to transfer back to Sapakan. On the 6th day of the same month, Piang overthrew the Spanish garrison in Cotabato and Tamontaka and granted himself the title of 'Sultan of Mindanao'. It was after this event that the Spaniards finalized their evacuation from the entirety of Mindanao except for Zamboanga and Jolo. This left Datu Uto frustrated as Datu Piang became a rival of Buayan.

=== American colonial period ===
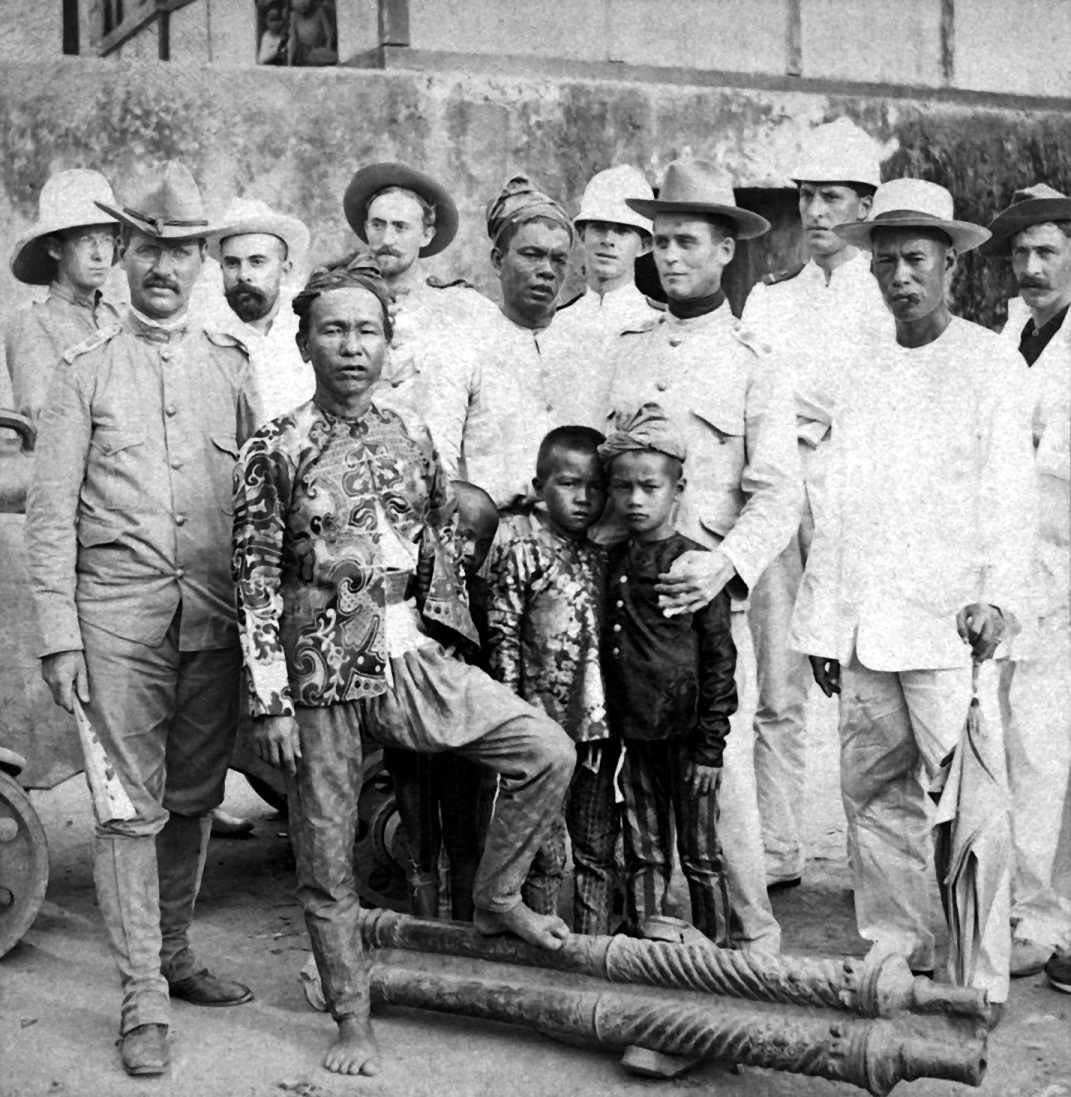
Datu Piang (fourth from left) with American officers, 1899.

American forces landed on Cotabato in December 1899. Piang greeted American rule and saw it as a means to maintain his power in the Cotabato region. However, in spite of this, the Moro resistance would be organized by Datu Ali of Buayan, but would be fully suppressed by American expeditionary forces in 1905. With Datu Ali gone, Piang has lost any potential local rival that could threaten his authority and would continue to collaborate with the American civil government.

== Personal life ==
Born of a Hokkien Sangley Chinese merchant named Tuya Tan (陳名頓; Pe̍h-ōe-jī: Tân Bêng-tùn) from Amoy, China and a Maguindanaon woman identified as "Tiko" (Philippine Hokkien Chinese: 豬哥; Pe̍h-ōe-jī: ti-ko; lit. 'Muslim'). He was a Mix Chinese - Maguindanaon due to his Maguindanaon and Hokkien Sangley Chinese admixture.

Datu Piang's son by his sixth wife, Polindao, was Datu Gumbay Piang, who led the Moro-Bolo Battalion to fight against the Japanese during their occupation of Mindanao in World War II.

== See also ==
- History of the Philippines (1898–1946)
- United States Military Government of the Philippine Islands
- Insular Government of the Philippine Islands
