= Sultanate of Buayan =

1350–1905 state in Southeast Asia

Sultanate of Buayan كسولتانن نو بواين Kasultanan nu Buayan
- c.1390–1905
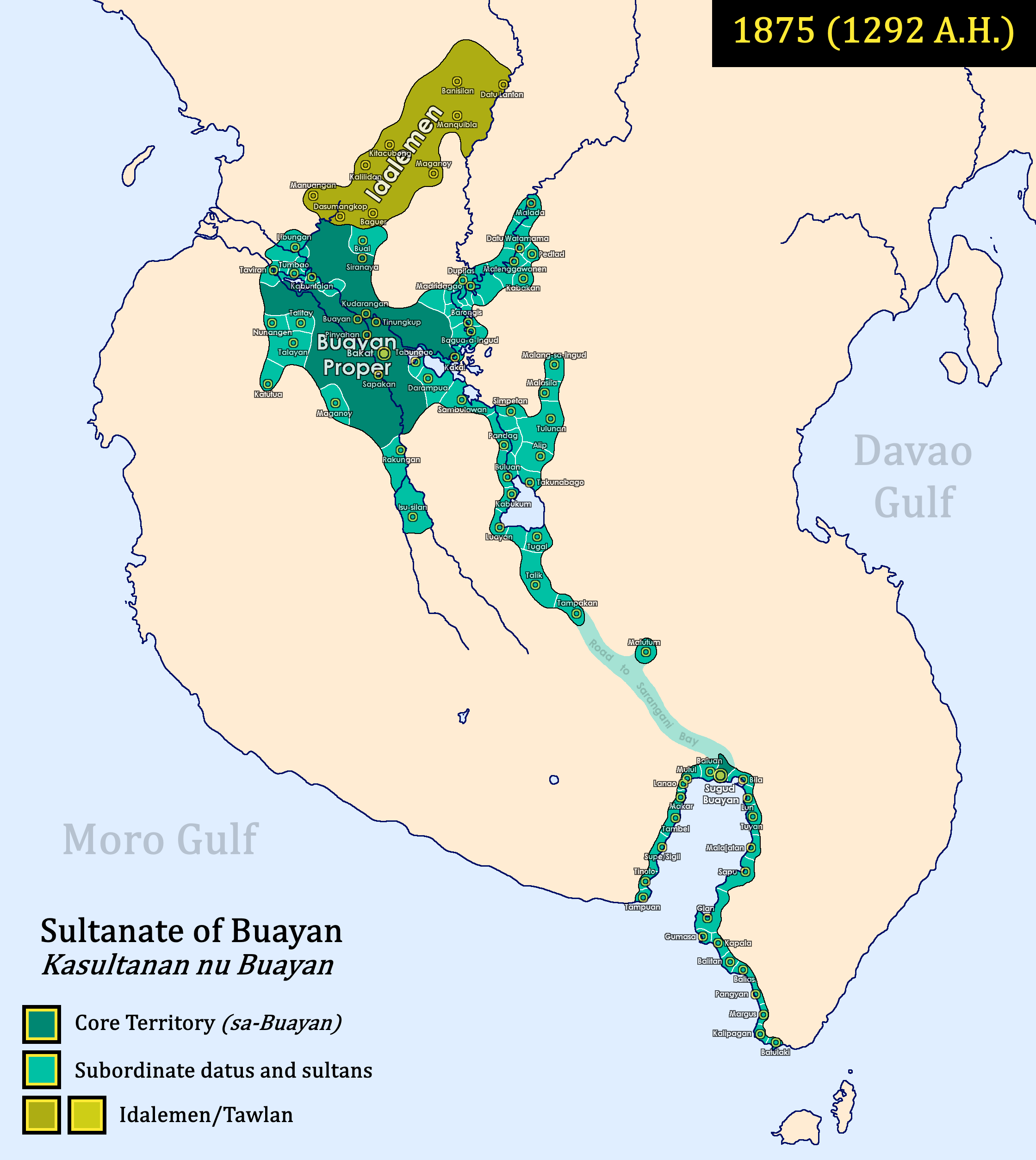
- The territorial map of the Sultanate of Buayan in 1875 during the reign of Datu Uto.
- Capital: Buayan (1390–c.1860); Bacat (c.1860–1872; 1875–1899); Kudarangan (1872–1875); Tinungkup (1899–1905)
- Common languages: Maguindanaon, Iranun, Sangil, Teduray, Manobo languages, and Blaan
- Religion: Islam
- Demonym: Buayanen
- Government: Absolute monarchy
- Sultan/Datu/Rajah
  - c.1390-1400s: Mamu
  - c.1400s: Budtul
  - c.1400s–1500s: Malang-sa-Inged
  - 1596–1627: Silongan
  - 1875–1899: Uto
  - 1899–1905: Ali
- History
  - Established by Datu Mamu: c.1390
  - Arrival of Rajah Baguinda Ali: c.1390
  - Reign of Datu Uto: 1875–1899
  - Rise of Datu Ali: 1899–1905
  - Battle of the Malala River: 1905
- Currency: Barter
Preceded by	Succeeded by
Kiliman	Insular Government of the Philippines; Moro Province
- Today part of: Philippines

The Sultanate of Buayan (Maguindanaon: Kasultanan nu Buayan, Jawi: كسولتانن نو بواين; Filipino: Sultanato ng Buayan) was a Muslim state on the island of Mindanao in the southern Philippines from the late 14th to the 20th century. Buayan was one of the four major sultanates in Mindanao, other sultanates being the Sultanate of Sulu, the Sultanate of Maguindanao, and the Confederate States of Lanao. Being the primary power in the upper Cotabato valley, it had access to an abundance of fertile land as well as raw materials, transforming into an agricultural powerhouse in contrast to Maguindanao. In addition, despite its status as an interior sultanate, Buayan was able to conduct maritime trade and diplomacy either through the Pulangi River mouth, or its port in Sarangani. At its maximum extent, its territory stretched from modern-day Kabuntalan to Sarangani Bay.

Buayan was also well known for its long rivalry with Maguindanao, often using its alliance with Spain to weaken its rival and usurp the throne in Cotabato, as well as to monopolize on the trade, influence, and tribute from its weaker subjects over mainland Mindanao.

Its rulers, often referred to as the "Rajah Buayan" indicates a pre-existing Indianized form of governance in the region, already headed by a Rajah.

The Sultanate of Buayan ceased to exist as a sovereign entity following the death of Datu Ali, cousin of Datu Uto of Buayan, after being killed in the Battle of the Malala River on 22 October 1905 against American forces. The American colonial administration was able to assert its authority with the aid of Datu Piang, the assumed ruler of Cotabato.

== Etymology ==
The name came from the Maguindanaon root word buaya, which means 'crocodile'. Therefore, the term Buayan meant 'place full of crocodiles'. Alternatively, the Spaniards sometimes referred to Buayan as Buhayen.

== Territory ==
Buayan was centered in what is now Datu Piang, Maguindanao del Sur in the Cotabato Basin, created by the Rio Grande de Mindanao (or Pulangi) River, 30 km upstream from the Sultanate of Maguindanao.

Buayan held great influence over the datus of the interior through political marriages and alliances. Both the Maguindanao and Buayan sultanates competed for dominance.

Apart from the Cotabato Basin, the Sultanate of Buayan also had a port in Sarangani Bay which was used for its maritime trade.

Throughout the dominance of the Sultanate of Buayan in the Cotabato Basin, there were several sultanates that gained prominence as one of the most powerful vassals of Buayan:

- Sultanate of Kabuntalan/Tumbao
- Sultanate of Kudarangan-sa-Buayan
- Sultanate of Talayan
- Sultanate of Tinungkup (located within modern-day Datu Saudi-Ampatuan, Maguindanao del Sur, near the Pulangi River)
- Sultanate of Sapakan
- Sultanate of Matenggawan
- Sultanate of Kabakan
- Sultanate of Buluan
- Sultanate of Tacunabago (within modern-day Mangudadatu, Maguindanao del Sur)
- Sultanate of Bago Inged (within modern-day Pagalungan, Maguindanao del Sur)
- Sultanate of Talic
- Sultanate of Makar (within modern-day General Santos City)
- Sultanate of Glan
- Tawlan (Idalemen Iranuns)

Throughout Buayan's history, the suffix of 'sa-Buayan' was often added in the name of territories as an indicator that the territory was a district within Buayan's direct control rather than a vassal of Buayan. The main capital of Buayan was also referred to as Buayan-sa-Buayan.

== History ==
=== Foundation and Islamization ===
The Buayan people, formerly known as Kiliman, was said to have been founded in the mid 14th century before the early batch of sharif preachers from Maguindanao and Sulu. According to the Tarsila, an Islamic genealogical document about the ruling clans of Mindanao, Datu Mamu was the first recorded ruler of Buayan. Datu Mamu married princesses from several chiefdoms, expanding his influence.

After the arrival of Rajah Baguinda Ali from Basilan to Mindanao, Maguindanao, Lanao, and Buayan all converted to Islam.

Eventually, mainland Mindanao began to split between two sovereign entities, the Sa-raya (Upper Valley) headed by the interior Sultanate of Buayan, and the Sa-ilud (Lower Valley) maritime sultanate of Maguindanao.

=== Reign of Rajah Silongan ===
One of the first rulers of Buayan that the Spaniards encountered was Rajah Silongan. In April 1596, Rajah Silongan held off against the joint forces of Maguindanao and Spain, eventually subordinating the Sultan of Maguindanao, Kapitan Laut Buisan, and form a confederacy that composed of Buayan, Cotabato, and Tamontaka.

In 1599, Rajah Silongan, accompanied by 3,000 Buayan Moros, joined forces with Datu Salikula of Maguindanao and assaulted the coast communities of Cebu, Negros, and Panay, inflicting many atrocities. A huge force tried a repeat in 1600 but was repelled in southern Panay. In 1602, the Sultan of Buayan invaded Batangas but was repelled at Balayan. They also invaded Calamianes and gained 700 captives. In 1603, Buayan attacked Leyte.

In 1605, a peace treaty negotiated by Melchor Hurtado was signed between Maguindanao, Buayan, and Spain. On 8 September 1605, Spain and Buayan signed an agreement to recognize Rajah Silongan as the paramount ruler of Maguindanao in exchange for his allegiance to Spain. This was done as a divisive measure to encourage strife between Maguindanao and Buayan. Eventually, Kapitan Laut Buisan of Cotabato would distance himself from Rajah Silongan and establish his own community on the coast.

On 22 July 1609, after the leaders of Buayan learned of the Spanish capture of Ternate, Rajah Silongan and Kapitan Laut Buisan sent a letter to the Spanish governor-general in Manila to ask for forgiveness for their previous alliance with the Sultanate of Ternate. In 1619, the Sultanate of Buayan faced a decline due to the rise of Sultan Muhammad Kudarat of Maguindanao. Eventually, by 1634, the confederacy headed by Rajah Silongan disappeared. He was reduced into a petty king.

Rajah Silongan may have formally abdicated and was succeeded by Monkay (Datu Maputi) in approximately 1627.

=== Reign of Rajah Baratamay ===
After the ascension of Rajah Baratamay in 1648, succeeding Datu Maputi, Buayan was heavily influenced by Maguindanao under Sultan Muhammad Kudarat. Eventually, a union between Buayan and Maguindanao would form, but it was made clear to many in the Pulangi River valley that despite Buayan's influence in the interior, Maguindanao was considered as the dominant power in the entire region. Rajah Baratamay eventually gave support for the defense of Mindanao against Spain.

=== Reign of Datu Uto ===
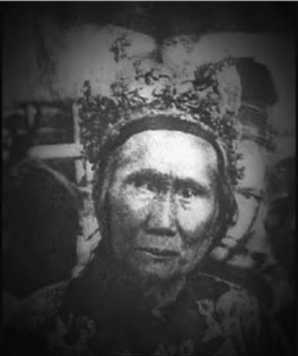
Datu Uto, Sultan of Buayan

At the beginning of the 19th century, the Spaniards occupied Maguindanao and was able to establish an alliance with the Sultanate of Buayan. In 1864, a rebellion against Spanish rule occurred within the Sultanate of Talayan. Sultan Bangon of Buayan sent his son Datu Uto along with 500 warriors to quell the rebellion upon the Spanish request to assist the Spanish forces marching towards Talayan. However, Datu Uto went against his father's orders and joined the rebels in Talayan. Datu Uto was able to push the Spaniards as far as Taviran. However, as a result of the battle, Datu Uto lost his left eye.

After his father's death in 1872, his uncle, Bayao of Kudarangan, succeeded as the Sultan of Buayan. However, it was Datu Uto who held real power. Eventually, he emerged to become the Sultan of Buayan in 1875, formally succeeding his uncle and was able to expand his influence in the Cotabato Basin and resist Spanish domination over the Sultanate of Buayan. Moreover, Datu Uto was able to establish an alliance with the Sultan of Sulu, which became important due to their need for firearms to continue the resistance. Sulu's demand for slaves led Datu Uto to change his behavior towards the neighboring Tiruray people, and began to kidnap for slaves within Tiruray territory, which were sold via the Bay of Sarangani on the southern tip of Mindanao.

While the Spanish could not occupy Buayan itself, they focused and succeeded in taking over the datus of smaller territories within Buayan causing the alliance network of Buayan to weaken and promote further defections of allegiance. A capitulation treaty between Buayan and Spain was signed on 10 March 1887, affecting Buayan's prestige. Buayan officially became a vassal of Spain. However, Datu Uto saw this as merely a peace treaty and not as an actual act of capitulation.

The Spanish colonial forces established several forts within the territory of Buayan such as Fort Reina Regente in Tinungkup and Fort Pikit in modern-day Malidegao, Cotabato.

=== Betrayal of Datu Piang, Amai Mingka ===
Datu Piang, a Chinese-mestizo, was formerly the appointed Minister of Lands by Datu Uto. According to oral tradition, many of Datu Uto's followers defected him for Datu Piang, as Datu Uto refused to open his granaries to his people during a time of famine. This helped Datu Piang gain a large following.

While Datu Piang was often referred to as 'Datu', he was a commoner who had no noble origin and never used the honorific to refer to himself. Rather, he referred to himself as Ama ni Mingka (Father of Mingka).

Eventually, in January 1899, Datu Piang betrayed Uto and established his headquarters on the old Buayan capital, now renamed Dulawan, as well as capturing Bacat, another capital of Buayan. From there, Piang overthrew the Spanish garrison in Cotabato and Tamontaka and granted himself the title of 'Sultan of Mindanao'. This left Datu Uto frustrated as Datu Piang became a rival of Buayan. In December 1899, American forces landed in Cotabato and Datu Piang collaborated with the American authorities. This left Datu Ali, the ruler of Tinungkup and eventually Buayan, as the only formidable opponent that was able to form a resistance against American forces in Mindanao.

=== Reign of Datu Ali ===
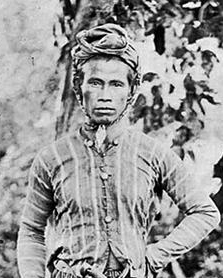
Datu Ali of Tinungkup

In 1899, Datu Uto handed over his throne to his first cousin Datu Ali of Tinungkup. He became the Rajah of Buayan, emerging as the supreme ruler of the Upper Cotabato Valley and was able to form an alliance to resist American attempts of subjugating the interior datus into their administration.

In 1905, Buayan fully lost its independence after Datu Ali of Tinungkup, stricken with malaria at the time, was killed by American forces in the Battle of the Malala River during the Moro Rebellion. Buayan fell into an interregnum afterwards and was eventually absorbed into the American colonial administration. With the help of Datu Piang and several datus, the American authorities were quickly able to assert their military and eventually, civilian form of government in Moro territory, thereby either incorporating datus into the civil government, or reducing their royal titles into the status of a mere traditional leader.

== Economy ==
=== Agriculture and exports ===
Buayan was a rich source of agriculture due to its fertile land, having rice as one of its primary exports. However, Buayan also traded using forest products such as tobacco, rattan, beeswax and hardwood. Buayan also imported various products from Chinese traders and settlers.

=== Slavery ===
Buayan heavily relied on the acquisition of slaves. They hunted for slaves by sending pirates through the mouth of the Pulangi River but had to pay a toll fee to the Sultanate of Maguindanao to be given access. From the Pulangi, they traversed through several areas within Spanish territory. Most of the victims of their slave hunting were people from the Visayas. Pirates originating from Buayan were able to acquire many slaves to the point where the term 'Bisaya' became synonymous to 'slave'. However, after the surrender of Maguindanao to the Spanish and the subsequent Spanish occupation of Cotabato, the access to the Moro Gulf from the Pulangi was closed to the interior for good. For this reason, Buayan relied on its port in Sarangani, the territory known as 'Sugud Buayan', primarily to maintain maritime access to the outside world. Buayan created a highway system through the flatlands of Tupi and Polomolok, which were said to be uninhabited and a safe place to traverse.

The Spanish occupation also brought an end to Moro piracy in Luzon and Visayas, and therefore a significant decrease in the acquisition of slaves. This created an incentive to find another source for slaves. During the reign of Datu Uto, slaves were mainly acquired from the mountains through forceful means, especially through the kidnapping or wars against pagan tribes in the region. The number of slaves became the basis to determine the wealth of the sultan. These slaves also worked as farmers, cultivating the land of their local datus and the sultan himself.

== See also ==
- Sultanate of Maguindanao
- Sultanate of Sulu
- Rajah Buayan, Maguindanao del Sur
- Datu Uto
- Datu Ali
