= Legislative districts of Sultan Kudarat =

Philippine congressional districts

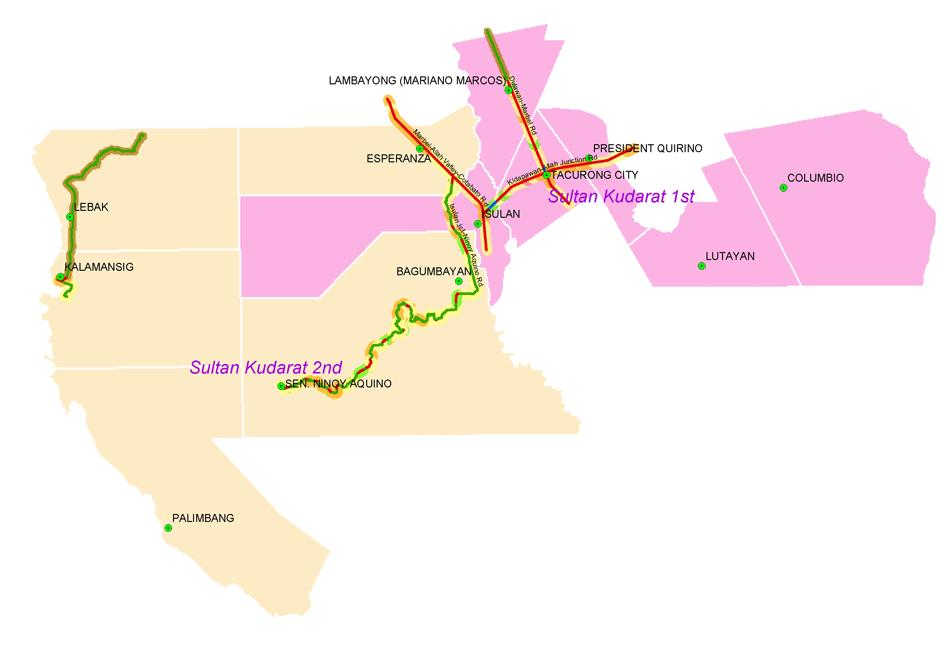
Map of 1st and 2nd Legislative Districts of Sultan Kudarat

The legislative districts of Sultan Kudarat are the representations of the province of Sultan Kudarat in the various national legislatures of the Philippines. The province is currently represented in the lower house of the Congress of the Philippines through its first and second congressional districts.

== History ==
Prior to gaining separate representation, areas now under the jurisdiction of Sultan Kudarat were represented under the Department of Mindanao and Sulu (1917–1935) and Cotabato (1935–1972).

The enactment of Presidential Decree No. 341 on November 22, 1973 created the Province of Sultan Kudarat out of the reduced Cotabato Province's southern municipalities. This new province was represented in the Interim Batasang Pambansa as part of Region XII from 1978 to 1984.

Sultan Kudarat first gained separate representation in 1984, when it returned one representative, elected at large, to the Regular Batasang Pambansa.

Under the new Constitution which was proclaimed on February 11, 1987, the province constituted a lone congressional district, and elected its member to the restored House of Representatives starting that same year.

The approval of Republic Act No. 9357 on October 10, 2006 increased Sultan Kudarat's representation by reapportioning the province into two congressional districts, which elected their separate representatives starting in the 2007 elections.

== 1st District ==
- City: Tacurong
- Municipalities: Columbio, Isulan, Lambayong, Lutayan, President Quirino
- Population (2020): 427,963

Period	Representative
14th Congress; 2007–2010	Datu Pax S. Mangudadatu
15th Congress; 2010–2013	Raden C. Sakaluran
16th Congress; 2013–2016	Raden C. Sakaluran
17th Congress; 2016–2019	Suharto T. Mangudadatu
18th Congress; 2019–2022	Bai Rihan M. Sakaluran-Abdurajak
19th Congress; 2022–2025	Bai Rihan M. Sakaluran-Abdurajak
20th Congress; 2025–2028	Ruth M. Sakaluran

== 2nd District ==
- Municipalities: Bagumbayan, Esperanza, Kalamansig, Lebak, Palimbang, Senator Ninoy Aquino
- Population (2020): 426,089

Period	Representative
14th Congress; 2007–2010	Arnold F. Go
15th Congress; 2010–2013	Arnold F. Go
16th Congress; 2013–2016	Arnold F. Go
17th Congress; 2016–2019	Horacio P. Suansing, Jr.
18th Congress; 2019–2022	Horacio P. Suansing, Jr.
19th Congress; 2022–2025	Horacio P. Suansing, Jr.
20th Congress; 2025–2028	Bella Vanessa B. Suansing

== Lone District (defunct) ==
Period	Representative
8th Congress; 1987–1992	Estanislao V. Valdez
9th Congress; 1992–1995	Estanislao V. Valdez
10th Congress; 1995–1998	Angelo O. Montilla
11th Congress; 1998–2001	Angelo O. Montilla
12th Congress; 2001–2004	Angelo O. Montilla
13th Congress; 2004–2007	Suharto T. Mangudadatu

== At-Large (defunct) ==
Period	Representative
Regular Batasang Pambansa; 1984–1986	Benjamin C. Duque

== See also ==
- Legislative district of Mindanao and Sulu
- Legislative district of Cotabato
- 1987 Constitution of the Philippines
