= Sultan Kudarat's 1st congressional district =

Legislative district of the Philippines

- Constituency for the House of Representatives of the Philippines
- Location of Sultan Kudarat within the Philippines
- Province: Sultan Kudarat
- Region: Soccsksargen
- Population: 427,963 (2020)
- Electorate: 250,786 (2022)
- Major settlements: 6 LGUs: Cities; Tacurong; Municipalities; Columbio; Isulan; Lambayong; Lutayan; President Quirino
- Area: 2,327.08 km^{2} (898.49 sq mi)

Current constituency
- Created: 2006
- Representative: Ruth M. Sakaluran
- Political party: Lakas–CMD
- Congressional bloc: Majority

Sultan Kudarat's 1st congressional district is one of the two congressional districts of the Philippines in the province of Sultan Kudarat. It has been represented in the House of Representatives since 2007. It was created after the 2006 reapportionment that divided the province into two congressional districts. The district is composed of the provincial capital, Isulan, its largest city, Tacurong, and the eastern municipalities of Columbio, Lambayong, Lutayan and President Quirino. It is currently represented in the 20th Congress by Bai Ruth M. Sakaluran of the Lakas–CMD.

== Representation history ==
#	Image	Member	Term of office		Congress	Party	Electoral history	Constituent LGUs
#	Image	Member	Start	End	Congress	Party	Electoral history	Constituent LGUs
=== Sultan Kudarat's 1st district for the House of Representatives of the Philippines ===
District created October 2, 2006 from Sultan Kudarat's at-large district.
1		Pax Mangudadatu	June 30, 2007	June 30, 2010	14th	Lakas	Elected in 2007.	2007–present Columbio, Isulan, Lambayong, Lutayan, President Quirino, Tacurong
2		Raden C. Sakaluran	June 30, 2010	June 30, 2016	15th	Independent	Elected in 2010.	2007–present Columbio, Isulan, Lambayong, Lutayan, President Quirino, Tacurong
2		Raden C. Sakaluran	June 30, 2010	June 30, 2016	16th	Independent	Re-elected in 2013.	2007–present Columbio, Isulan, Lambayong, Lutayan, President Quirino, Tacurong
3		Suharto Mangudadatu	June 30, 2016	June 30, 2019	17th	NUP	Elected in 2016.	2007–present Columbio, Isulan, Lambayong, Lutayan, President Quirino, Tacurong
4		Rihan M. Sakaluran	June 30, 2019	June 30, 2025	18th	NUP	Elected in 2019.	2007–present Columbio, Isulan, Lambayong, Lutayan, President Quirino, Tacurong
4		Rihan M. Sakaluran	June 30, 2019	June 30, 2025	19th	Lakas	Re-elected in 2022.	2007–present Columbio, Isulan, Lambayong, Lutayan, President Quirino, Tacurong
5		Ruth M. Sakaluran	June 30, 2025	Incumbent	20th	Lakas	Elected in 2025.	2007–present Columbio, Isulan, Lambayong, Lutayan, President Quirino, Tacurong

== Election results ==
=== 2025 ===
Candidate	Party	Votes	%
Ruth Sakaluran	Lakas–CMD	158,034	100.00
Total		158,034	100.00
Valid votes		158,034	67.23
Invalid/blank votes		77,021	32.77
Total votes		235,055	100.00
Registered voters/turnout		275,693	85.26
Lakas–CMD hold			
Source: Commission on Elections

=== 2013 ===
2013 Philippine House of Representatives election at Sultan Kudarat's 1st district
Party	Candidate	Votes	%
Independent	Raden Sakaluran	71,977	69.68
Liberal	Carlos Valdez	31,319	30.32
Total votes		103,296	100.00
Independent hold			

== See also ==
- Legislative districts of Sultan Kudarat
