= Buluan River =

River in Maguindanao del Sur, Philippines

- Buluan River mouth Buluan River (Philippines)

Location
- Country: Philippines
- Region: Bangsamoro Autonomous Region
- Province: Maguindanao del Sur
- Municipality: Buluan

Physical characteristics
- Source: Lake Buluan
  - location: Maguindanao del Sur
  - coordinates: 6°42′20″N 124°48′10″E
- 2nd source: Palian River
- Mouth: Liguasan Marsh
  - coordinates: 6°47′41″N 124°47′41″E
- Length: 109 km (68 mi)

Basin features
- Progression: Buluan–Liguasan Marsh–Mindanao

The Buluan River is a black river in the provinces of Maguindanao del Sur and Sultan Kudarat in the island of Mindanao, Philippines. Located in Buluan joint by the Liguasan Marsh stream of the Rio Grande de Mindanao. The total length of the Buluan River system including the upper Palian River is 109 km (68 mi) and 36.5 km (22.7 mi) from Lake Buluan to Liguasan Marsh.

The river flooded in July 2026.
