= Sultan Kudarat State University =

Public university in Sultan Kudarat, Philippines

- Pamantasang Pampamahalaan ng Sultan Kudarat (Filipino)
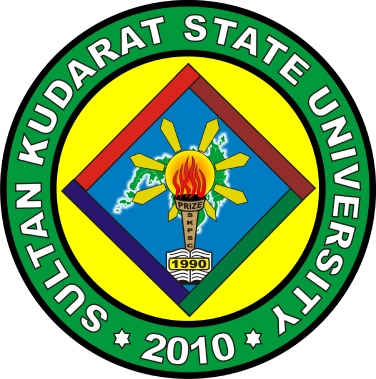
- Former name: Sultan Kudarat Polytechnic State College (1990–2010)
- Motto: Generators of Solutions
- Type: Public, State university
- Established: December 5, 1990; 35 years ago
- Academic affiliations: MASCUF, PASUC AACCUP, IDEAL
- President: Atty. Cyrus E. Torreña, DPA, MNSA
- Vice-president: List: Alan A. Maglantay, PhD (VP for Academic Affairs); Reynaldo H. Dalayap, PhD (VP for Finance and Administration); Mildred F. Accad, PhD (VP for Research Development, Extension and Innovation)
- Location: ACCESS, EJC Montilla, Tacurong City, Sultan Kudarat, Philippines; 6°41′30″N 124°40′42″E
- Campus: List; ACCESS (Main) Campus; Tacurong Campus; Isulan Campus; Lutayan Campus; Bagumbayan Campus; Palimbang Campus; Kalamansig Campus
- Colors: Green and Blue
- Nicknames: SKSUans, Animo Usa
- Sporting affiliations: SCUAA
- Mascot: Deer
- Website: sksu.edu.ph
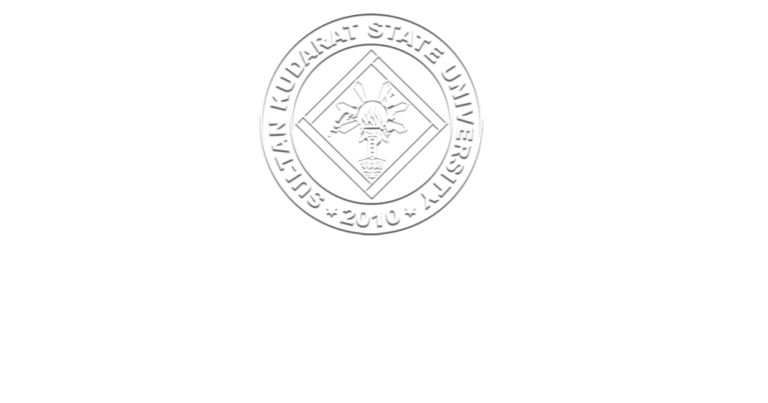

- Location in Mindanao Location in the Philippines

Sultan Kudarat State University (SKSU; Filipino: Pamantasang Pampamahalaan ng Sultan Kudarat) is a state university in the province of Sultan Kudarat, Mindanao, Philippines. Formerly Sultan Kudarat Polytechnic State College (SKPSC), it became a university in 2010. There are seven campuses within Sultan Kudarat.

The university provides instruction in science and technology, agriculture, fisheries, and education. It also undertakes research and extension services.

== History ==
Sultan Kudarat State University (SKSU) began as Sultan Kudarat Polytechnic State College (SKPSC), which was created on December 5, 1990 through Republic Act 6973, also known as the SKPSC Charter. The institution was formed by integrating five high schools previously supervised by the Department of Education, Culture and Sports in the municipalities of Isulan, Kalamansig, Palimbang, Tacurong and Lutayan. These schools became the initial core of the state college, with the main administrative site later established at the Administration Center and Central Educational Site and Services (ACCESS) in Sitio Dos, Barangay EJC Montilla, Tacurong City.

Dr. Nelson T. Binag served as the first president and led the institution for eighteen years. During his tenure, the college expanded its academic programs, strengthened faculty and staff development and opened extension sites in Senator Ninoy Aquino, Bagumbayan, Glan and Surallah in collaboration with local government units. Various programs were also developed to support local industries and agriculture-based communities across the province. The Lutayan campus became known for agriculture programs, Kalamansig for fisheries and Tacurong for liberal arts and science programs. The Isulan campus housed engineering, industrial technology and information science programs, while the extension campuses in Palimbang, Bagumbayan and Senator Ninoy Aquino offered education and agriculture-related courses. ACCESS later became the center for postgraduate studies.

Efforts to transition SKPSC into a university began during Dr. Binag’s later years and continued under the second president, Dr. Teresita L. Cambel. On January 18, 2010, President Gloria Macapagal-Arroyo signed Republic Act 9966, officially converting SKPSC into Sultan Kudarat State University. Dr. Cambel became the first president of the newly established university.

Dr. Rolando F. Hechanova, who assumed office as the third president on August 12, 2014, implemented reforms focused on institutional transparency, academic excellence, faculty promotion, infrastructure development and accreditation of academic programs through AACCUP. His administration strengthened CHED compliance, improved licensure examination outcomes and expanded both national and international partnerships for research and extension.

In 2022, Dr. Samson L. Molao became the fourth president of SKSU. His leadership emphasized the university’s vision of becoming a leading institution in advancing scholarly innovation, multicultural convergence and responsive public service within a globally connected region. Under his administration, the College of Medicine was formally established through Republic Act 12283, enacted on September 7, 2025. The measure was sponsored by Sultan Kudarat First District Representative Hon. Princess Rihan Mangudadatu-Sakaluran, with substantial support from the Provincial Government of Sultan Kudarat under Governor Hon. Datu Pax Ali S. Mangudadatu.

As of today, SKSU offers a range of undergraduate and graduate programs, including law, medicine and other professional fields, reflecting its commitment to accessible and high-quality education.

== Presidents ==
- Dr. Nelson T. Binag (1990 – 2008)
- Dr. Teresita L. Cambel (2008 – 2014)
- Dr. Rolando F. Hechanova (2014 – 2022)
- Dr. Samson L. Molao (2022 – 2023) (2024 – 2026)
- Atty. Cyrus E. Torreña (2026 - Present)

Officer-in-Charge

- Dr. Jesusa D. Ortuoste (November 23, 2023 - December 18, 2024)

== Colleges and campuses ==
=== Colleges ===
- College of Agriculture
- College of Agribusiness
- College of Arts and Sciences
- College of Business Administration and Hospitality Management
- College of Computer Studies
- College of Criminal Justice Education
- College of Engineering
- College of Fisheries
- College of Health Sciences
- College of Industrial Technology
- College of Law
- College of Medicine
- College of Teacher Education
- Graduate School
- Laboratory High School

=== Campuses ===
- Administration Center and Central Educational Site and Services (ACCESS) Campus in EJC Montilla, Tacurong City where the Laboratory High School (LHS), College of Teacher Education (CTE), College of Graduate Studies, College of Law, College of Medicine (COM), College of Criminal Justice Education (CCJE) and College of Health Sciences (CHS) are located.
- Isulan Campus
- Bagumbayan Campus
- Lutayan Campus
- Kalamansig Campus
- Palimbang Campus
- Tacurong Campus

==== Former campuses ====
- Sen. Ninoy Aquino Campus
- Glan Campus
- Sunas Extension Campus
