= Buluan =

Capital of Maguindanao del Sur, Philippines

Buluan بولوان
- Municipality
- Municipality of Buluan
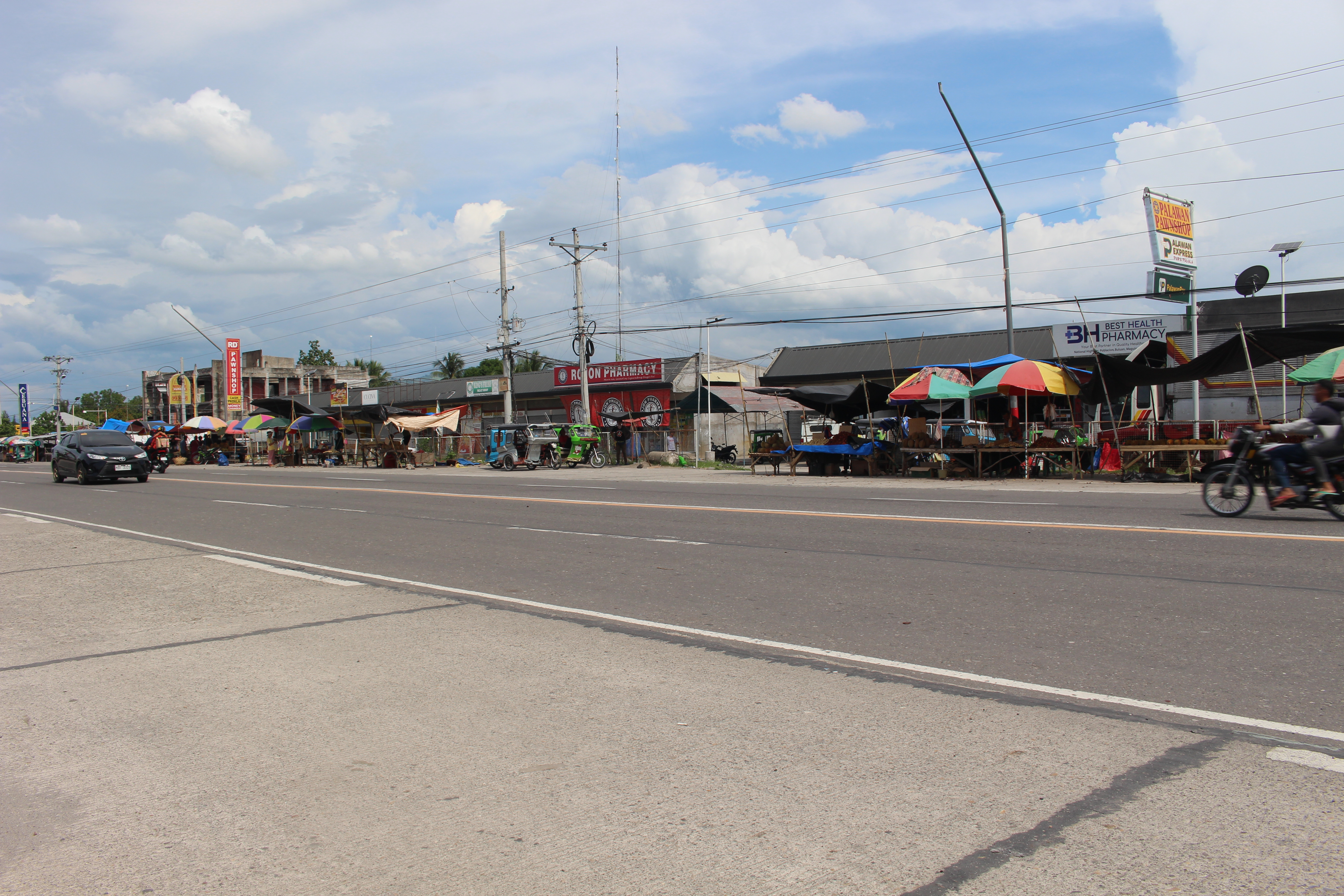
- Portion of Poblacion

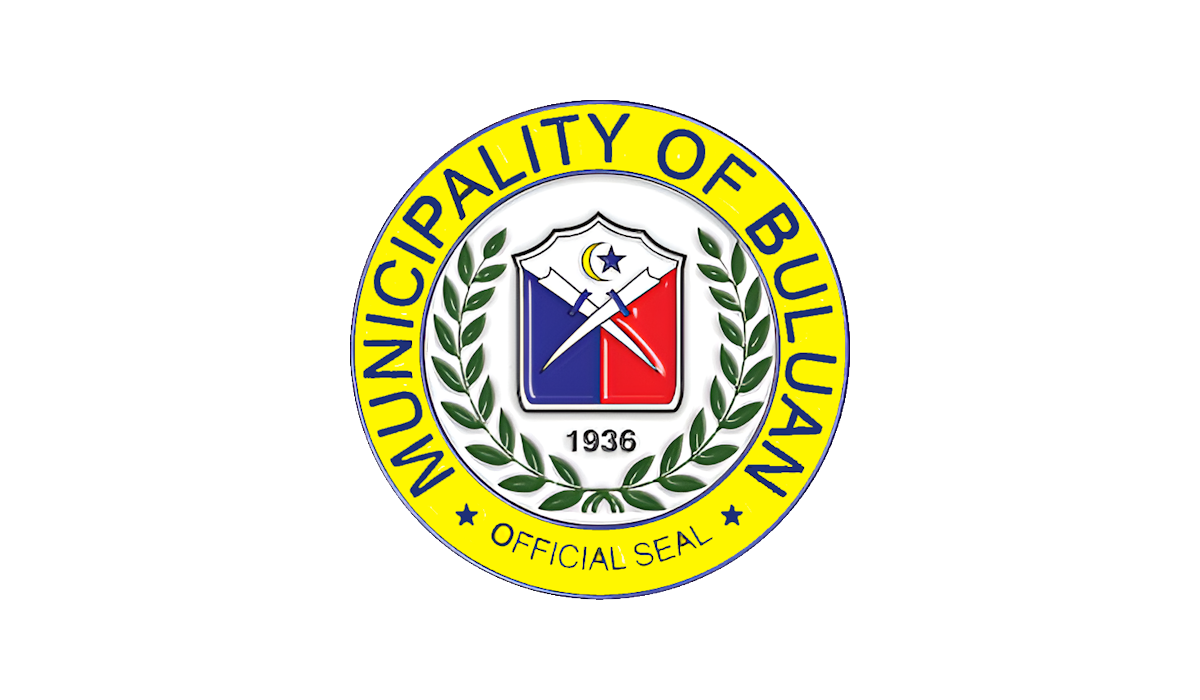
- Flag Seal

- Map of Maguindanao del Sur with Buluan highlighted
- Interactive map of Buluan
- Location within the Philippines
- Coordinates: 6°42′55″N 124°47′08″E
- Country: Philippines
- Region: Bangsamoro Autonomous Region in Muslim Mindanao
- Province: Maguindanao del Sur
- House district: Lone district
- Parliamentary district: 4th district
- Founded: August 8, 1947
- Barangays: 7 (see Barangays)

Government
  - Type: Sangguniang Bayan
  - Mayor: Ibrahim G. Mangudadatu
  - Vice Mayor: King Jhazzer T. Mangudadatu
  - Representative: Esmael Mangudadatu
  - Municipal Council: Members: Babydats D. Mangudadatu; Rhamla G. Mangudadatu; Princess Grace T. Mangudadatu; Mangko A. Mutin; Singcon L. Mangudadatu; Akbar L. Piang; Sali B. Mangudadatu; Tahir U. Alamada
  - Electorate: 24,078 voters (2025)

Area
  - Total: 699.50 km^{2} (270.08 sq mi)
- Elevation: 17 m (56 ft)
- Highest elevation: 38 m (125 ft)
- Lowest elevation: 7 m (23 ft)

Population (2024 census)
  - Total: 60,931
  - Density: 87.107/km^{2} (225.60/sq mi)
  - Households: 8,847

Economy
  - Income class: 1st municipal income class
  - Poverty incidence: 38.15% (2023)
  - Revenue: ₱ 24.43 million (2024)
  - Assets: ₱ 205.7 million (2024)
  - Expense: ₱ 250.4 million (2024)
  - Liabilities: ₱ 8.366 million (2023, 2024)

Service provider
  - Electricity: Sultan Kudarat Electric Cooperative (SUKELCO)
- Time zone: UTC+08:00 (PST)
- ZIP code: 9616
- PSGC: 1903803000
- IDD : area code: +63 (0)64
- Native languages: Maguindanao; Iranun; Tagalog
- Website: www.buluan.gov.ph

Buluan, officially the Municipality of Buluan (Maguindanaon: Inged nu Buluan; Tagalog: Bayan ng Buluan), is a municipality and capital of the province of Maguindanao del Sur, Philippines. According to the 2024 census, it had a population of 60,931.

The town was recognized by the Sangguniang Panlalawigan of the former Maguindanao province as the new (de jure) provincial capital in 2014, a move seen as the solution to the decades-old issue of Maguindanao's lack of a permanent provincial capitol due to local clan politics. Republic Act No. 11550 officially designated Buluan as the capital of Maguindanao del Sur.

== History ==
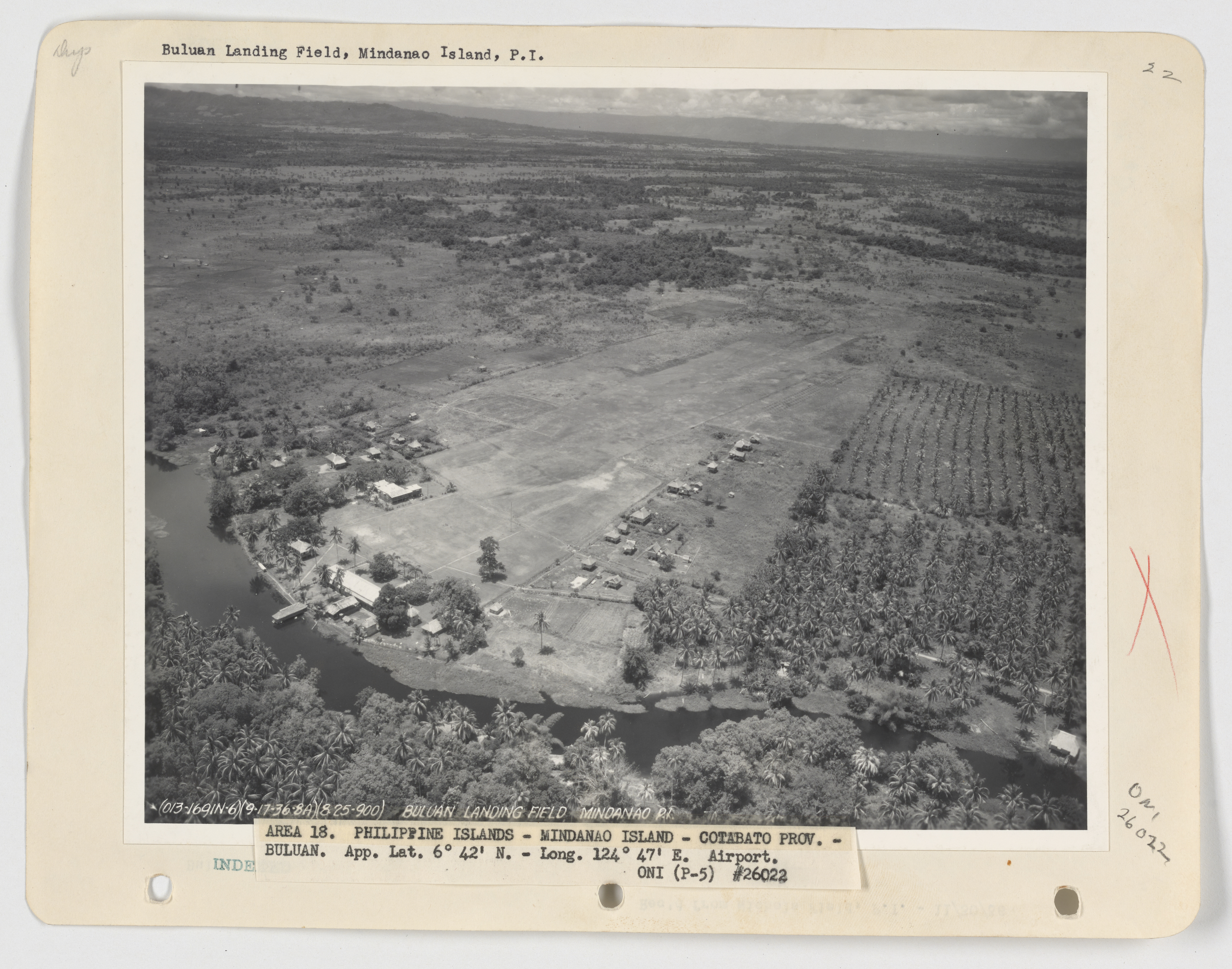
Aerial view of Buluan, date unknown

Buluan used to comprise a vast area surrounding Lake Buluan when it was created as one of the municipalities of Cotabato on August 8, 1947, by Executive Order No. 82 of Pres. Manuel Roxas. On August 3, 1951, the municipality of Tacurong was created out of its south-western portion. In 1961, its south-eastern portion was separated to form the municipality of Columbio, six years later its southern portion was made into the municipality of Lutayan. It was made part of the province of Maguindanao on November 22, 1973, at the same time ceding its western coast of Lake Buluan to create the municipality of President Quirino, which was made part of Sultan Kudarat province. Its northern portion was made into the municipality of General Salipada K. Pendatun on April 7, 1991. Its area was further divided on December 30, 2006, when two more municipalities were created out of its territory namely: Mangudadatu and Pandag, losing 8 barangays (south and north, respectively) to each of the two new towns.

In 2014, the Sangguniang Panlalawigan of Maguindanao passed a resolution naming Buluan the new capital of Maguindanao. Pending the completion of the new capitol complex, the provincial governor Esmael Mangudadatu (a Buluan native) will continue to hold office in the town's Rajah Buayan Silongan Peace Center — originally designated as a mere satellite office of the provincial government when Mangudadatu took office in 2010, but since the official designation of Buluan as provincial capital in 2014 has served as the provisional capitol building. However, the legislative branch of provincial government, the Sangguniang Panlalawigan of Maguindanao, continues to hold sessions in the refurbished buildings of the old provincial capitol in Simuay, Sultan Kudarat, by virtue of Sangguniang Panlalawigan Resolution No. 78 dated May 3, 2011. The old provincial capitol complex, built next to the previous governor's properties in Shariff Aguak, was converted for public use.

== Geography ==
=== Barangays ===
Buluan is politically subdivided into 7 barangays. Each barangay consists of puroks while some have sitios.

- Digal
- Lower Siling
- Maslabeng
- Poblacion Mopac
- Popol
- Talitay
- Upper Siling

=== Climate ===
Climate data for Buluan, Maguindanao del Sur
Month	Jan	Feb	Mar	Apr	May	Jun	Jul	Aug	Sep	Oct	Nov	Dec	Year
Mean daily maximum °C (°F)	31 (88)	31 (88)	32 (90)	32 (90)	31 (88)	30 (86)	30 (86)	30 (86)	30 (86)	30 (86)	30 (86)	31 (88)	31 (87)
Mean daily minimum °C (°F)	23 (73)	23 (73)	23 (73)	24 (75)	24 (75)	24 (75)	24 (75)	24 (75)	24 (75)	24 (75)	24 (75)	24 (75)	24 (75)
Average precipitation mm (inches)	64 (2.5)	45 (1.8)	59 (2.3)	71 (2.8)	140 (5.5)	179 (7.0)	192 (7.6)	198 (7.8)	163 (6.4)	147 (5.8)	113 (4.4)	66 (2.6)	1,437 (56.5)
Average rainy days	12.2	10.3	12.7	15.7	26.0	27.4	28.1	28.2	26.0	26.7	22.9	16.6	252.8
Source: Meteoblue (modeled/calculated data, not measured locally)

== Demographics ==
Population census of Buluan
Year	Pop.	±% p.a.
1918	5,263	—
1939	15,317	+5.22%
1948	61,934	+16.79%
1960	73,201	+1.40%
1970	49,158	−3.90%
1975	41,357	−3.41%
1980	38,313	−1.52%
1990	53,143	+3.33%
1995	38,695	−5.77%
2000	51,098	+6.14%
2007	32,310	−6.13%
2010	38,106	+6.19%
2015	50,008	+5.31%
2020	57,406	+2.95%
2024	60,931	+1.44%
Source: Philippine Statistics Authority

== Economy ==
Poverty Incidence of Buluan

Source: Philippine Statistics Authority
