= President Quirino, Sultan Kudarat =

Municipality in Sultan Kudarat, Philippines

President Quirino
- Municipality
- Municipality of President Quirino
- Municipal Hall

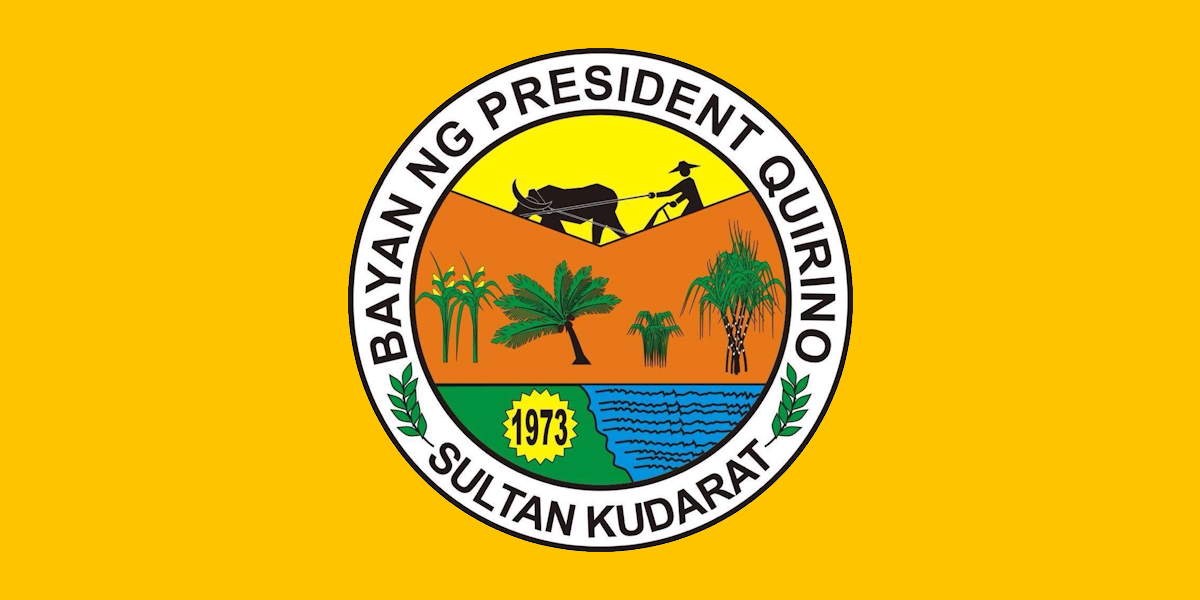
- Flag Seal
- Nicknames: Arangkada, President Quirino!; Jewel of Southcentral Mindanao; A gateway and major producer of Muscovado in Sultan Kudarat
- Anthem: Pres. Quirino Hymn
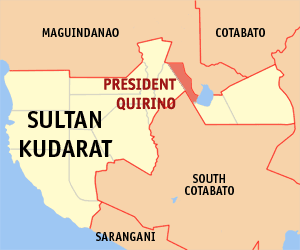
- Map of Sultan Kudarat with President Quirino highlighted
- Interactive map of President Quirino
- Location within the Philippines
- Coordinates: 6°42′N 124°44′E
- Country: Philippines
- Region: Soccsksargen
- Province: Sultan Kudarat
- District: 1st district
- Founded: November 22, 1973
- Named after: Elpidio Quirino
- Barangays: 19 (see Barangays)

Government
  - Type: Municipal Local Government Unit
  - Mayor: Hon. Ma. Katrina Buena F. Sandigan
  - Vice Mayor: Hon. Meris D. Aradanas
  - Representative: Hon. Bai Rihan M. Sakaluran-Abdulrajak
  - Municipal Council: Members: Hon. Liwayway B. Dumrigue; Hon. Cherry Anne E. Silvestre; Hon. Mark John P. Cabacungan; Hon. Alexander U. Aradanas; Hon. Modesto S. Belmonte Jr.; Hon. Renato A. Dela Reyna; Hon. Joel G. Pascua; Hon. Dominador N. Vallejos Jr.; Hon. Rosemarie C. Andale - ABC Pres./Ex-Officio Member; Hon. Moner A. Guiamalon - SKMF Pres./Ex-Officio Member
  - Electorate: 28,966 voters (2025)

Area
  - Total: 208.40 km^{2} (80.46 sq mi)
- Elevation: 29 m (95 ft)
- Highest elevation: 69 m (226 ft)
- Lowest elevation: 13 m (43 ft)

Population (2024 census)
  - Total: 44,344
  - Density: 212.78/km^{2} (551.11/sq mi)
  - Households: 10,488

Economy
  - Income class: 2nd municipal income class
  - Poverty incidence: 20.53% (2023)
  - Revenue: ₱ 211.7 million (2024)
  - Expenditure: ₱ 209.7 million (2024)
  - Liabilities: ₱ 319.1 million (2024)

Service provider
  - Electricity: Sultan Kudarat Electric Cooperative (SUKELCO)
- Time zone: UTC+8:00 (PST)
- ZIP code: 9804
- PSGC: 1206510000
- IDD : area code: +63 (0)64
- Native languages: Hiligaynon; Maguindanao; Tagalog

President Quirino, officially the Municipality of President Quirino (Filipino: Bayan ng President Quirino; Hiligaynon: Banwa sang President Quirino; Ilocano: Ili ti President Quirino; Maguindanaon: Inged nu President Kirinu, Jawi: ايڠد نو ڤريسيدنت كرينو), is a municipality in the province of Sultan Kudarat, Philippines. According to the 2024 census, it has a population of 44,344 people. It is named after Elpidio Quirino, the sixth President of the Philippines.

== History ==
President Quirino was formerly called Sambulawan and was part of the municipalities of Buluan and Tacurong. President Quirino was created into a separate municipality on November 22, 1973, at the same time when the province of Cotabato was divided into the provinces of North Cotabato (present-day Cotabato), Maguindanao, and Sultan Kudarat, by virtue of Presidential Decree No. 341 of President Ferdinand Marcos.

== Geography ==
President Quirino is located at the center of Central Mindanao. It is 110 kilometers (68 mi) from General Santos, 108 kilometers (67 mi) from Cotabato City, and 248 kilometers (154 mi) from Davao City. It is situated at the crossroads of the Davao-General Santos-Cotabato highways.

In the northern part is the municipality of General Salipada K. Pendatun, in the eastern part is municipality of Buluan, in the western part is the city of Tacurong and the southern part is the municipality of Tantangan, South Cotabato, in south-eastern part is municipality of Lutayan and Mangudadatu.

President Quirino is a vast plain municipality having one barangay (Estrella) extending to the lakeside of the famous Buluan Lake. It has four existing types of soil namely; tinambulan peat, Banga sandy loam, Lutayan clay, and hydrosol.

=== Barangays ===
President Quirino is politically subdivided into 19 barangays. Each barangay consists of puroks while some have sitios.

- Bagumbayan
- Bannawag
- Bayawa
- Central Mangilala
- Estrella
- Kalanawi I
- Kalanawi II
- Katico
- Malingon
- Mangelen
- Pedtubo
- Poblacion (Sambulawan)
- Romualdez
- San Jose
- Sinakulay
- Suben
- Tinaungan
- Tual (Liguasan)
- Tuato (San Pedro)

=== Climate ===
Climate data for President Quirino, Sultan Kudarat
Month	Jan	Feb	Mar	Apr	May	Jun	Jul	Aug	Sep	Oct	Nov	Dec	Year
Mean daily maximum °C (°F)	31 (88)	31 (88)	32 (90)	32 (90)	31 (88)	30 (86)	30 (86)	30 (86)	30 (86)	30 (86)	30 (86)	31 (88)	31 (87)
Mean daily minimum °C (°F)	23 (73)	23 (73)	23 (73)	24 (75)	24 (75)	24 (75)	24 (75)	24 (75)	24 (75)	24 (75)	24 (75)	23 (73)	24 (74)
Average precipitation mm (inches)	64 (2.5)	45 (1.8)	59 (2.3)	71 (2.8)	140 (5.5)	179 (7.0)	192 (7.6)	198 (7.8)	163 (6.4)	147 (5.8)	113 (4.4)	66 (2.6)	1,437 (56.5)
Average rainy days	12.2	10.3	12.7	15.7	26.0	27.4	28.1	28.2	26.0	26.7	22.9	16.6	252.8
Source: Meteoblue

== Demographics ==
Population census of President Quirino
Year	Pop.	±% p.a.
1975	19,029	—
1980	20,601	+1.60%
1990	23,591	+1.36%
1995	28,206	+3.40%
2000	32,721	+3.23%
2007	33,595	+0.36%
2010	38,753	+5.34%
2015	41,408	+1.27%
2020	42,244	+0.42%
2024	44,344	+1.17%
Source: Philippine Statistics Authority

=== Language ===
President Quirino is one of the few municipalities of Sultan Kudarat that has Ilocano-speaking majority, together with Lambayong whom are originally from Luzon. Most of them can speak and understand Hiligaynon, Tagalog and to the some extent, Cebuano and Maguindanaon, in addition to their own native language. Hiligaynon speakers are also significant residents in the area, with some of them can speak and understand Ilocano, Tagalog, Karay-a, Cebuano and Maguindanaon.

Other ethnolinguistic groups living in the municipality are Maguindanaons, Blaans, T'bolis, Manobos, Cebuanos and Tagalogs. Most of the residents are the descendants of settlers who came from Ilocandia, Cagayan Valley, Central Luzon, Calabarzon, Mindoro and Marinduque, with significant settlers from Panay (mainly Iloilo), Negros, as well as Cebu, Bohol and Siquijor. Indigenous people such as Blaan, Manobo and T'boli can be founded in Barangay Bagumbayan, Manobo can be found on Barangay Kalanawe I and Barangay Tinaungan, Blaan from Barangay San Jose and Maguindanaons on Barangay Bayawa as the barangay is near to the municipality of Buluan.

== Economy ==
Poverty incidence of President Quirino

Source: Philippine Statistics Authority

President Quirino is known as an economic and agricultural hub in the region. Among its local products are “sukang tuba at tubo” (vinegar made from coconut or sugarcane) and high-quality muscovado sugar, noted for its strong molasses flavor.

The municipality supports a variety of small-scale industries, including electronics and repair shops, vehicle body building and repair, vulcanizing and machine shops, shoe and appliance repair, hollow block and culvert production, basket and mat weaving, dressmaking and tailoring, balut production, and bakeries. Major agricultural and industrial products include rattan, banana, coconut, palay (rice), corn, and African palm oil. Corn drying, rice milling, and other milling activities are commonly carried out in the Poblacion or other central areas of the town.

== Culture ==
=== Sambuyawan Festival ===
Sambuyawan is celebrated every third week of November on giving way on its foundation in 1973. Cultures, local products, and tradition are shown in the festival such as Street dancing, drum & lyre, singing, dancing and other activities. Festival's name was derived from the former town named Sambulawan.

=== Muscovado / Tagapulot Festival ===
The Muscovado Festival is celebrated every December 12, In which people must be recognized the town's own economic product which is Tagapulot or sweet Sugarcane candy from the sugarcane plantations.

== Infrastructure ==
=== Transportation ===
President Quirino has no any public transport terminal, but there has habal-habal, jeepney, multicab, and bus transportation where you can hop in around the Kidapawan-Junction highway.

=== Communications ===
President Quirino has an official lane of Smart Communication tower substation and Globe Telecom substation in Barangay Poblacion. The Philippine Long Distance Telephone Company provides fixed line services. Wireless mobile communications services are provided by Smart Communications, Dito Telecommunity, and Globe Telecom.
