= Maguindanao language =

Austronesian language spoken in the Philippines

Maguindanaon
- Basa Magindanawn باس مڬندنون
- Native to: Philippines
- Region: Maguindanao del Norte, Maguindanao del Sur, Sultan Kudarat, Cotabato, South Cotabato, Sarangani, Zamboanga del Sur, Zamboanga Sibugay, Davao del Sur, Davao del Norte, Davao Occidental, Bukidnon
- Ethnicity: Maguindanaon
- Native speakers: 2,021,099 (2020)
- Language family: Austronesian: Malayo-Polynesian; Philippine; Greater Central Philippine; Danao; Maguindanaon
- Dialects: Biwangan; Ilud; Laya; Sibugay; Tagakawanan
- Writing system: Latin; Arabic (Jawi)

Official status
- Official language in: Regional language in the Philippines
- Regulated by: Komisyon sa Wikang Filipino

Language codes
- ISO 639-3: mdh
- Glottolog: magu1243
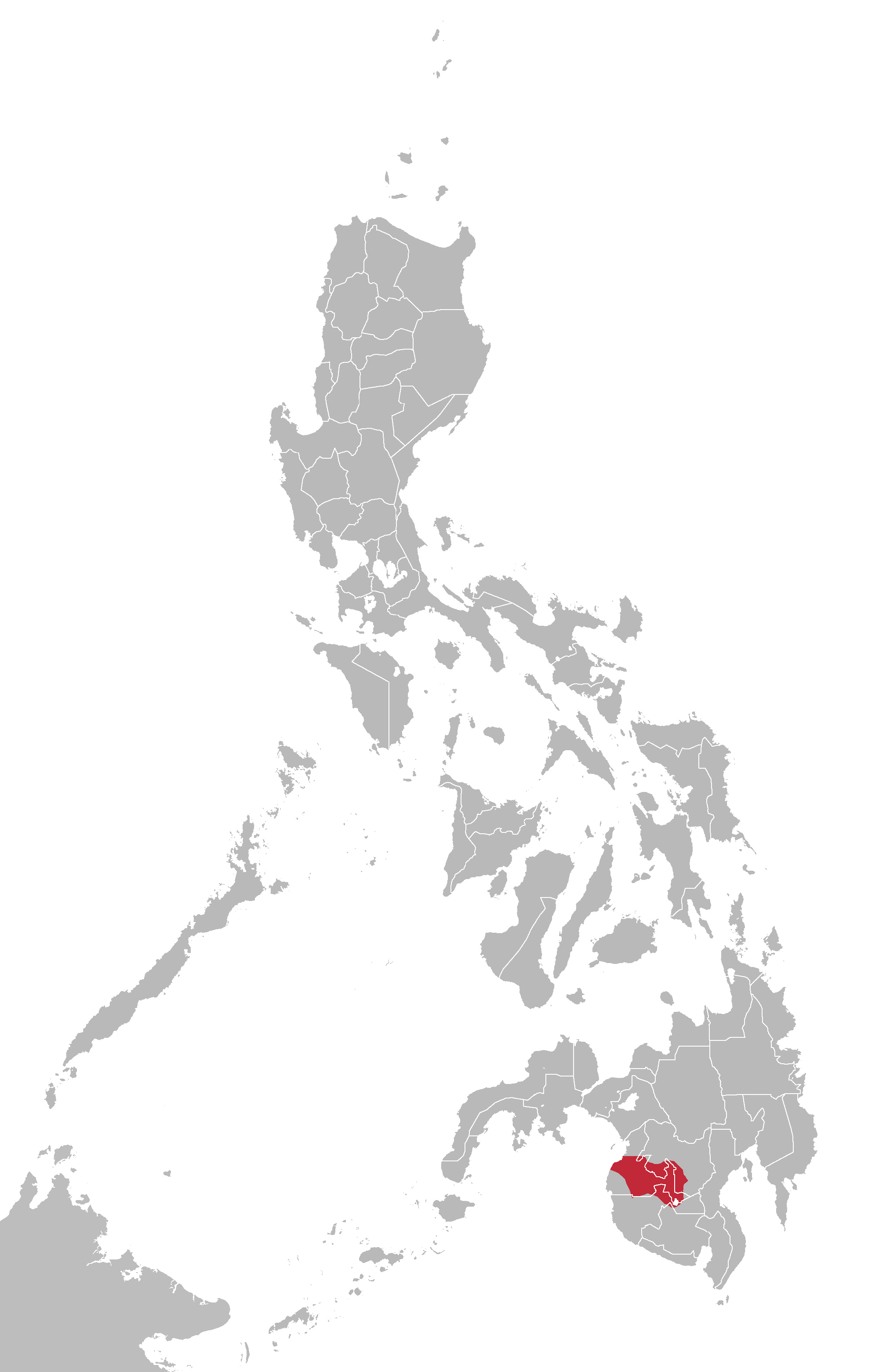
- Areas where Maguindanaon is the majority language

Maguindanaon (Basa Magindanawn, Jawi: باس مڬندنون), or Magindanawn is an Austronesian language spoken by Maguindanaon people who form majority of the population of eponymous provinces of Maguindanao del Norte and Maguindanao del Sur in the Philippines. It is also spoken by sizable minorities in different parts of Mindanao such as the cities of Zamboanga, Davao, General Santos, and Cagayan de Oro, and the provinces of Cotabato, Sultan Kudarat, South Cotabato, Sarangani, Zamboanga del Sur, Zamboanga Sibugay, Davao del Sur, Davao Occidental, Bukidnon as well as Metro Manila, Bulacan, Cavite, Rizal and Laguna. As of 2020, the language is ranked to be the ninth leading language spoken at home in the Philippines with only 365,032 households still speaking the language.

== History ==
The Maguindanaon language is the native language of the Maguindanaon people of the province of Maguindanao located in the west of Mindanao island in the south of the Philippines. It was the language of the Sultanate of Maguindanao, which lasted until near the end of the Spanish colonial period in the late 19th century.

Thomas Forrest published a vocabulary of the "Magindano tongue" in 1779 as an appendix to A Voyage to New Guinea, and the Moluccas, from Balambangan.

Other early works about the language by a European were written by Jacinto Juanmartí, a Catalan priest of the Society of Jesus who worked in the Philippines in the second half of the 19th century. Aside from a number of Christian religious works in the language, (Note: such as a Maguindanao–Spanish bilingual "sacred history", with a short wordlist, in 1888, in which Maguindanao was written in both Arabic characters and the Latin alphabet) Juanmartí also published a Maguindanao–Spanish/Spanish–Maguindanao dictionary and reference grammar in 1892. Shortly after sovereignty over the Philippines was transferred from Spain to the United States in 1898 as a result of the Spanish–American War, the American administration began publishing a number of works on the language in English, such as a brief primer and vocabulary in 1903, and a translation of Juanmartí's reference grammar into English in 1906.

A number of works about and in the language have since been published by Filipino and foreign authors.

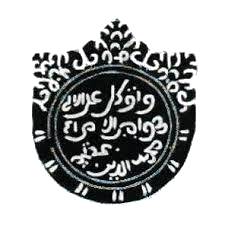
Maguindanao language in Arabic script on Maguindanao royal seal from the 18th century

== Distribution ==
Maguindanaon has 3 major dialects: Ilud, Laya, and Biwangen.

Maguindanaon dialects are:

- Ilud dialect: is spoken in Cotabato City, municipalities of Sultan Kudarat, Parang, Datu Odin Sinsuat, South Upi, Upi, Kabuntalan, Datu Piang, Datu Unsay, Shariff Aguak, Ampatuan, Mamasapano, Guindulungan, Sultan sa Barongis, Pagalungan, Datu Montawal (Pagagawan), Talitay and Talayan. From the province of Cotabato, the municipalities of Pigcawayan, Libungan, Midsayap, Aleosan, Alamada, Banisilan, Carmen, Pikit, Midsayap, Kabacan, Matalam, Kidapawan and Mlang. Lastly, from the province of Bukidnon, Damulog, and Kadingilan. The speech of the municipalities of Pikit, Matalam, Pagalungan and Datu Montawal (Pagagawan) differs in pronunciation and intonation from the ilud dialect, but is similar in vocabulary.
- Laya dialect: is spoken in municipalities of Buluan, Datu Paglas, General Salipada K. Pendatun, and Paglat, all in the province of Maguindanao del Sur, and Tulunan in the province of Cotabato; the municipalities of Lambayong, Esperanza, Isulan, Senator Ninoy Aquino, Bagumbayan, Tacurong, President Quirino, Columbio and Lutayan, all in the province of Sultan Kudarat; the municipalities of Santo Niño, Surallah, Norala, Banga, Lake Sebu, Koronadal, Tantangan, Polomolok, Tampakan and Tupi, all in the province of South Cotabato as well as some other parts of Davao City, Davao del Sur, Davao del Norte, Davao Oriental.
- Biwang dialect: is spoken in the coastal municipalities of Sultan Kudarat (Palimbang, Kalamansig and Lebak),
- Kawanan dialect: is spoken in the coastal municipalities of Zamboanga del Sur and Zamboanga Sibugay, some municipalities in Zamboanga del Norte and in Pagadian.
- Suk dialect: is spoken in General Santos, and Sarangani.

== Phonology ==
=== Vowels ===
Maguindanaon vowels
	Front	Central	Back
Close	i	ɨ ~ ə	u
Mid	(e)	ɨ ~ ə	(o)
Open		a	

The vowels [e] and [o] only occur in loanwords from Spanish through Tagalog or Cebuano and from Malay.

=== Consonants ===
Maguindanaon consonants
		Labial	Alveolar	Palatal	Velar	Glottal
Plosive	voiceless	p	t		k	
Plosive	voiced	b	d	(dʒ)	ɡ	
Fricative			s (z)			h
Nasal		m	n		ŋ	
Tap			ɾ			
Lateral			l			
Approximant		w		j		

The phonemes /z/ and /dʒ/ only appear in loanwords. The sound [dʒ] also appears an allophonic realization for the sequences /d + s/ (e.g. [dʒaɭumˈani ka] /(ə)dsalumani ka/ 'repeat that!') and /d + i/ (only before another vowel before vowel, e.g. [ˈmidʒas] /midias/ 'stockings'); the sound [z] also appears as an allophone of /s/ before voiced consonants. /ɾ/ can also be trilled [r]. Intervocalic /d/ is realized as [ɾ].

/ɾ/ and /l/ are interchangeable in words which include a written l, and the prevalence by which it is used or is dominant denotes the local dialects of Maguindanaon. /l/ may also be heard as a retroflex [ɭ] in intervocalic positions. The Laya (Raya) or lowland dialect of Maguindanaon, spoken in and around Cotabato City, prefers the flapped r over l, while the more conservative upland variety spoken in Datu Piang and inland areas favors l.

== Grammar ==
=== Pronouns ===
==== Personal pronouns ====
As in the Maranao language, Maguindanaon pronouns can be also free or bound to the word/morpheme before it.

Maguindanaon free and bound pronouns
	Nominative (free)	Nominative (bound)	Genitive/Ergative (bound)	Oblique (free)
I	saki	aku	ku	laki
you (singular)	seka	ka	'engka ~ nengka	leka
he/she/it	sekanin	sekanin	nin	lekanin
we (dual)	sekita	ta	ta	lekita
we (including you)	sekitanu	tanu	tanu	lekitanu
we (excluding you)	sekami	kami	nami	lekami
you (plural)	sekanu	kanu	nu	lekanu
they	silan	silan	nilan	kanilan

=== Numbers ===
Maguindanaon numerals:

	Maguindanaon
1	isa/sa
2	dua
3	telu
4	pat
5	lima
6	nem
7	pitu
8	walu
9	siaw
10	sapulu
20	dua pulu
30	telu pulu
40	pat pulu
50	lima pulu
60	nem pulu
70	pitu pulu
80	walu pulu
90	siaw pulu
100	magatus
1,000	sangibu

=== Colors ===
English	Maguindanaon
black	maitem
white	maputi
red	maliga
orange	kulit
yellow	binaning
green	gadung
blue	bilu
purple	lambayung
pink	kasumba
gray	kaumbi
brown	malalag

== Phrases ==
English	Maguindanaon	English	Maguindanaon
How are you?	Ngin i betad engka?	Good morning	Mapia mapita
Good noon	Mapia maudtu	Good afternoon	Mapia malulem
Good day	Mapia gay	Good evening	Mapia magabi
I will go now	Lemu aku den	Until next time	Sampay sa tundug a kutika
You're so diligent	Sangat i katulanged nengka / Matulanged ka a benal	You're so kind	Sangat i kalimu nengka / Malimu ka a benal
You're so beautiful	Sangat i kanisan nengka / Manisan ka a benal	Thanks!	Sukran!
Thank you!	Sukran sa leka!	Thank you very much!	Sukran a benal!
You're welcome	Apwan	Welcome!	Talus ka!
Yes	Uway	No	Di
None	Da	Not	Kena
Who?	Entain?	What?	Ngin?
Where?	Endaw?	Which?	Endaw san?
When?	Kanu?	How?	Panun?
Why?	Enduken?	This	Inia
That	Intu/Nan	There	San
Here	Sia	In	Lu

== Signs ==
Street sign samples
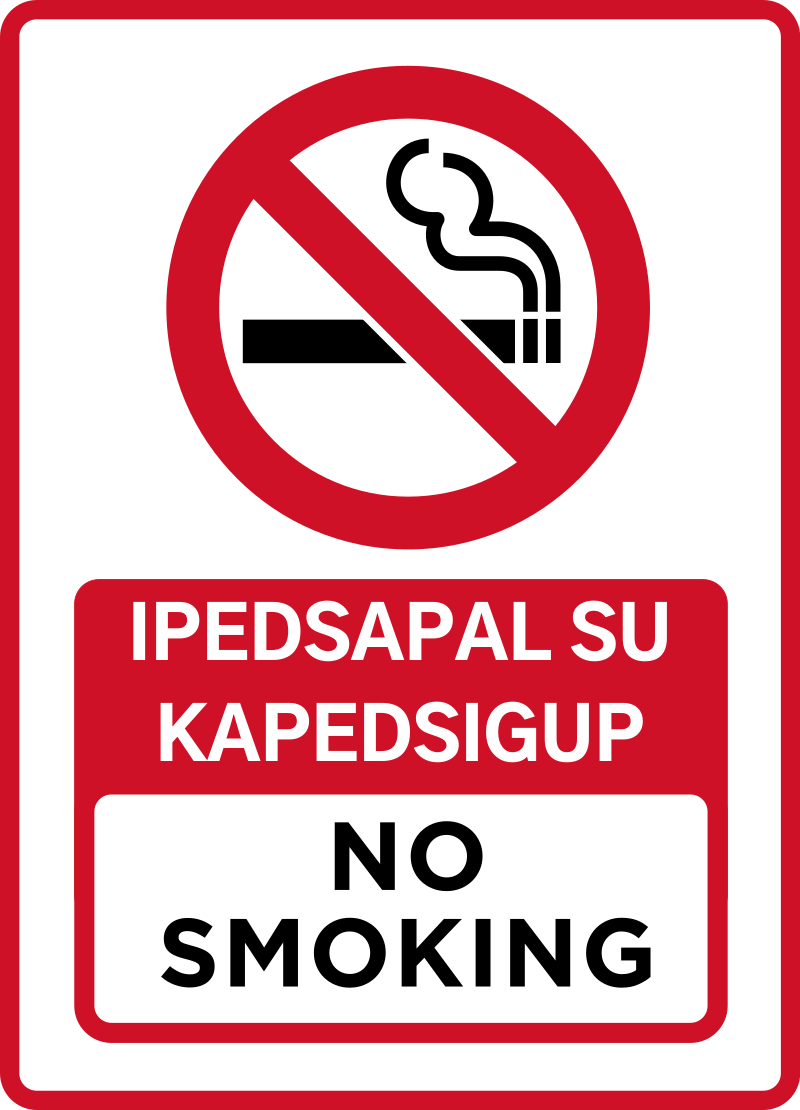
No smoking

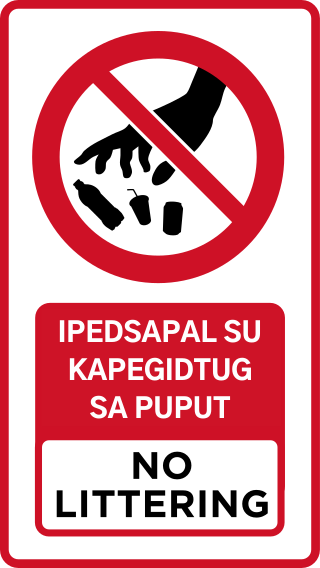
No littering

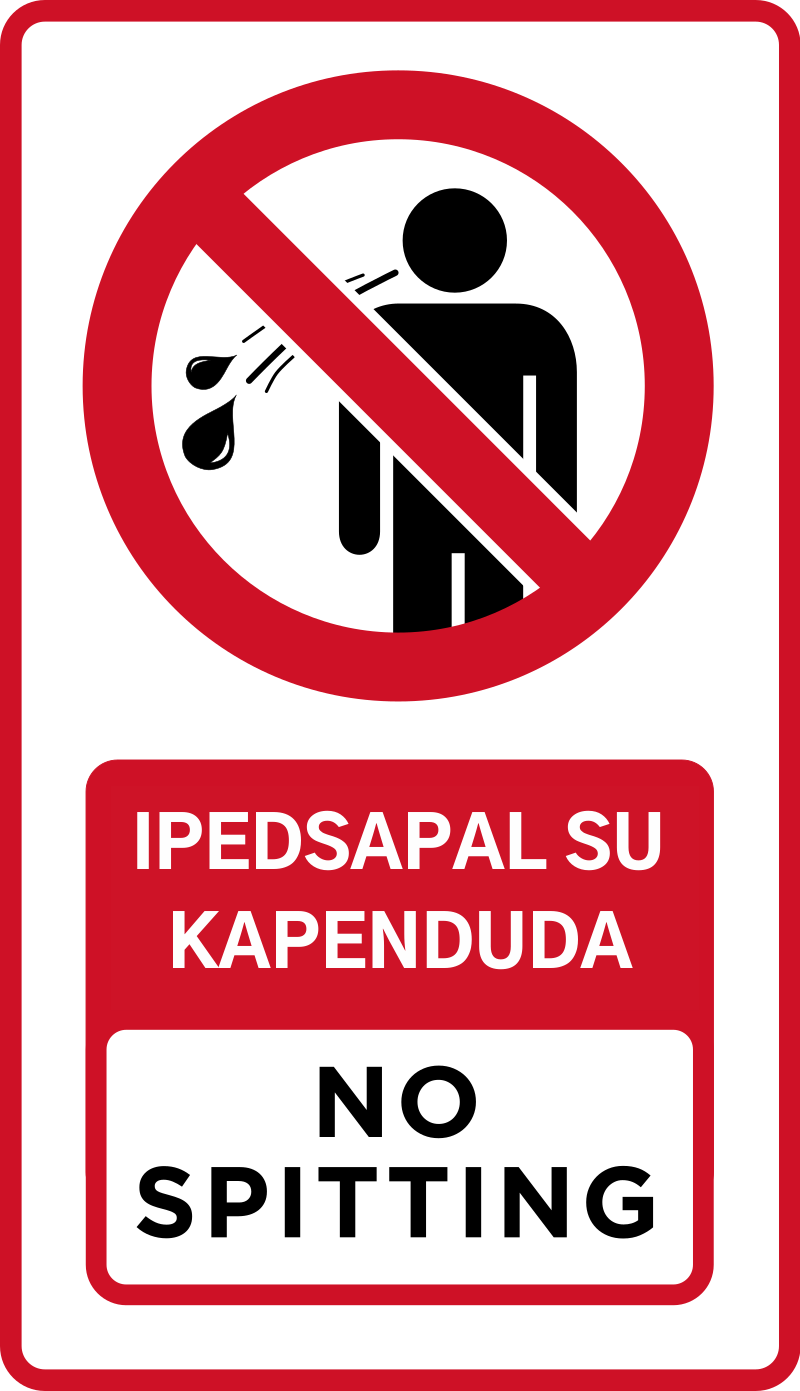
No spitting

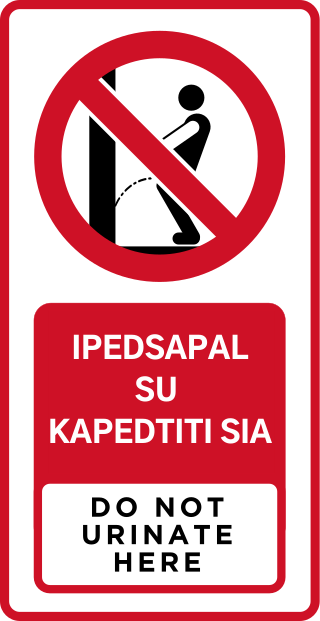
Do not urinate here

== Writing system ==
Maguindanao is written with the Latin script, and used to be written with the Jawi script. Among works on the language published by Jacinto Juanmartí, his sacred history Compendio de historia universal contains Maguindanao texts in both Jawi and the Latin script.

=== Latin ===
Maguindanaon alphabet – Latin script
Letter	Name	Sound
A	a	[a]
B	ba	[b]
D	da	[d]
E	e	[ə]
G	ga	[g]
H	ha	[h]
I	i	[i/e]
J	ja	[ʒ]
K	ka	[k]
L	la	[l]
M	ma	[m]
N	na	[n]
Ng	nga	[ŋ]
P	pa	[p]
R	ra	[ɾ/r]
S	sa	[s]
T	ta	[t]
U	u	[u/o]
W	wa	[w]
Y	ya	[j]
Z	za	[z]

=== Jawi ===
Maguindanaon alphabet – Jawi script
Character	Name
ا	alip
ب	ba
ت	ta
ث	t̲a
ج	jim
ح	ḥa
خ	xo
د	dal
ذ	ḏal
ر	ro
ز	zai
س	sin
ش	šin
ص	ṣod
ض	ḍod
ط	ṭo
ظ	ẓo
ع	'ain
غ	ǧain
ڠ	nga
ف	fa
ڨ	pa
ق	qaf
ک	kaf
ڬ	gaf
ل	lam
م	mim
ن	nun
و	wau
ه	ha
ء	hamza
ي	ya
ى	ye

== See also ==
- Languages of the Philippines
- Danao languages
- Maranao language
- Iranun language

== Bibliography ==
- Juanmartí, Jacinto (1892a). Diccionario moro-maguindanao-español [Moro-Maguindanao-Spanish dictionary] (in Spanish). Manila: Tipografía «Amigos del País».
- Juanmartí, Jacinto (1892b). Gramática de la lengua de maguindanao según se habla en el centro y en la costa sur de la isla de Mindanao [A grammar of the Maguindanao tongue according to the manner of speaking it in the interior and on the south coast of the island of Mindanao] (in Spanish). Manila: Tipografía «Amigos del País».
- Juanmartí, Jacinto (1906) [First published in Spanish 1892]. A Grammar of the Maguindanao Tongue According to the Manner of Speaking It in the Interior and on the South Coast of the Island of Mindanao. Translated by Smith, C. C. Washington: Government Printing Office.
- Porter, R. S. (1903). A Primer and Vocabulary of the Moro Dialect (Magindanau). Washington: Government Printing Office for the Bureau of Insular Affairs.
