= Tacurong =

Component city in Sultan Kudarat, Philippines

- Component city
- City of Tacurong

Other transcription(s)
  - Jawi: تكروڠ
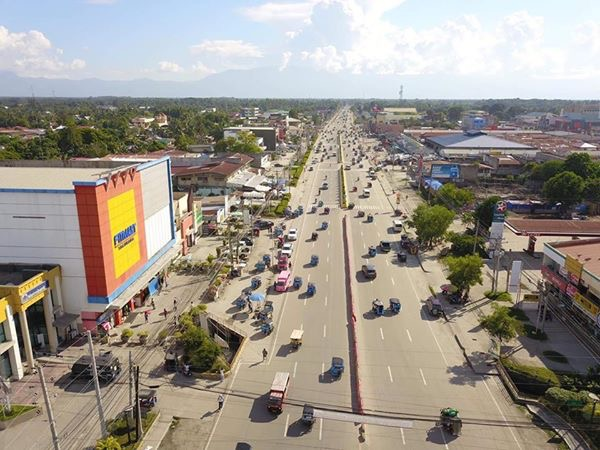
- Tacurong Road to Isulan

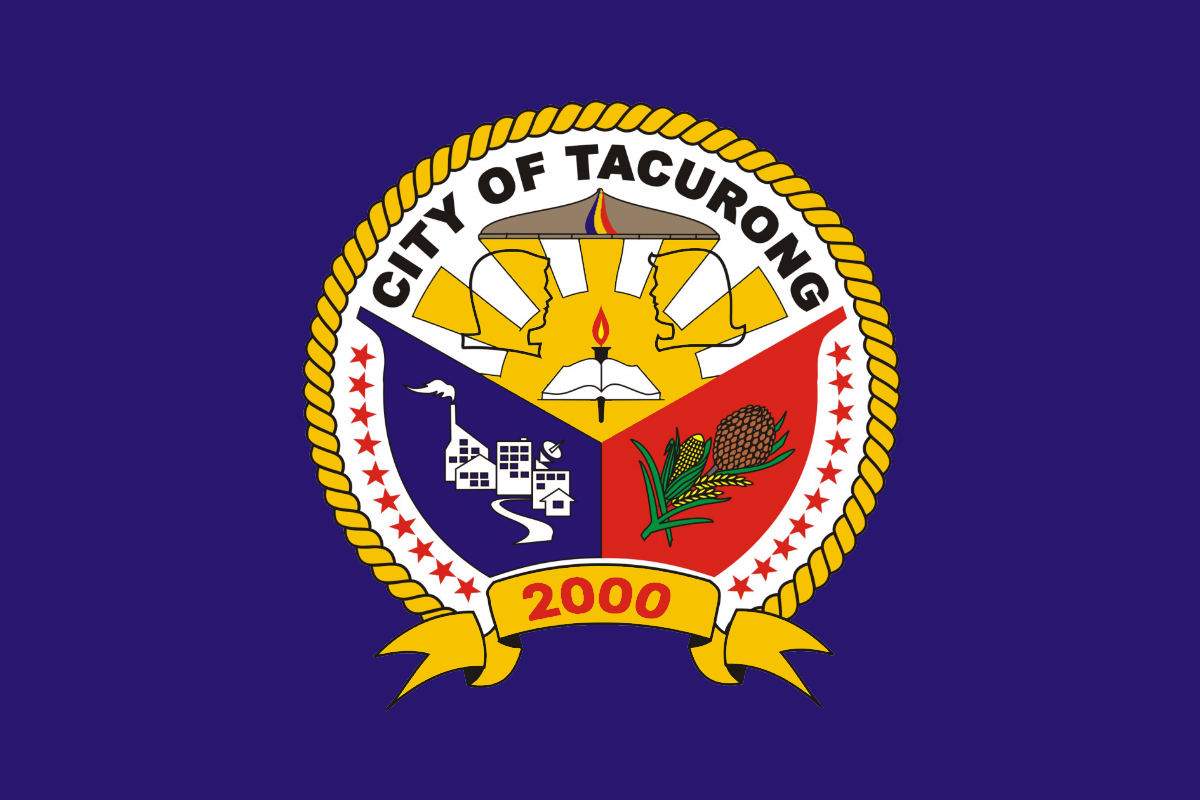
- Flag Seal
- Nickname: City of Goodwill
- Motto: Uswag Tacurong! (Progress Tacurong!)
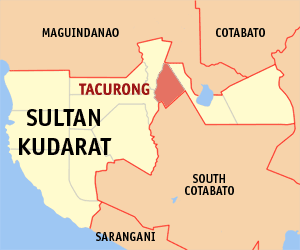
- Map of Sultan Kudarat with Tacurong highlighted
- Interactive map of Tacurong
- Location within the Philippines
- Coordinates: 6°41′18″N 124°40′43″E
- Country: Philippines
- Region: Soccsksargen
- Province: Sultan Kudarat
- District: 1st district
- Founded: August 3, 1951
- Cityhood: August 16, 2000
- Barangays: 20 (see Barangays)

Government
  - Type: Sangguniang Panlungsod
  - Mayor: Lina O. Montilla, Ph.D.
  - Vice Mayor: Ralen C. Tabusares - Bernardo
  - Representative: Ruth M. Sakaluran
  - City Council: Members: Ralen T. Bernardo; Lalaine J. Montilla; Jose A. Lim V; Harvey P. Legas; Carlos Borromeo P. Segura Jr.; Geronimo P. Arzagon; Bernardino L. Umadhay Jr.; Geraldine L. Collado; Nestor D. Casador; Remo Y. Flores
  - Electorate: 61,843 voters (2025)

Area
  - Total: 153.40 km^{2} (59.23 sq mi)
- Elevation: 71 m (233 ft)
- Highest elevation: 1,663 m (5,456 ft)
- Lowest elevation: 7 m (23 ft)

Population (2024 census)
  - Total: 116,945
  - Density: 762.35/km^{2} (1,974.5/sq mi)
  - Households: 25,261
- Demonym(s): Tacurongnon; Takurungen; Takur

Economy
  - Income class: 3rd city income class
  - Poverty incidence: 15.32% (2023)
  - Revenue: ₱ 1,012 million (2024)
  - Assets: ₱ 2,685 million (2024)
  - Expenditure: ₱ 926.5 million (2024)
  - Liabilities: ₱ 443.5 million (2024)

Service provider
  - Electricity: Sultan Kudarat Electric Cooperative (SUKELCO)
  - Water: Sultan Kudarat Water District (SKWD)
  - Cable TV: Sultan Cable System Inc. (SULCASI)
- Time zone: UTC+8 (PST)
- ZIP code: 9800
- PSGC: 126511000
- IDD : area code: +63 (0)64
- Native languages: Maguindanao; Hiligaynon; Tagalog
- Website: www.tacurong.gov.ph

Tacurong (/ˈtækʊrɒŋ/), officially the City of Tacurong (Hiligaynon: Dakbanwa sang Tacurong; Maguindanaon: Kuta nu Takurung, Jawi: كوت نو تكروڠ; Filipino: Lungsod ng Tacurong), is a component city in the province of Sultan Kudarat, Philippines. According to the 2024 census, it has a population of 116,945 people.

Tacurong has a total land area of 15,340 hectares, the smallest in land area among the province's 12 municipalities but the most populous. Tacurong became a component city of Sultan Kudarat in 2000 by virtue of Republic Act No. 8805 in September 2000.

== History ==
Tacurong was originally a barangay of the Municipality of Buluan. On August 3, 1951, it was created into a municipality by Executive Order Number 462 signed by the President Elpidio Quirino. At that time Tacurong covered an estimated area of 40,000 hectares and consisted of 14 barangays. In 1961, its southern portion was separated to form the Tantangan, and in 1973, some of its eastern areas were ceded with the creation of President Quirino.

=== Cityhood ===
Following the efforts of Angelo O. Montilla, the Congressman of the Legislative District of Sultan Kudarat, Tacurong was made the first component city in the Province of Sultan Kudarat in 2000 by virtue of House Bill No. 6497 and Republic Act 8805. This was confirmed by the “Takurs” in a plebiscite held on September 18, 2000.

=== Security incidents ===
Tacurong City has the most number of bombing incidents in Southern Philippines since 2000, as the city reportedly has the presence of different extortion and terrorist groups like Abu Sayyaf, BIFF and NPA.

New Year's Eve bombing
December 31, 2017, 11:05 PM, 2 casualties and 17 hurt during the Improvised Explosive Device blast in Villa Garde KTV Bar National Highway, Barangay Buenaflor.

April 3, 2017 bombing
Eight persons, mostly workers of an electric cooperative, were injured after an improvised bomb went off along the national highway in Tacurong City on Monday morning (Apr. 3), Bangsamoro Islamic Freedom Fighters (BIFF) is the suspected group who is responsible for the terrorist attack.

Twin bombing
Seven people were hurt after two explosions rocked Tacurong City on April 17, 2017, the first explosion took place at 6:40 p.m. on the rooftop of Dragon Gas Station along National Highway in Barangay Isabela. Minutes later, or at 7:10 p.m., another explosion occurred, this time at the gas station's compound.

February 2, 2016 bombing
Improvise explosive device (IED) rocked Tacurong City two hours after the convoy of vice presidential candidate Leni Robredo left the city on Tuesday afternoon. The bomb exploded around 2 p.m. near the national highway along Jose Abad Santos Street in Tacurong City. Three people were reportedly wounded.

Yellow bus bombing attempt
The powerful bomb fashioned from two 60 mm mortars as main charge and mobile phone as trigger mechanism was found at 10:50 a.m. April 2015 inside Yellow Bus Line unit with body number 9208 at a police checkpoint in Barangay Dos along the Tacurong-Isulan highway. The bus was heading toward Isulan from Tacurong City when subjected to inspection by police after Army and policemen received a report about the suspected bomb inside the bus.

November 6, 2022 bombing
A homemade bomb went off in a bus as it was approaching a transport terminal in Tacurong City. The explosion killed a passenger and wounded 10 others.

== Geography ==
Tacurong is in South Central Mindanao and the only city in the province of Sultan Kudarat. It is 92 kilometres (57 mi) from General Santos, 96 kilometres (60 mi) from Cotabato City and 178 kilometres (111 mi) from Davao City. It is situated at the crossroads of Davao-GenSan-Cotabato highways.

=== Barangays ===
Tacurong is politically subdivided into 20 barangays. Each barangay consists of puroks while some have sitios.

In 1951, the barrio of Katungal was divided into Upper Katungal and Tad-an, which was later on renamed as Lower Katungal. In 1990, Lower Katungal was renamed as Enrique J.C. Montilla.

Barangay Virginia Griño was formerly known as Gansing.

Name	PSGC	Population (2024)
Baras	126511001	3,815
Buenaflor	126511002	7,199
Calean	126511003	3,953
Carmen	126511004	4,109
D'Ledesma	126511005	1,564
Enrique J.C. Montilla	126511008	7,831
Kalandagan	126511007	3,279
Lancheta	126511023	1,475
New Isabela	126511010	3,2361
New Lagao	126511011	4,055
New Passi	126511012	3,123
Poblacion	126511013	15,969
Rajah Muda Mopak	126511014	3,947
San Antonio	126511015	1,507
San Emmanuel	126511016	8,462
San Pablo	126511019	20,1457
San Rafael	126511022	1,176
Tina	126511021	3,622
Upper Katungal	126511020	6,7676
Virginia Griño	126511006	9,676575

=== Climate ===
Climate data for Tacurong
Month	Jan	Feb	Mar	Apr	May	Jun	Jul	Aug	Sep	Oct	Nov	Dec	Year
Mean daily maximum °C (°F)	31 (88)	31 (88)	32 (90)	32 (90)	31 (88)	30 (86)	30 (86)	30 (86)	30 (86)	30 (86)	30 (86)	31 (88)	31 (87)
Mean daily minimum °C (°F)	23 (73)	23 (73)	23 (73)	24 (75)	24 (75)	24 (75)	24 (75)	24 (75)	24 (75)	24 (75)	24 (75)	23 (73)	24 (74)
Average precipitation mm (inches)	64 (2.5)	45 (1.8)	59 (2.3)	71 (2.8)	140 (5.5)	179 (7.0)	192 (7.6)	198 (7.8)	163 (6.4)	147 (5.8)	113 (4.4)	66 (2.6)	1,437 (56.5)
Average rainy days	12.2	10.3	12.7	15.7	26.0	27.4	28.1	28.2	26.0	26.7	22.9	16.6	252.8
Source: Meteoblue (modeled/calculated data, not measured locally)

== Demographics ==
Population census of Tacurong

Year	Pop.	±% p.a.
1960	15,051	—
1970	29,796	+7.06%
1975	37,255	+4.58%
1980	45,908	+4.26%

Year	Pop.	±% p.a.
1990	58,785	+2.50%
1995	69,822	+3.28%
2000	76,354	+1.94%
2007	82,546	+1.08%

Year	Pop.	±% p.a.
2010	89,188	+2.86%
2015	98,316	+1.87%
2020	109,319	+2.26%
2024	116,945	+1.63%

Source: Philippine Statistics Authority

Maguindanaons are the native inhabitants of Tacurong city while Hiligaynons are originally from Iloilo in Visayas.

== Economy ==
Poverty incidence of Tacurong (%)

Source: Philippine Statistics Authority

Tacurong City is the commercial hub of the province of Sultan Kudarat, catering the needs of nearby municipalities and the province of Maguindanao del Sur.

== Culture ==
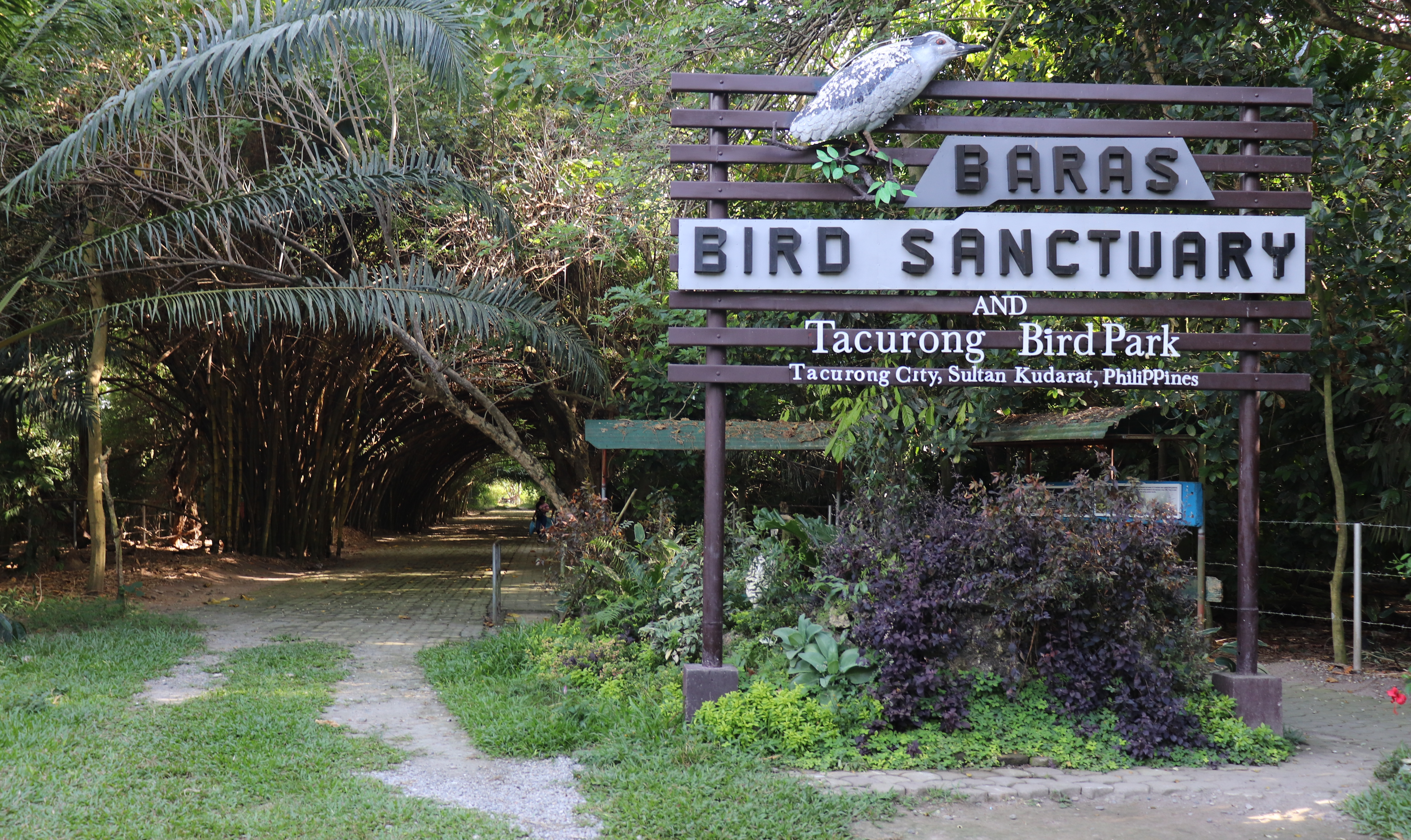
Baras Bird Sanctuary

Tacurong held the 8th "Sultan Kudarat Bird Festival" at the 2.5-hectare Baras Bird Sanctuary, the largest nesting site of 20,000 bird species, especially egrets and herons, on May 10–11, 2024.

== Education ==
Tacurong is the site of the Sultan Kudarat State University

== Notable personalities ==
- Chelsea Fernandez, beauty pageant titleholder

== Sister cities ==
- Iloilo City
- Cotabato City
