= Lake Buluan =

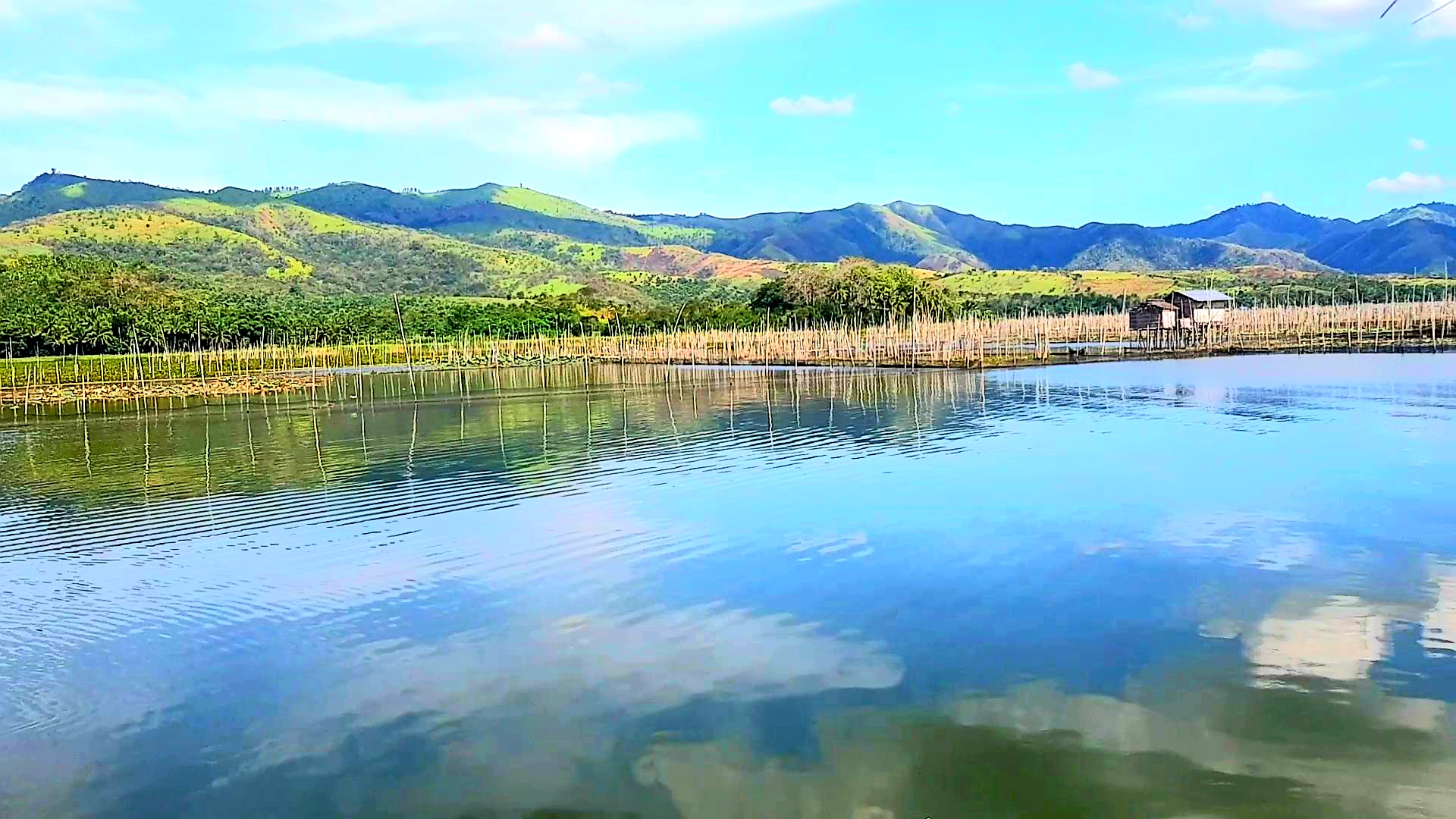

- Location within the Philippines Lake Buluan (Philippines)
- Location: Mindanao
- Coordinates: 6°38′26″N 124°49′30″E
- Type: Freshwater lake
- Primary inflows: Marbel River
- Basin countries: Philippines
- Surface area: 6,134 ha (61.34 km^{2})
- Average depth: 4.5 m (14.76 ft)
- Max. depth: 6 m (19.69 ft)
- Settlements: Buluan; Lutayan; Mangudadatu; President Quirino

Lake Buluan is a lake located on the island of Mindanao in the Philippines. With an estimated surface area of 61.34 square kilometres (23.68 sq mi), it is the third largest lake in Mindanao, after Lake Lanao and Lake Mainit. It has an average elevation of 4.5 metres (15 ft).

The lake is sandwiched between the provinces of Maguindanao del Sur and Sultan Kudarat. The lake falls under the political jurisdiction of the municipalities of Buluan and Mangudadatu of Maguindanao del Sur and President Quirino and Lutayan in Sultan Kudarat.

The lake consists of adjoining marshy basins of the Pulangi, Maanoy, Buluan, and Alah rivers, which are all tributaries of the Mindanao River.

== History ==
This lake was formerly surrounded by the Sultanate of Buayan before the American era.

== Species of fish ==
The following species of fish are found in the lake:

- Climbing gourami (Anabas testudineus)
- Snakehead murrel (Channa striata)
- Milkfish (Chanos chanos)
- Walking catfish (Clarias batrachus)
- Common carp (Cyprinus carpio carpio)
- Sundari bele (Glossogobius giuris)
- Mozambique tilapia (Oreochromis mossambicus)
- Spotte barb or common barb (Puntius binotatus)
- Snakeskin gourami (Trichopodus pectoralis)

== Environmental concerns ==
Mining operations in the nearby provinces of South Cotabato and Davao del Sur as well as Sultan Kudarat pose a threat to the lake habitat.

== See also ==
- List of protected areas of the Philippines
