= Lutayan =

Municipality in Sultan Kudarat, Philippines

- Municipality
- Municipality of Lutayan

Other transcription(s)
  - Jawi: لتاين
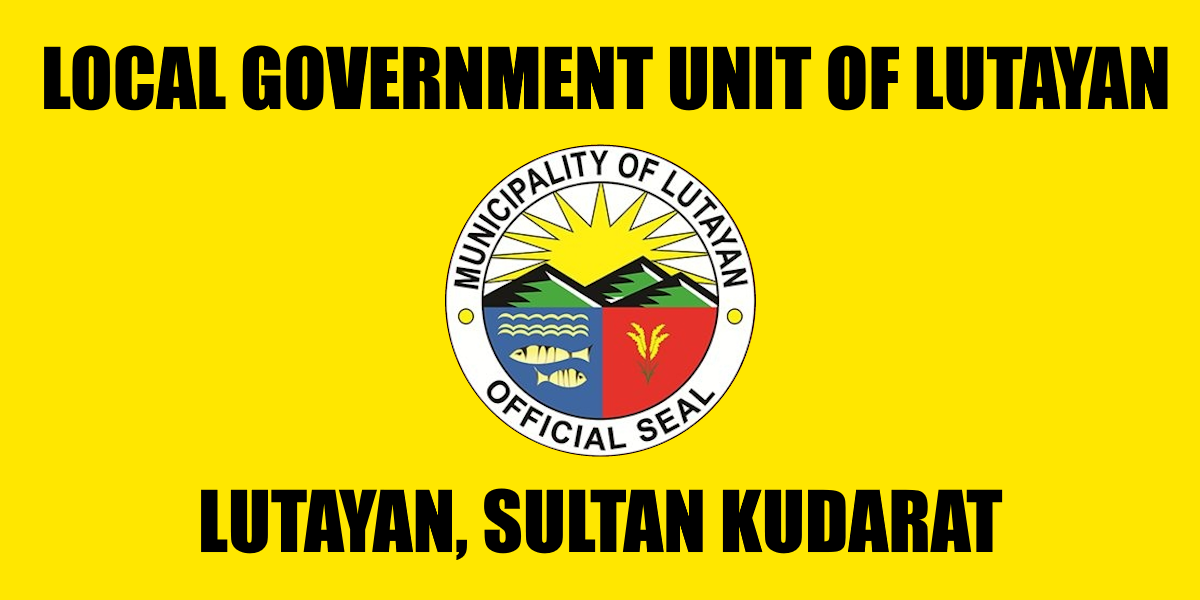
- Flag Seal

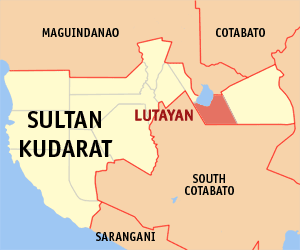
- Map of Sultan Kudarat with Lutayan highlighted
- Interactive map of Lutayan
- Location within the Philippines
- Coordinates: 6°33′36″N 124°51′32″E
- Country: Philippines
- Region: Soccsksargen
- Province: Sultan Kudarat
- District: 1st district
- Barangays: 11 (see Barangays)

Government
  - Type: Sangguniang Bayan
  - Mayor: Pax Mangudadatu
  - Vice Mayor: Datu Prince Raden M. Sakaluran
  - Representative: Bai Rihan M. Sakaluran
  - Municipal Council: Members: Yahyhjun K. Mangudadatu; Zacaria R. Macasayon; Tautin M. Dagloc; Normia M. Cadil; Kamid A. Paja; Prinz Aldon P. Ligo; Ronnie L. Genovia; Edgar C. Lacamento
  - Electorate: 37,184 voters (2025)

Area
  - Total: 271.00 km^{2} (104.63 sq mi)
- Elevation: 25 m (82 ft)
- Highest elevation: 66 m (217 ft)
- Lowest elevation: 7 m (23 ft)

Population (2024 census)
  - Total: 65,425
  - Density: 241.42/km^{2} (625.28/sq mi)
  - Households: 13,113

Economy
  - Income class: 1st municipal income class
  - Poverty incidence: 37.72% (2023)
  - Revenue: ₱ 272.6 million (2024)
  - Assets: ₱ 33.68 million (2024)
  - Expenditure: ₱ 252.4 million (2024)
  - Liabilities: ₱ 149.3 million (2024)

Service provider
  - Electricity: South Cotabato 1 Electric Cooperative (SOCOTECO 1)
- Time zone: UTC+8 (PST)
- ZIP code: 9803
- PSGC: 1206507000
- IDD : area code: +63 (0)64
- Native languages: Hiligaynon; Maguindanao; Tagalog
- Website: www.lutayan.gov.ph

Lutayan, officially the Municipality of Lutayan (Hiligaynon: Banwa sang Lutayan; Maguindanaon: Inged nu Lutayan, Jawi: ايڠد نو لتاين; Tagalog: Bayan ng Lutayan), is a municipality in the province of Sultan Kudarat, Philippines. According to the 2024 census, it has a population of 65,425 people.

This lakeside town shares Lake Buluan with its neighboring municipality, Buluan, Maguindanao del Sur. Lutayan was created from Buluan on May 8, 1967. The first appointed mayor was Datu Datucan Rajahbuayan Mapayag, while the first elected mayor was the wife of the mayor of Buluan.

== Geography ==
=== Barangays ===
Lutayan is politically subdivided into 12 barangays. Each barangay consists of puroks while some have sitios.

- Antong
- Bayasong
- Blingkong
- Lutayan Proper
- Maindang
- Mamali
- Manili
- Mangudadatu
- Palavilla
- Sampao
- Sisiman
- Tamnag (Poblacion)

=== Climate ===
Climate data for Lutayan, Sultan Kudarat
Month	Jan	Feb	Mar	Apr	May	Jun	Jul	Aug	Sep	Oct	Nov	Dec	Year
Mean daily maximum °C (°F)	31 (88)	31 (88)	32 (90)	32 (90)	31 (88)	30 (86)	30 (86)	30 (86)	30 (86)	30 (86)	30 (86)	31 (88)	31 (87)
Mean daily minimum °C (°F)	23 (73)	23 (73)	23 (73)	24 (75)	24 (75)	24 (75)	24 (75)	24 (75)	24 (75)	24 (75)	24 (75)	23 (73)	24 (74)
Average precipitation mm (inches)	64 (2.5)	45 (1.8)	59 (2.3)	71 (2.8)	140 (5.5)	179 (7.0)	192 (7.6)	198 (7.8)	163 (6.4)	147 (5.8)	113 (4.4)	66 (2.6)	1,437 (56.5)
Average rainy days	12.2	10.3	12.7	15.7	26.0	27.4	28.1	28.2	26.0	26.7	22.9	16.6	252.8
Source: Meteoblue

== Demographics ==
Population census of Lutayan
Year	Pop.	±% p.a.
1970	9,581	—
1975	6,730	−6.84%
1980	19,090	+23.18%
1990	30,276	+4.72%
1995	34,654	+2.56%
2000	40,881	+3.61%
2007	51,640	+3.27%
2010	56,179	+3.11%
2015	63,029	+2.22%
2020	65,644	+0.86%
2024	65,425	−0.08%
Source: Philippine Statistics Authority

== Economy ==
Poverty incidence of Lutayan (%)

Source: Philippine Statistics Authority
