= Lambayong =

Municipality in Sultan Kudarat, Philippines

- Municipality
- Municipality of Lambayong

Other transcription(s)
  - Jawi: لمبايوڠ
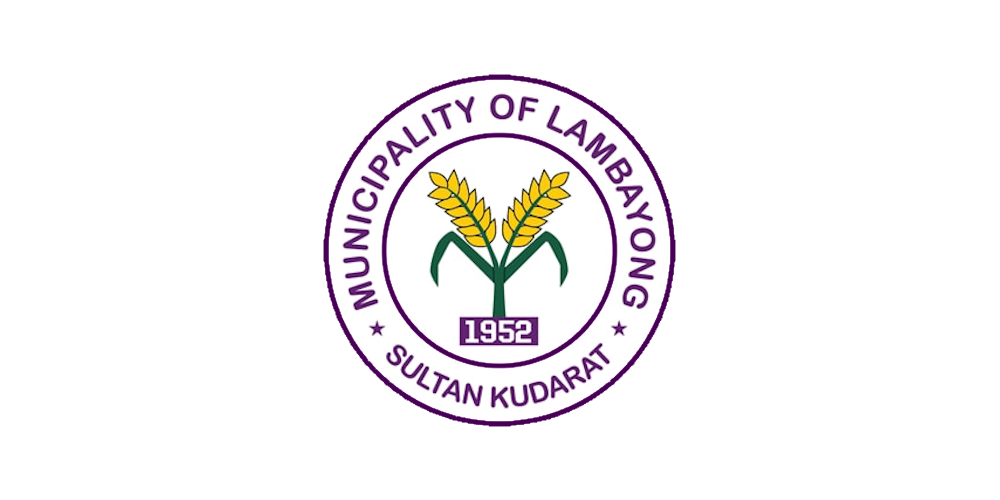
- Flag Seal
- Motto: Agpintas ka Lambayong
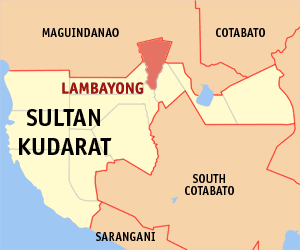
- Map of Sultan Kudarat with Lambayong highlighted
- Interactive map of Lambayong
- Location within the Philippines
- Coordinates: 6°48′N 124°38′E
- Country: Philippines
- Region: Soccsksargen
- Province: Sultan Kudarat
- District: 1st district
- Founded: November 22, 1973
- Renamed: October 12, 1988 (as Lambayong)
- Barangays: 26 (see Barangays)

Government
  - Type: Sangguniang Bayan
  - Mayor: Ferdinand G. Agduma
  - Vice Mayor: Francis Eric E. Recinto
  - Representative: Bai Rihan M. Sakaluran
  - Municipal Council: Members: Arnold A. Guerrero; Joseph Leo E. Recinto; Duane Jane M. Abalos; Abdulatip B. Mangindra; Jay Eleazar L. Toreja; Jaime A. Baldonado; Ronaldo Z. Recinto; Jose Ernest B. Bandigan; Norhato P. Sanday; Abraham S. Albento
  - Electorate: 51,726 voters (2025)

Area
  - Total: 226.88 km^{2} (87.60 sq mi)
- Elevation: 25 m (82 ft)
- Highest elevation: 49 m (161 ft)
- Lowest elevation: 14 m (46 ft)

Population (2024 census)
  - Total: 81,288
  - Density: 358.29/km^{2} (927.96/sq mi)
  - Households: 20,143

Economy
  - Income class: 1st municipal income class
  - Poverty incidence: 24.74% (2023)
  - Revenue: ₱ 334.3 million (2024)
  - Assets: ₱ 1,106 million (2024)
  - Expenditure: ₱ 284.3 million (2024)
  - Liabilities: ₱ 627.2 million (2024)

Service provider
  - Electricity: Sultan Kudarat Electric Cooperative (SUKELCO)
- Time zone: UTC+8 (PST)
- ZIP code: 9802
- PSGC: 1206508000
- IDD : area code: +63 (0)64
- Native languages: Hiligaynon; Maguindanao; Tagalog

Lambayong, officially the Municipality of Lambayong (Hiligaynon: Banwa sang Lambayong; Ilocano: Ili ti Lambayong; Maguindanaon: Inged nu Lambayung, Jawi: ايڠد نولمبايوڠ; Tagalog: Bayan ng Lambayong), is a municipality in the province of Sultan Kudarat, Philippines. According to the 2024 census, it has a population of 81,288 people.

== Etymology ==
Lambayong is named after the lambayong (Ipomoea pes-caprae), the flower-bearing creeper that grows in profusion on wet lands with which the town has plenty. The purplish cup-like petals are a sight to behold from a distance as they undulate with the dark waxy-textured green leaves when blown by the wind.

The word Lambayong/Lambayung in Maguindanaon means purple.

== History ==
Area presently under the jurisdiction of Lambayong was transferred from the province of Cotabato to the province of Sultan Kudarat on November 22, 1973, by virtue of Presidential Decree No. 341 of President Ferdinand Marcos. It was established as a new municipality named Mariano Marcos in honor of the President's father.

On October 12, 1988, President Corazon Aquino signed Republic Act No. 6676, officially renaming the municipality to its present name.

== Geography ==
=== Barangays ===
Lambayong is politically subdivided into 26 barangays. Each barangay consists of puroks while some have sitios.

- Caridad (Cuyapon)
- Didtaras
- Gansing (Bilumen)
- Kabulakan
- Kapingkong
- Katitisan
- Lagao
- Lilit
- Madanding
- Maligaya
- Mamali
- Matiompong
- Midtapok
- New Cebu
- Palumbi
- Pidtiguian
- Pimbalayan
- Pinguiaman
- Poblacion (Lambayong)
- Sadsalan
- Seneben
- Sigayan
- Tambak Mopak
- Tinumigues
- Tumiao (Tinaga)
- Udtong

=== Climate ===
Climate data for Lambayong, Sultan Kudarat
Month	Jan	Feb	Mar	Apr	May	Jun	Jul	Aug	Sep	Oct	Nov	Dec	Year
Mean daily maximum °C (°F)	25 (77)	25 (77)	26 (79)	27 (81)	26 (79)	25 (77)	24 (75)	25 (77)	25 (77)	25 (77)	25 (77)	25 (77)	25 (78)
Mean daily minimum °C (°F)	18 (64)	18 (64)	18 (64)	18 (64)	19 (66)	19 (66)	19 (66)	19 (66)	19 (66)	19 (66)	18 (64)	18 (64)	19 (65)
Average precipitation mm (inches)	59 (2.3)	46 (1.8)	41 (1.6)	54 (2.1)	105 (4.1)	159 (6.3)	179 (7.0)	197 (7.8)	162 (6.4)	147 (5.8)	102 (4.0)	65 (2.6)	1,316 (51.8)
Average rainy days	12.3	11.7	12.2	14.5	22.6	25.6	26.6	27.5	25.5	26.0	21.2	16.0	241.7
Source: Meteoblue

== Demographics ==
Population census of Lambayong
Year	Pop.	±% p.a.
1975	26,301	—
1980	29,694	+2.46%
1990	39,182	+2.81%
1995	46,636	+3.32%
2000	51,192	+2.02%
2007	60,372	+2.30%
2010	65,557	+3.04%
2015	77,013	+3.11%
2020	79,739	+0.73%
2024	81,288	+0.46%
Source: Philippine Statistics Authority

Unlike the rest of Sultan Kudarat, Ilocano-speaking residents form the majority of Lambayong, with majority of them can speak and understand fluent Hiligaynon, Tagalog and to the some extent, Cebuano and Maguindanaon, in addition to their own native language. They descended from Ilocanos from northern Luzon who settled in the area since the early 1900s, with the additional influx of these migrants who also settled after World War II. Hiligaynon-speakers are also residents in the municipality, with many of them can also speak and understand Ilocano, Karay-a, Cebuano and Maguindanaon, since Lambayong—like the rest of Sultan Kudarat as well as Soccsksargen and the rest of Mindanao as a whole—is a melting pot of languages, culture and tradition. Other ethnolinguistic groups in the municipality are Maguindanaons, Cebuanos, Blaans and Manobos.

== Economy ==
Poverty incidence of Lambayong (%)

Source: Philippine Statistics Authority
