= Columbio =

Municipality in Sultan Kudarat, Philippines

- Municipality
- Municipality of Columbio

Other transcription(s)
  - Jawi: کلومبيو
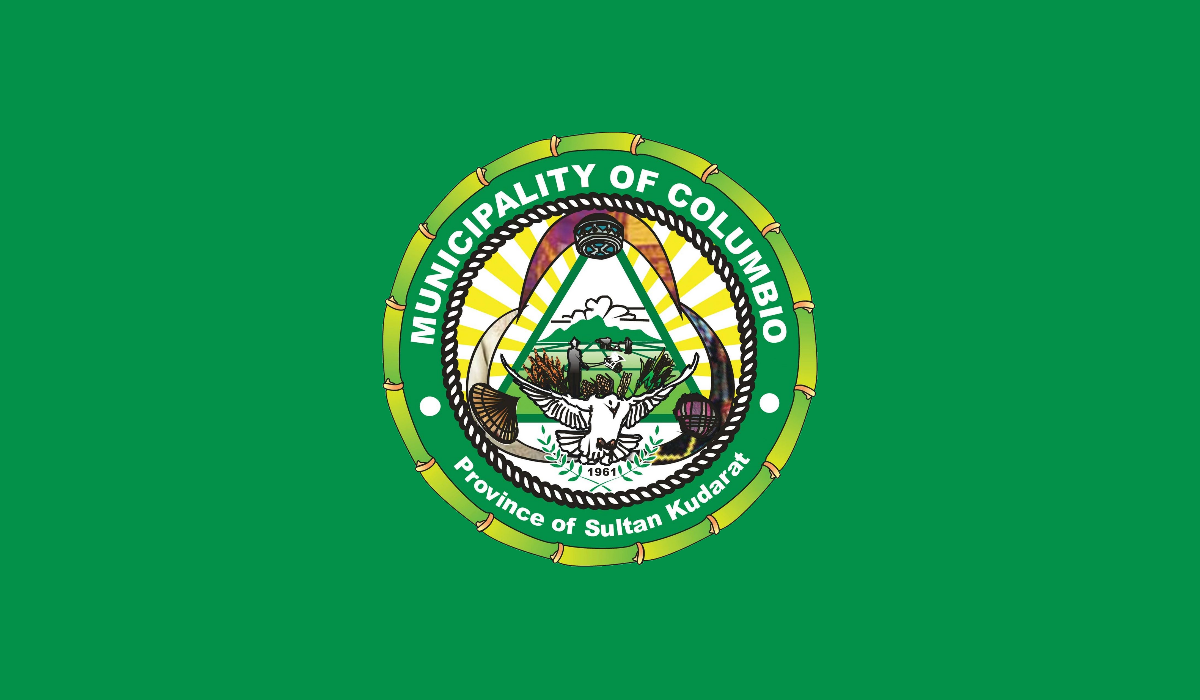
- Flag Seal
- Nicknames: Bridge to the Cotabatos; SK's Last Frontier
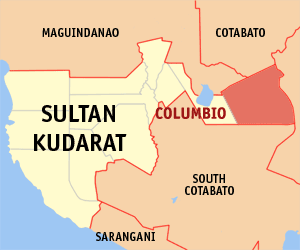
- Map of Sultan Kudarat with Columbio highlighted
- Interactive map of Columbio
- Location within the Philippines
- Coordinates: 6°41′09″N 124°57′40″E
- Country: Philippines
- Region: Soccsksargen
- Province: Sultan Kudarat
- District: 1st district
- Barangays: 16 (see Barangays)

Government
  - Type: Sangguniang Bayan
  - Mayor: Amirh M. Musali
  - Vice Mayor: Tondatu Dats Mangudadatu
  - Representative: Bai Rihan M. Sakaluran
  - Municipal Council: Members: Zahara Gin M. Paglas; Zahir Akmad M. Mamalinta; Saturnino V. Iglesias; Paidza E. Mangudadatu; Robert L. Layal; Abdulmullah A. Salendab; Lelany L. Lopez; Abdulbasit M. Dalgan
  - Electorate: 22,709 voters (2025)

Area
  - Total: 926.15 km^{2} (357.59 sq mi)
- Elevation: 143 m (469 ft)
- Highest elevation: 492 m (1,614 ft)
- Lowest elevation: 39 m (128 ft)

Population (2024 census)
  - Total: 33,337
  - Density: 35.995/km^{2} (93.227/sq mi)
  - Households: 8,149

Economy
  - Income class: 1st municipal income class
  - Poverty incidence: 35.43% (2023)
  - Revenue: ₱ 302.8 million (2022)
  - Assets: ₱ 327.6 million (2022)
  - Expenditure: ₱ 282.7 million (2022)
  - Liabilities: ₱ 140.9 million (2022)

Service provider
  - Electricity: Sultan Kudarat Electric Cooperative (SUKELCO)
- Time zone: UTC+8 (PST)
- ZIP code: 9801
- PSGC: 1206502000
- IDD : area code: +63 (0)64
- Native languages: Hiligaynon; Maguindanao; Kalagan; Tagalog
- Website: www.columbio.gov.ph

Columbio, officially the Municipality of Columbio (Hiligaynon: Banwa sang Columbio; Ilocano: Ili ti Columbio; Maguindanaon: Inged nu Kulumbiu, Jawi: ايڠد نوکلومبيو; Tagalog: Bayan ng Columbio), is a municipality in Sultan Kudarat, Philippines. According to the 2024 census, it has a population of 33,337 people, making it the least populated municipality in the province.

== History ==
The municipality of Columbio was transferred from Cotabato Province to Province of Sultan Kudarat on November 22, 1973, by presidential decree 341 by President Ferdinand E. Marcos.

== Geography ==
=== Barangays ===
Columbio is politically subdivided into 16 barangays. Each barangay consists of puroks while some have sitios.

- Bantangan (Lasak)
- Datablao
- Eday
- Elbebe
- Lasak
- Libertad
- Lomoyon
- Makat (Sumali Pas)
- Maligaya
- Mayo
- Natividad
- Poblacion
- Polomolok
- Sinapulan
- Sucob
- Telafas

=== Climate ===
Climate data for Columbio, Sultan Kudarat
| Month | Jan | Feb | Mar | Apr | May | Jun | Jul | Aug | Sep | Oct | Nov | Dec | Year |
|---|---|---|---|---|---|---|---|---|---|---|---|---|---|
| Mean daily maximum °C (°F) | 30 (86) | 30 (86) | 31 (88) | 32 (90) | 31 (88) | 30 (86) | 29 (84) | 30 (86) | 30 (86) | 30 (86) | 30 (86) | 30 (86) | 30 (87) |
| Mean daily minimum °C (°F) | 23 (73) | 23 (73) | 23 (73) | 23 (73) | 24 (75) | 24 (75) | 23 (73) | 24 (75) | 24 (75) | 24 (75) | 23 (73) | 23 (73) | 23 (74) |
| Average precipitation mm (inches) | 59 (2.3) | 46 (1.8) | 41 (1.6) | 54 (2.1) | 105 (4.1) | 159 (6.3) | 179 (7.0) | 197 (7.8) | 162 (6.4) | 147 (5.8) | 102 (4.0) | 65 (2.6) | 1,316 (51.8) |
| Average rainy days | 12.3 | 11.7 | 12.2 | 14.5 | 22.6 | 25.6 | 26.6 | 27.5 | 25.5 | 26.0 | 21.2 | 16.0 | 241.7 |
Source: Meteoblue (modeled/calculated data, not measured locally)

== Demographics ==
Population census of Columbio
| Year | Pop. | ±% p.a. |
|---|---|---|
| 1970 | 20,748 | — |
| 1975 | 6,467 | −20.85% |
| 1980 | 7,927 | +4.15% |
| 1990 | 17,567 | +8.28% |
| 1995 | 21,511 | +3.87% |
| 2000 | 21,698 | +0.19% |
| 2007 | 23,675 | +1.21% |
| 2010 | 27,440 | +5.52% |
| 2015 | 33,258 | +3.73% |
| 2020 | 33,527 | +0.17% |
| 2024 | 33,337 | −0.14% |
Source: Philippine Statistics Authority

Columbio is inhabited by ethnolinguistic groups such as the Hiligaynons, Ilocanos, Cebuanos, Blaan and Maguindanaon. Ilocanos and Hiligaynons are the only inhabitants of the town not native to Mindanao. They speak and understand their respective languages and even communicate with one's own language to the other despite not mutually intelligible to each other. Maguindanaon, Blaan and Cebuano are also spoken by these respective ethnic groups and understood also by Ilocanos and Hiligaynons as well in the municipality. Everyone in the municipality also speak Tagalog.

== Economy ==
Poverty incidence of Columbio (%)

Source: Philippine Statistics Authority
