= Sultan Kudarat =

Province in Soccsksargen, Philippines

- Province

Other transcription(s)
  - Jawi: سولتان كودرت
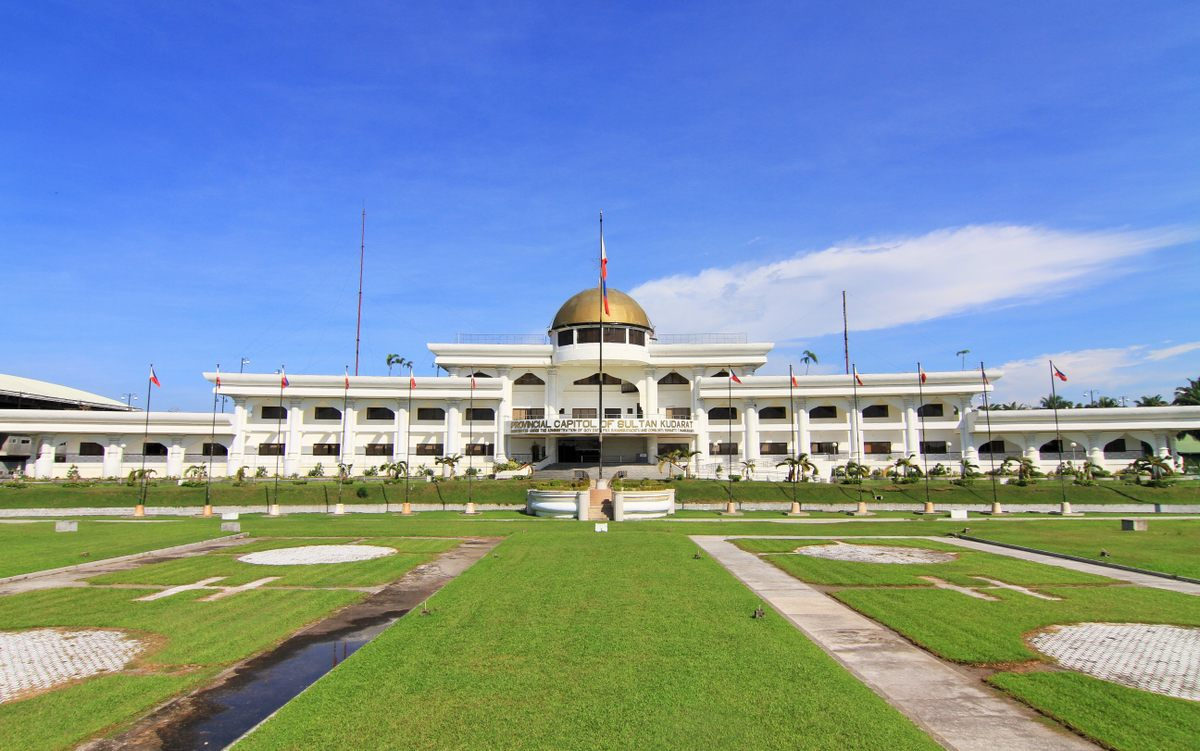
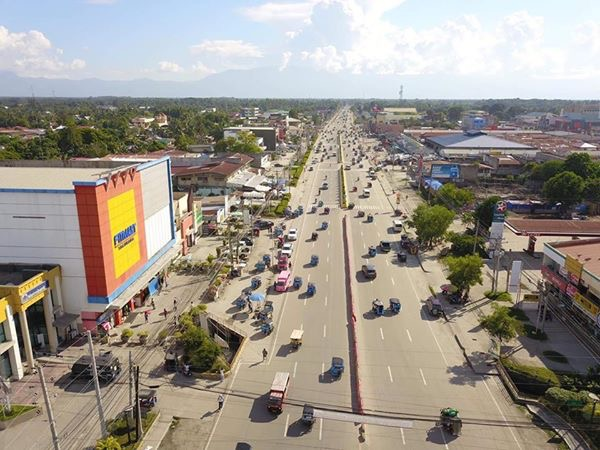
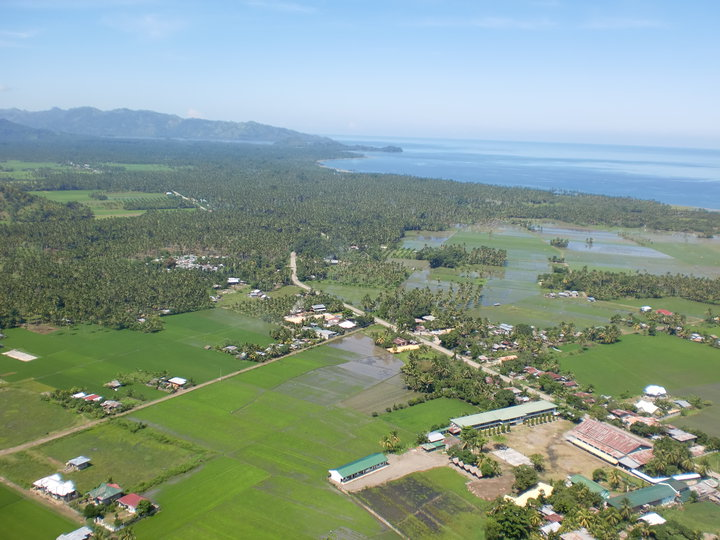
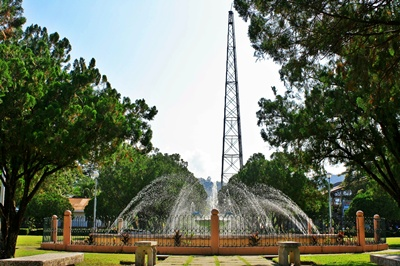
- (from top: left to right) Sultan Kudarat Provincial Capitol, Tacurong, Aerial view of Lebak, and Public Park in Kalamansig.

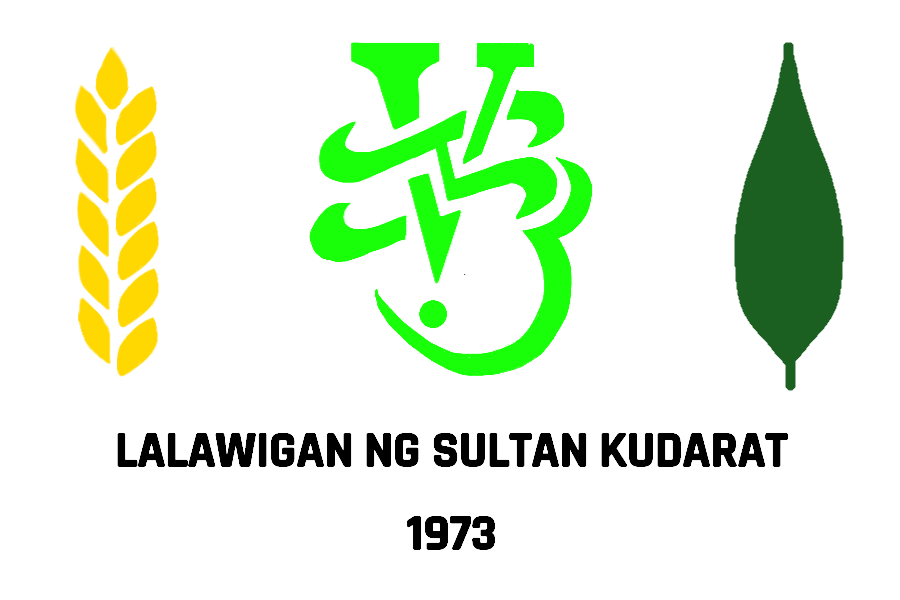
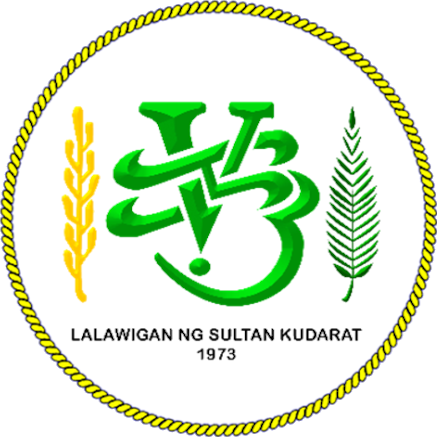
- Flag Seal
- Motto: SK Sikat Ka
- Location in the Philippines
- Interactive map of Sultan Kudarat
- Coordinates: 6°33′N 124°17′E
- Country: Philippines
- Region: Soccsksargen
- Founded: November 22, 1973
- Named for: Sultan Muhammad Dipatuan Kudarat
- Capital: Isulan
- Largest city: Tacurong

Government
  - Type: Sangguniang Panlalawigan
  - Governor: Datu Pax Ali S. Mangudadatu
  - Vice Governor: Prince Raden M. Sakaluran
  - Legislature: Sultan Kudarat Provincial Board
  - Electorate: 533,384 voters (2025)

Area
  - Total: 5,298.34 km^{2} (2,045.70 sq mi)
  - Rank: 18th out of 82
- Highest elevation (Mount Pitot Kalabaw): 1,503 m (4,931 ft)

Population (2024 census)
  - Total: 863,651
  - Rank: 34th out of 82
  - Density: 163.004/km^{2} (422.179/sq mi)
  - Rank: 56th out of 82
  - Households: 202,813
- Demonym(s): Sultan Kudarateño; Sultan Kudaratnon

Divisions
  - Independent cities: 0
  - Component cities: 1: Tacurong
  - Municipalities: 11: Bagumbayan; Columbio; Esperanza; Isulan; Kalamansig; Lambayong; Lebak; Lutayan; Palimbang; President Quirino; Senator Ninoy Aquino
  - Barangays: 249
  - Districts: Legislative districts of Sultan Kudarat

Economy
  - Income class: 1st provincial income class
  - Poverty incidence: 26.4% (2023)
  - Revenue: ₱ 2,731 million (2024)
  - Assets: ₱ 6,689 million (2024)
  - Expenditure: ₱ 2,312 million (2024)
  - Liabilities: ₱ 1,998 million (2024)
- Time zone: UTC+8 (PHT)
- PSGC: 126500000
- IDD : area code: +63 (0)64
- ISO 3166 code: PH-SUK
- Spoken languages: Hiligaynon; Maguindanaon; Karay-a; Ilocano; Cebuano; Blaan; Teduray; Dulangan Manobo; Tagalog; English
- Website: sultankudaratprovince.gov.ph

Sultan Kudarat, officially the Province of Sultan Kudarat, (Note: Hiligaynon: Kapuoran sang Sultan Kudarat; Maguindanaon: Dairat nu Sultan Kudarat, Jawi: دايرت نو سولتان كودرت; Cebuano: Lalawigan sa Sultan Kudarat; Ilocano: Probinsia ti Sultan Kudarat; Filipino: Lalawigan ng Sultan Kudarat) is a province in the Philippines located in the Soccsksargen region in Mindanao. According to the 2024 census, it had a population of 863,651 people. The province capital is Isulan while the commercial center and largest city is Tacurong.

== Etymology ==
The name Sultan Kudarat given to the province was derived from the Maguindanaon Muslim ruler, Sultan Muhammad Dipatuan Kudarat who began to assert his leadership in the year 1619 and reigned in the Sultanate of Maguindanao from 1625 to 1671. Through his leadership, Spanish forces were successfully repelled from encroaching the Cotabato region of south-central Mindanao. He is considered a national hero, and in his honor, the province was named after him.

== History ==
Sultan Kudarat was once part of the Sultanate of Maguindanao. It became one of the strongholds of the Maguindanao society as some royal families established their own Sultanate in the region.

Sultan Kudarat was part of the former province of Cotabato, until its creation as an independent province (along with Maguindanao and North Cotabato) on November 22, 1973, through Presidential Decree No. 341.

Sultan Kudarat was transferred from Central Mindanao region to the Autonomous Region in Muslim Mindanao (ARMM) after its creation in 1989. On December 18, 1998, Sultan Kudarat was transferred back to Central Mindanao through Republic Act No. 8744, until Central Mindanao was renamed Soccsksargen in 2001.

=== Palimbang Massacre ===
One notable event that took place in Sultan Kudarat was the Palimbang Massacre (also called the Malisbong Masjid Massacre), which saw the mass murder of Moro residents of Barrio Malisbong in Palimbang by units of the Philippine Military on September 24, 1974,–1,500 two years after Ferdinand Marcos declared martial law. Accounts compiled by the Moro Women's Center in General Santos state that 1,500 male Moros aged 11–70 were killed inside a mosque, 3,000 women and children aged 9–60 were detained – with the women being raped – and 300 houses were razed by the government forces.

==== Sultan Kudarat (Tacurong) Bird Festival ====
On May 10 and 11 of 2024, Tacurong held the 8th "Sultan Kudarat Bird Festival" at the 2.5-hectare Baras Bird Sanctuary, the largest nesting site of 20,000 bird species, particularly those of egrets and herons.

== Geography ==
Sultan Kudarat is situated in the southwestern section of central Mindanao. It is bounded on the north by the provinces of Maguindanao del Norte, Maguindanao del Sur and Cotabato; on the south by South Cotabato and Sarangani; on the east by Davao del Sur; and on the west by the Moro Gulf and the Celebes Sea. The province's total land area is 5,298.34 square kilometres (2,045.70 sq mi).

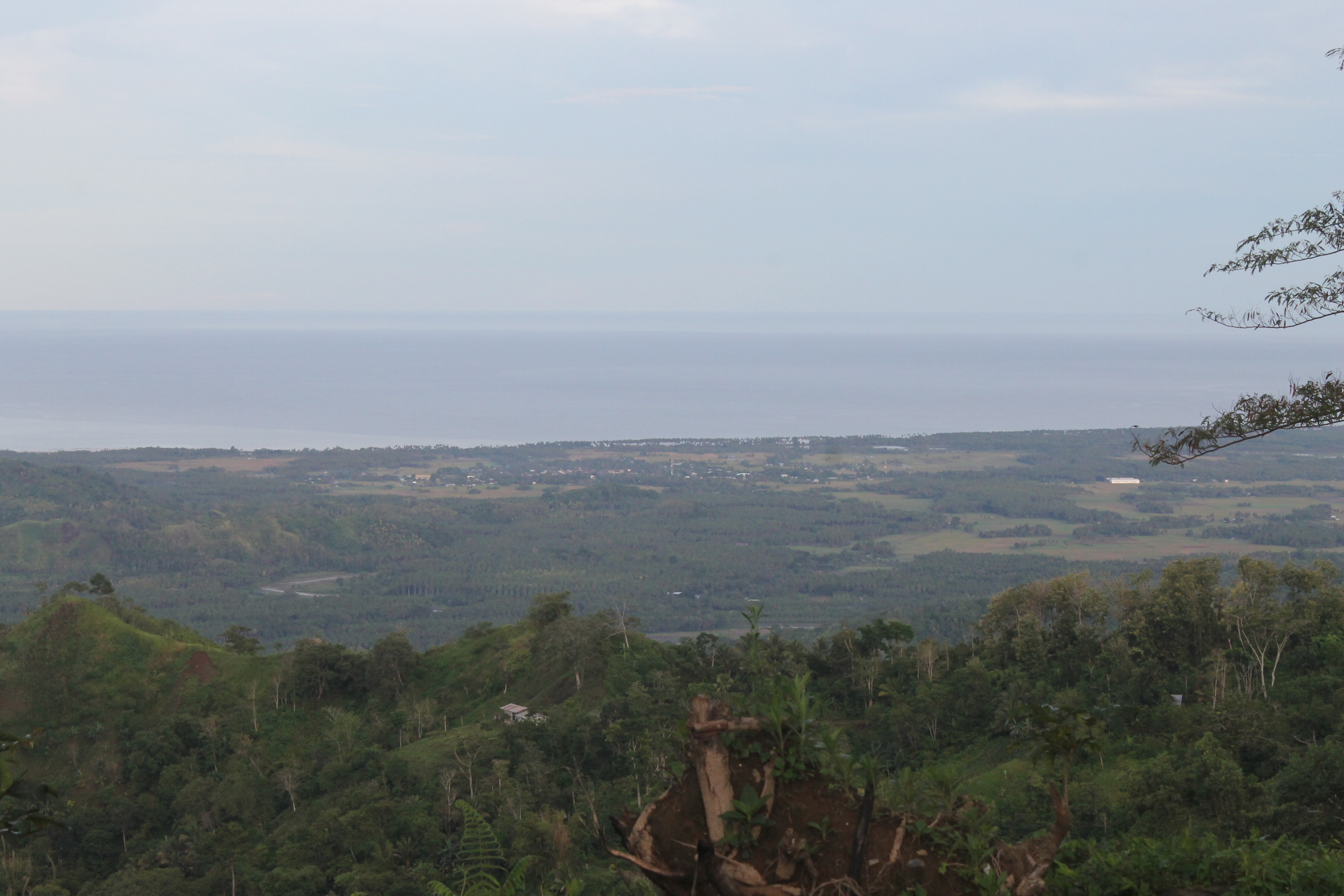
The Moro Gulf seen from Lebak

Two major mountain ranges encompass the province; the Alip Mountain Range in Columbio and the Daguma Mountain Range within the towns of Bagumbayan, Isulan, and Esperanza. The three coastal towns on the province's western side (Lebak, Kalamansig, and Palimbang) are lined with mountain ranges that separate the central part of the province from the sea. There are also mountains on the eastern side, leaving flat land in between.

The province has an irregular coastline of 132 kilometres (82 mi) in its three coastal towns, which face the Celebes Sea. These coastal areas are prone to tsunamis coming from the Celebes Sea. Approximately 2/3 of Lake Buluan's area is covered by the province in the towns of Lutayan and President Quirino. There are 7 major rivers within the province: Alip, Allah, Kapingkong, Tran, Salaman, Palimbang and Kabulnan. Additionally, there are 23 large creeks and 11 major springs within the province.

=== Land use and soil types ===
Forestland constitutes the majority of the province's land use (50.32% ), followed by agricultural land (44.77%), fishing grounds (2.42%), non-agricultural land (1.16%), "other bodies of water" (1.02%), and fishponds (0.31%).

Five major soil types are found within the province, the majority of which is classified as Mountain Soil (71%), followed by Sandy Loam (12.036%), Silty Clay Loam (4.880%), Clay Loam (4.612%) and Loamy Sand (0.185).

=== Climate ===
The climate of Sultan Kudarat falls under Type IV of Climate (characterized by rain showers or evenly distributed rainfall throughout the year). Heavy rainfall occurs from April to November. Unlike most other provinces in the country, Sultan Kudarat is generally free from typhoons as it is situated outside the "typhoon belt".

The average temperature is 35 °C (95 °F), with 38 °C (100 °F) as the average maximum normally occurring in March. The lowest recorded was 18 °C (64 °F) in the Kulaman area from December to early January.

=== Administrative divisions ===
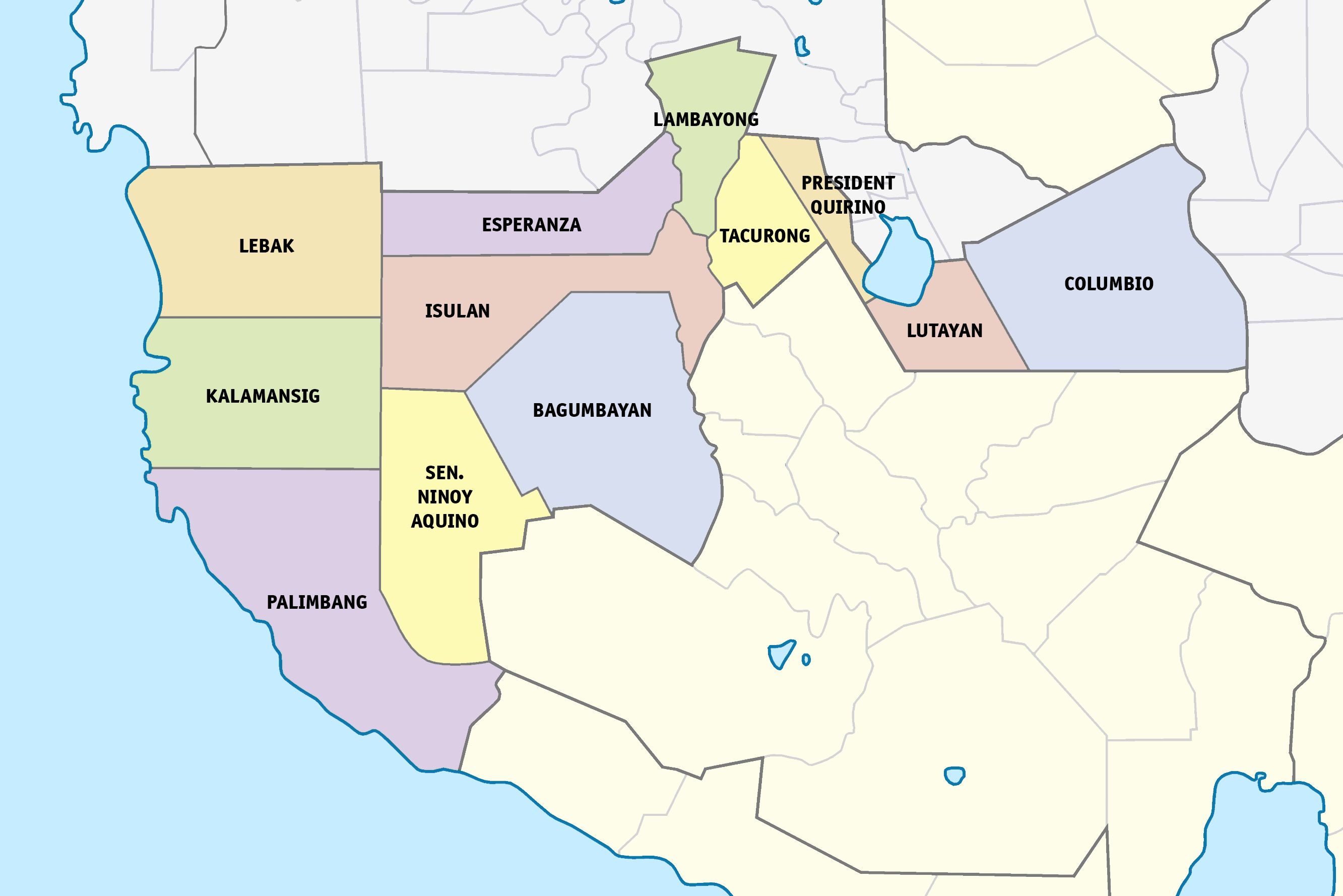
Political map of Sultan Kudarat

Sultan Kudarat comprises 11 municipalities and 1 city. Three of the municipalities (Kalamansig, Lebak, and Palimbang) are coastal towns, while the rest of the province is located inland. The 11 municipalities and Tacurong City are further subdivided into 249 barangays.

Tacurong is the smallest unit in the province by land area, but is the most urbanized and is considered the province's commercial center. Other growth centers are Lebak and Isulan, the latter being the provincial capital.

- † Capital municipality
- ∗ Component city
- Municipality

City or municipality^{[A]}		District	Population			±% p.a.	Area		Density		Barangay	Coordinates^{[B]}
			(2020)		(2015)		km^{2}	sq mi	/km^{2}	/sq mi		
Bagumbayan		2nd	8.1%	68,947	67,061	+0.53%	672.06	259.48	100	260	19	6°32′25″N 124°34′01″E
Columbio		1st	3.9%	33,527	33,258	+0.15%	926.15	357.59	36	93	16	6°37′54″N 124°58′27″E
Esperanza		2nd	8.7%	74,696	66,095	+2.36%	324.29	125.21	230	600	19	6°43′21″N 124°31′14″E
Isulan	†	1st	11.4%	97,490	90,682	+1.39%	541.25	208.98	180	470	17	6°38′02″N 124°35′50″E
Kalamansig		2nd	6.0%	50,900	49,059	+0.70%	699.20	269.96	73	190	15	6°33′18″N 124°02′59″E
Lambayong (Mariano Marcos)		1st	9.3%	79,739	77,013	+0.66%	226.88	87.60	350	910	26	6°47′54″N 124°37′57″E
Lebak		2nd	10.7%	91,344	88,868	+0.52%	470.86	181.80	190	490	27	6°37′57″N 124°03′58″E
Lutayan		1st	7.7%	65,644	63,029	+0.78%	271.00	104.63	240	620	11	6°33′34″N 124°51′31″E
Palimbang		2nd	10.9%	92,828	90,424	+0.50%	484.85	187.20	190	490	40	6°12′39″N 124°11′21″E
President Quirino		1st	4.9%	42,244	41,408	+0.38%	208.40	80.46	200	520	19	6°41′54″N 124°44′25″E
Senator Ninoy Aquino		2nd	5.5%	47,374	46,882	+0.20%	320.00	123.55	150	390	20	6°27′34″N 124°19′20″E
Tacurong	∗	1st	12.8%	109,319	98,316	+2.04%	153.40	59.23	710	1,800	20	6°41′18″N 124°40′43″E
Total				854,052	812,095	+0.96%	5,298.34	2,045.70	160	410	249	(see GeoGroup box)
1. Former names are italicized.; 2. Coordinates mark the city/town center, and are sortable by latitude.

== Demographics ==
Population census of Sultan Kudarat
Year	Pop.	±% p.a.
1918	37,439	—
1939	53,965	+1.76%
1948	4,784	−23.60%
1960	77,783	+26.16%
1970	191,315	+9.41%
1975	238,812	+4.55%
1980	303,784	+4.93%
1990	435,905	+3.68%
1995	522,187	+3.44%
2000	586,505	+2.52%
2007	677,062	+2.00%
2010	747,087	+3.65%
2015	812,095	+1.60%
2020	854,052	+1.07%
2024	863,651	+0.27%
Source: Philippine Statistics Authority

The population of Sultan Kudarat in the 2024 census was 863,651 people, with a density of 160 inhabitants per square kilometre or 410 inhabitants per square mile.

At the 2000 census, the province had a total population of 586,505 inhabitants, which grew to 747,087 in the 2010 census. About 113 ethnic groups were identified in the province in the 2000 Census. Though an ethnically diverse province, the Hiligaynons constitute the majority of Sultan Kudarat's population, with Hiligaynon being the province's most widely spoken language. Other languages spoken in the province are Maguindanaon, Karay-a, Dulangan Manobo, Blaan, Teduray, Ilocano, and Cebuano. Filipino and English are also widely understood and used in education, business, and administration as the national official languages, the former serving as dominant language in local media and of everyday communication of speakers of different languages, making it a secondary lingua franca in the province.

Aside from the Hiligaynons, who settled in Sultan Kudarat around the 17th to 18th centuries along with the Karay-as, whereas their fellow new settlers from Visayas continued until the Philippine independence, other ethnic groups in the province include the Maguindanaons (who constitute the majority of the provincial Muslim population), as well as the Manobos, Tedurays and Blaans, the three autochthonous ethnic groups of the province. Ilocanos and Cebuanos meanwhile are relative newcomers to the province, with the former comprising the majority of the population in the towns of Lambayong and President Quirino, and the latter in the town of Kalamansig.

=== Religion ===
Religion in Sultan Kudarat (2020)
Religion	percentage
Catholic	47.9%
Islam	29.5%
Iglesia ni Cristo	2.1%
Seventh-day Adventist	1.49%
Others	19.82%

The two major religious groups in Sultan Kudarat are Catholic (47.9%) and Islam (29.5%). Other Christian groups constitute most of the remainders such as the Iglesia ni Cristo, Seventh-day Adventist, Evangelical Christians, United Church of Christ in the Philippines, Jehovah's Witnesses, United Methodist Church, Southern Baptists, as well as "tribal religions". In 2015 the Philippine Statistics Authority recorded Islam followed by 29.48% of the population.

== Economy ==
Poverty incidence of Sultan Kudarat (%)

Source: Philippine Statistics Authority

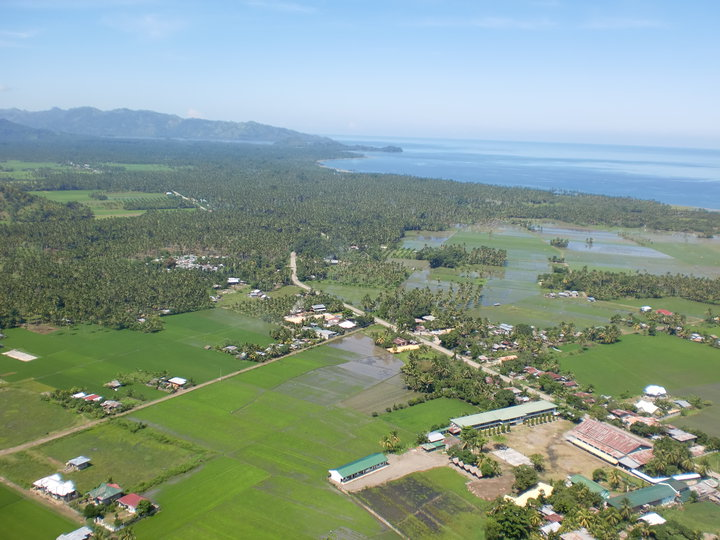
Aerial view of the western coast of the province

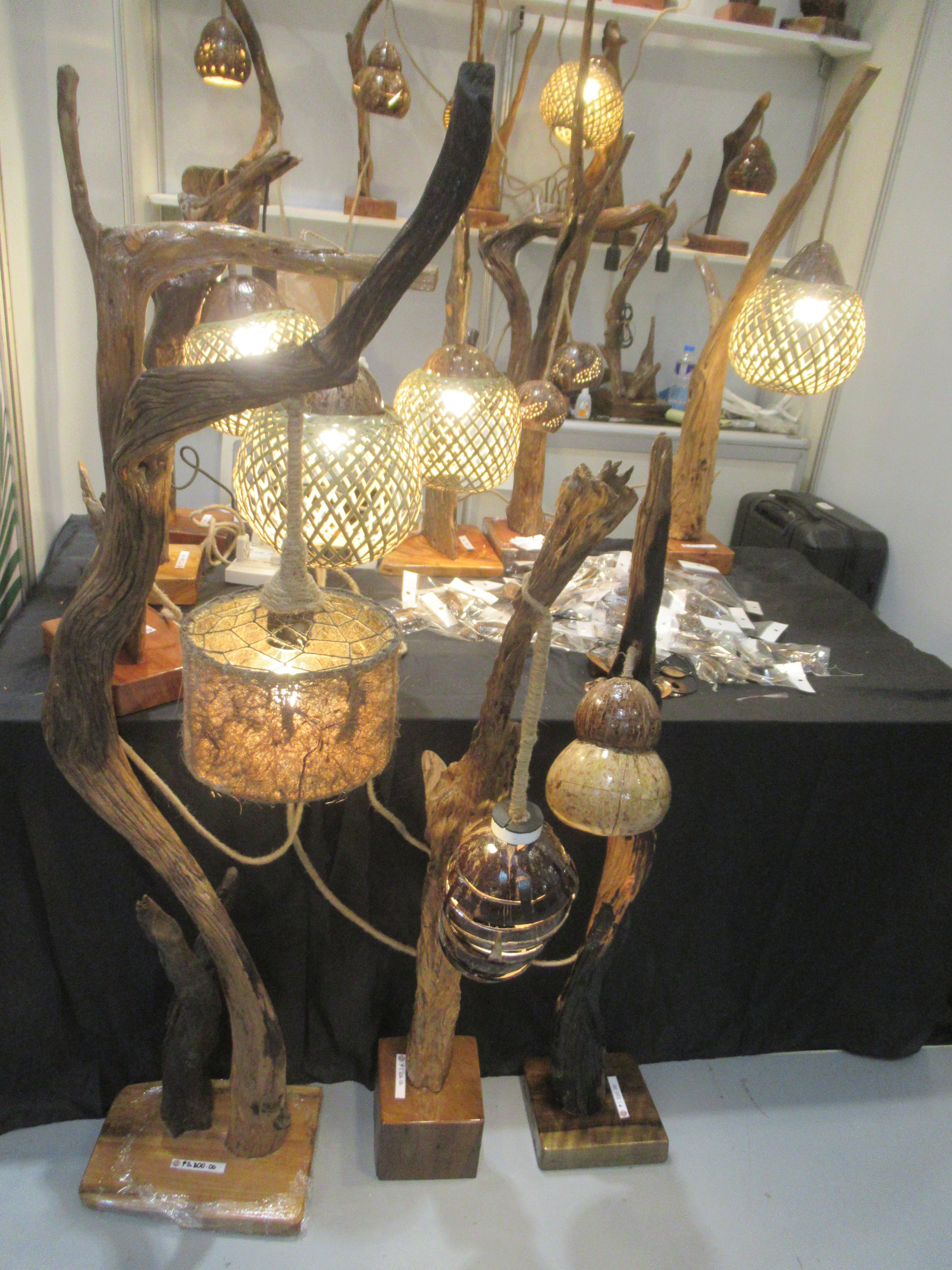
Bamboo-coconut crafts

The economy of Sultan Kudarat is predominantly agricultural. The leading crops produced in the province are rice, corn, coconuts, coffee, bananas, mangoes, durians and African palm. The province is self-sufficient in poultry, swine and root crops, and is one of the few producers of Irish potatoes in the Philippines. The southern Philippines Grain Complex in Tacurong is the largest grains-processing complex in the country. There are more than 200 rice mills in the province.

Fishing is an industry in the three coastal towns of the province (Kalamansig, Lebak and Palimbang). Tuna caught along the coasts along the Celebes Sea are exported to Japan and Europe.

Other economic activities include cottage industries, which include crafts made of rattan, coconut shells, coir, driftwood and other types of wood.

Metallic minerals, which include copper, gold and silver, are found within the mountainous areas of Isulan, Bagumbayan, Sen. Ninoy Aquino, Palimbang and Columbio. Non-metallic minerals which include sand, gravel and marbleized limestone are also found in the province.

== Education ==
For the school year 2009–2010, the province has 475 schools (401 public and 74 private), 368 of which were elementary schools, 90 were secondary, and 17 were tertiary. Sultan Kudarat State University is the only public tertiary school within the province, with its main campus at Tacurong City. Its other campuses are situated in Bagumbayan, Isulan, Kalamansig, Lutayan, Palimbang, and Senator Ninoy Aquino.

== Health facilities ==
Sultan Kudarat Provincial Hospital

In 2010, Sultan Kudarat had 27 hospitals (5 government-owned, 22 private and 1 mobile hospital), which are classified into 17 primary (6-25 beds capacity), 8 secondary (25-100 beds capacity) and 2 tertiary (over 100 beds capacity). Tacurong had the most number of hospitals in the province with 11, followed by Isulan with 5.

== Transportation ==
As of 2010, the provincial road network spanned a total length of 3,749.5813 kilometres (2,329.8818 mi) of which 49.26% were barangay roads, 27.97% provincial roads, 13.51% municipal/city roads and 9.25% national roads. Bagumbayan had the longest road network at 516.789 kilometres (321.118 mi), while Lutayan had the shortest at 107.38 kilometres (66.72 mi).

Sultan Kudarat has two seaports: the Port of Lebak in Kalamansig and the San Roque Port in Palimbang, and four airports (2 government-owned: Lebak Municipal Airport and President Quirino Airport, and 2 privately owned: Kalamansig Airport and Kenram Airport).

== Government ==
Sultan Kudarat Provincial Capitol

Seal of the province, in use since its creation in 1973. Its use was discontinued by the provincial government but recognized as legal seal of the province by NHCP.

=== Elected Officials ===
The following are the elected government officials and their years of tenure:

Elected Officials (2016-2019):

- Governor: Pax S. Mangudadatu
- Vice Governor: Raden C. Sakaluran
  - 1st District w/ Tacurong City: Suharto T. Mangudadatu
  - 2nd District: Horacio Suansing

Elected Officials (2010-2013):

- Governor: Suharto T. Mangudadatu
- Vice Governor: Ernesto F. Matias
  - 1st District w/ Tacurong City: Rep. Raden C. Sakaluran
  - 2nd District: Rep. Arnulfo F. Go

Elected Officials (2007-2010):

- Governor: Suharto T. Mangudadatu
- Vice Governor: Donato A. Ligo
  - 1st District w/ Tacurong City: Rep. Pax S. Mangudadatu
  - 2nd District: Rep. Arnulfo F. Go

Elected Officials (2004-2007):

- Representative: Suharto T. Mangudadatu
- Governor: Pax S. Mangudadatu
- Vice Governor: Donato A. Ligo

Elected Officials (1998-2000; 2000–2004):

- Representative: Angelo O. Montilla
- Governor: Pax S. Mangudadatu
- Vice Governor: Miguel Domingo T. Jacalan III

Elected Officials (1995-1998):

- Representative: Angelo O. Montilla
- Governor: Nesthur R. Gumana
- Vice Governor: Rose P. Jamison

Elected Officials (1992-1995):

- Representative: Estanislao Váldez
- Governor: Nesthur R. Gumana
- Vice Governor: Sinsuat A. Andang Sr.

=== List of former governors ===
The former governors who have administered the province are:

- Carlos B. Cajelo (Acting Governor) (November 23, 1973 — February 28, 1974)
- Gonzalo H. Siongco (Acting Governor) (March 1, 1974 — October 20, 1975)
- Conrado E. Buencamino (assumed as Governor) (October 21, 1975 — November 21, 1975)
- Benjamin C. Duque (Acting Governor) (November 22, 1975 — December 31, 1979); was elected Governor (January 1, 1980 — June 30, 1984)
- Aurelio C. Freires Jr. (July 1, 1984 — March 19, 1986)
- Perfecto C. Bautista (assumed as Officer-In-Charge of the province) (March 20, 1986 — November 30, 1987)
- Fidel A. Fortez (designated as Officer-In-Charge) (December 1, 1987 — December 22, 1987)
- Exequiel S. Mayordomo (appointed as Officer-In-Charge) (December 23, 1987 — July 12, 1988)
- Nesthur R. Gumana (elected Provincial Governor) (July 13, 1988 — March 25, 1998)
- Rosila P. Jamison (March 26 – June 30, 1998)
- Pax S. Mangudadatu (July 1, 1998 — June 30, 2007)
- Suharto T. Mangudadatu (July 1, 2007 — June 30, 2016)
- Pax S. Mangudadatu (July 1, 2016 — June 30, 2019)
- Suharto T. Mangudadatu (July 1, 2019 — June 30, 2022)

== Festivals ==
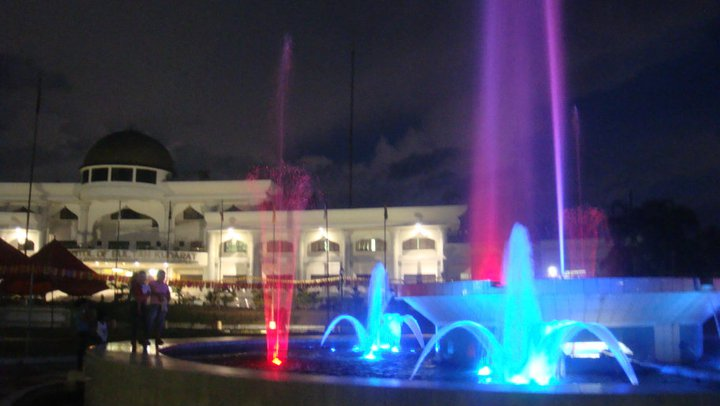
Sultan Kudarat Provincial Capitol in Isulan at night

Festivals celebrated within the province include:

- Kalimudan — celebrated in the province of Sultan Kudarat, a gathering of ethnic groups within the province
- Bansadayaw — celebrated in Bagumbayan
- Kastifun — celebrated in Columbio
- Hinabyog — celebrated in Esperanza
- Hamungaya — celebrated in Isulan
- Salagaan — celebrated in Kalamansig
- Timpuyog — celebrated in Lambayong
- Kapeonan — celebrated in Lebak
- Kanduli — celebrated in Lutayan
- Kalilang — celebrated in Palimbang
- Sambuyawan — celebrated in President Quirino
- Sulok — celebrated in Senator Ninoy Aquino
- Talakudong — celebrated in Tacurong City
