= YBL =

YBL or Ybl may refer to:

- Campbell River Airport (IATA: YBL), British Columbia, Canada
- Miklós Ybl, Hungarian architect
- Yellow Book of Lecan, a medieval Irish manuscript
- Yellow Bus Line, in Mindanao, Philippines
- Yukuben language (ISO 639:ybl), spoken in Nigeria
- 166886 Ybl, a minor planet

== See also ==
- YLB (disambiguation)
