= Isulan =

Capital of Sultan Kudarat, Philippines

- Municipality
- Municipality of Isulan
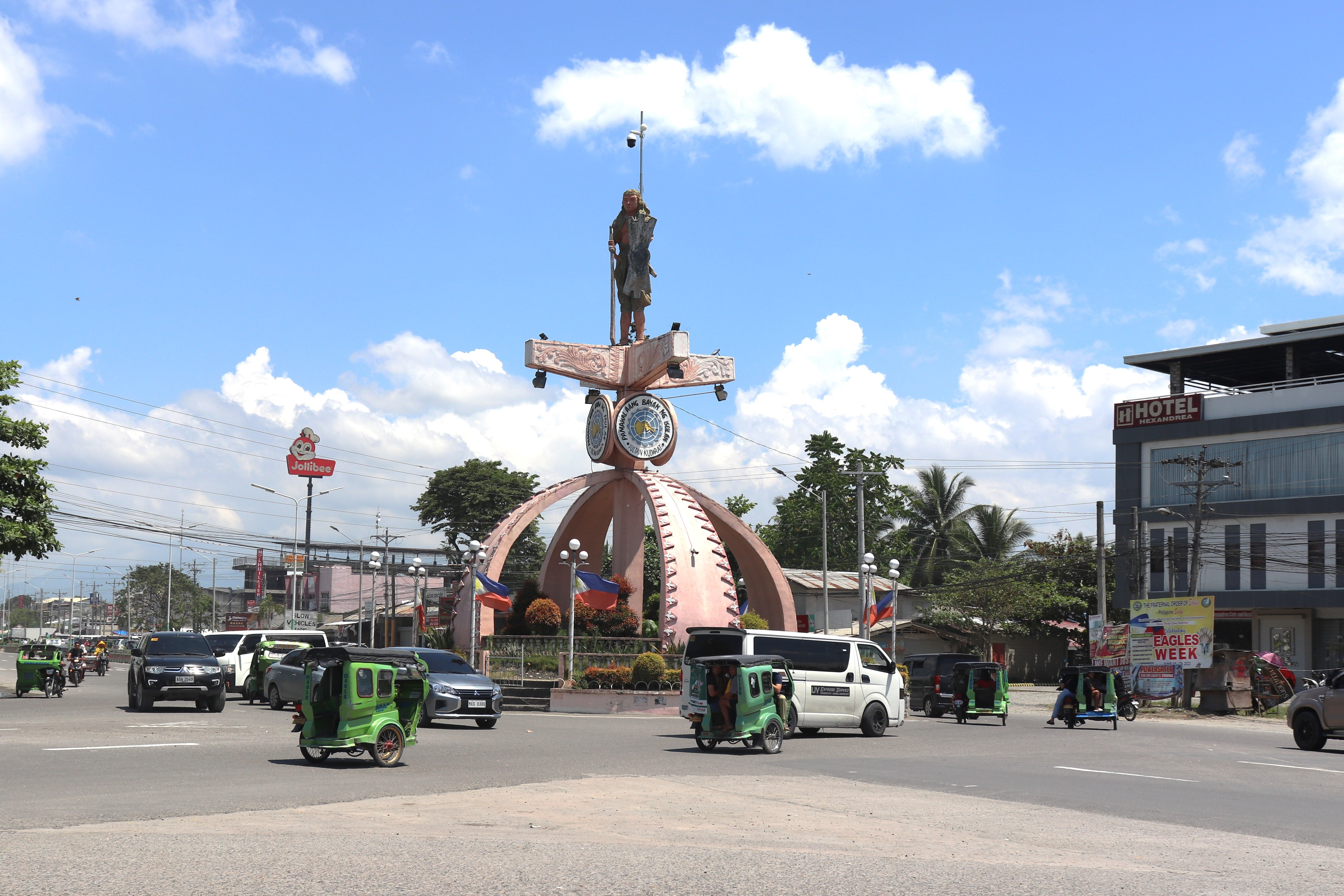
- Isulan Roundabout

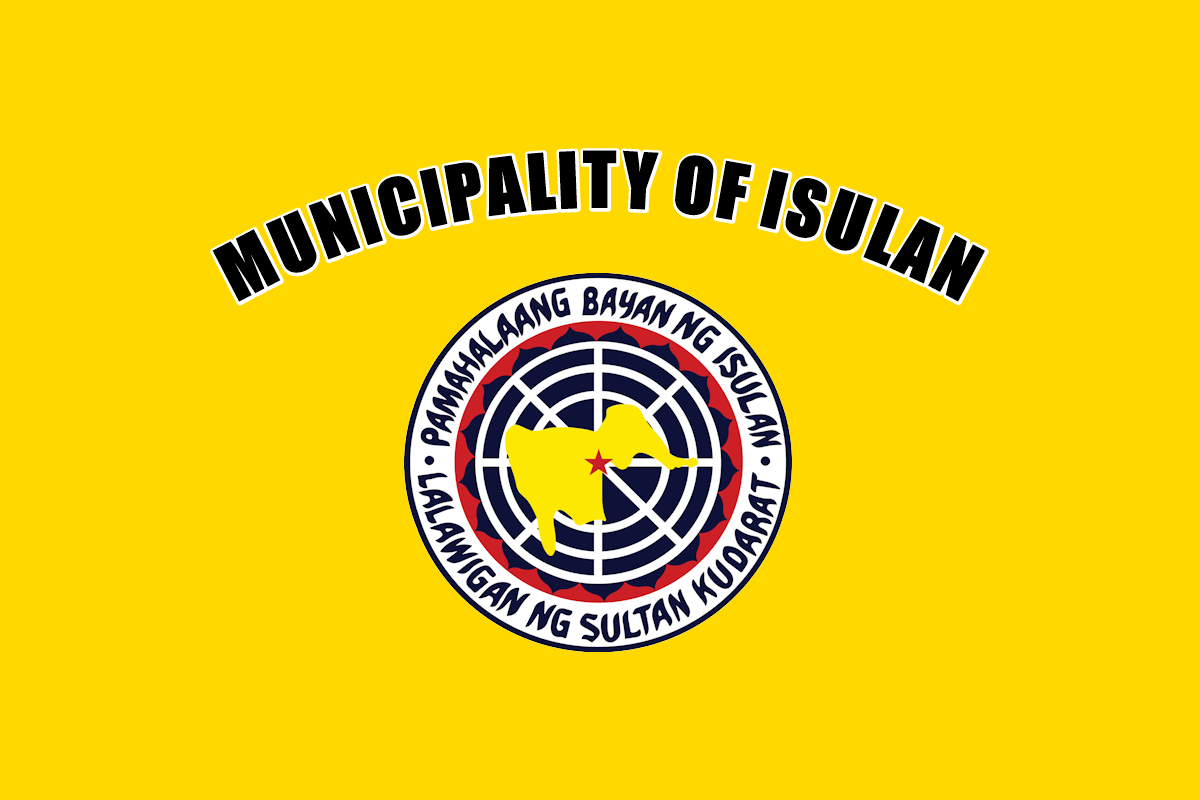
- Flag Seal
- Nickname: Oil Palm Capital of the Philippines
- Motto(s): Sulong Bagong Isulan, Aarangkada!
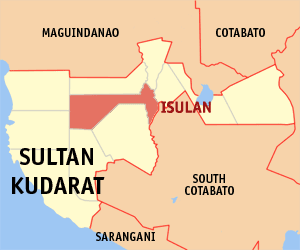
- Map of Sultan Kudarat with Isulan highlighted
- Interactive map of Isulan
- Location within the Philippines
- Coordinates: 6°38′N 124°36′E
- Country: Philippines
- Region: Soccsksargen
- Province: Sultan Kudarat
- District: 1st district
- Founded: August 30, 1957
- Barangays: 17 (see Barangays)

Government
  - Type: Sangguniang Bayan
  - Mayor: Princess Rihan M. Sakaluran
  - Vice Mayor: Atty. Arnold H. Armada
  - Representative: Ruth Mangudadatu-Sakaluran
  - Municipal Council: Members: Carlo F. Apiado; Moises B. Dolar; Alfonso S. Demasuay; Darlene H. Lama; Marvin L. Dalanon; Ana Fe M. Collado; Janice Joy P. Dollete; Jay R G. Dizon; NB
  - Electorate: 73,265 voters (2025)

Area
  - Total: 541.25 km^{2} (208.98 sq mi)
- Elevation: 65 m (213 ft)
- Highest elevation: 85 m (279 ft)
- Lowest elevation: 50 m (160 ft)

Population (2024 census)
  - Total: 101,455
  - Density: 187.45/km^{2} (485.48/sq mi)
  - Households: 22,547
- Demonym(s): Isulanen; Isulanon

Economy
  - Income class: 1st municipal income class
  - Poverty incidence: 19.59% (2023)
  - Revenue: ₱ 55.53 million (2024)
  - Assets: ₱ 1,207 million (2024)
  - Expenditure: ₱ 450.9 million (2024)
  - Liabilities: ₱ 510 million (2024)

Service provider
  - Electricity: Sultan Kudarat Electric Cooperative (SUKELCO)
- Time zone: UTC+8 (PST)
- ZIP code: 9805
- PSGC: 1206504000
- IDD : area code: +63 (0)64
- Native languages: Maguindanao; Hiligaynon; Tagalog

Isulan, officially the Municipality of Isulan (Hiligaynon: Banwa sang Isulan; Maguindanaon: Inged nu Isulan, Jawi: ايڠد نو اسولن; Tagalog: Bayan ng Isulan), is a municipality and capital of the province of Sultan Kudarat, Philippines. According to the 2024 census, it has a population of 101,455 people.

== Etymology ==
The Christian settlers initially preferred to name their new town through a referendum. However, Datu Kudanding Camsa, a respected and influential figure, ultimately chose the name himself.

His decision was influenced by accounts of earlier conflicts in the area. In the 19th century, a sultanate based in Maganoy, led by Sultan Utto, launched an attack against a smaller community under Sultan Rajahmuda Mopak. Despite being heavily outnumbered, Mopak chose to confront the opposing force.

During the encounter, the battle cry “Isu-silan,” meaning “They are there, advance,” was shouted. The display of resolve reportedly impressed Sultan Utto, who opted to settle the conflict through negotiation rather than prolonged fighting, placing the area under his protection.

The municipality of Sultan Kudarat Mopak Isulan is said to have derived its name from “Isu-silan,” later associated with the idea of “progress.”

== History ==
The present territories of Isulan formerly belonged to the municipalities of Koronadal and Dulawan. The municipality of Koronadal was created under E.O. No. 82 dated August 8, 1947 by Pres. Manuel L. Roxas.

On March 10, 1953, the municipality of Norala was created by virtue of E.O.NO.572, whose territorial jurisdiction was taken from the municipality of Koronadal.

Datu Kudanding Camsa in the latter part of 1956 initiated the creation of another municipality to be taken from the Municipality of Norala.

On March 20, 1957, Engr. Jose M. Ancheta of the Bureau of Public Highways of Cotabato made its first endorsement to the provincial board and laid down the proposed boundaries of the new municipality.

Acting on this report, the provincial board of Cotabato thru Resolution No. 316 series of 1957, petitioned the President of the Philippines to create the proposed municipality.

Executive Order No. 266, pursuant to section 68 of the Administrative Code, issued and signed by the then President Carlos P. Garcia on August 30, 1957, creating the municipality of Isulan, whose territorial jurisdiction was taken from the municipality of Norala, South Cotabato, and Dulawan, Cotabato.

With the creation of the municipality of Isulan, Kalawag became the seat of its government. The municipal government officially functioned on September 12, 1957, with the appointment of its municipal mayor Datu Suma Ampatuan who served until 1967.

=== The Kalawag Settlement ===
In 1951, the Board of Directors of the Land Settlement and Development Cooperation (LASEDECO) started the opening of a settlement in an area formerly under the jurisdiction of the National Land Settlement Association (NLSA) as a reservation.

The LASEDECO had surveyed and parceled out home and farm lots and constructed municipal and barrio roads and installed electrical light generators. It had brought-in hundreds of farm tractors which uprooted big trees, cleared obstruction, planned, cleaned and harrowed the wide stretches of the area. What was once a marshy and wild expanse inhabited by snakes, crocodiles, wild cattle, swine, and deer had welcomed the first sprout of seedlings of corn and rice, thus blanketed the horizon in endless green.

When a group of 72 World War II Veterans, led by Venancio Magbanua, Post Commander of Norala had come and settled in the area, on September 7, 1950, a Kalawag root crop used as food coloring was found out abundantly growing.

Then, the early settlers decided to call and register the settlement as "Kalawag Settlement District of LASEDECO". The area comprising the town site covers approximately 400 hectares.

Immigrants from Visayas and Luzon had now come in shiploads. The most numerous batch was the "PACSA" group headed by Pedro Gabriel and Bienvenido Pamintuan otherwise known as the "Presidential Assistance Commission on Social Amelioration of the President Ramon Magsaysay. His group consisted of the erstwhile and rebellious surrenderees belonging to HUKBALAHAPs from Pampanga.

On June 21, 1969, President Marcos, signed R.A. No. 5960, creating the municipality of Bagumbayan which cost Isulan more than 85% of its original land area. But of the original land area of 336,000 hectares, only 49,551 hectares were left and the 48 barrios were reduced to 17.

Upon the passage of H.B. No. 5020 dividing the province of Cotabato, the Municipal Council of Isulan passed Resolution No. 17 dated May 31, 1972, requesting Congressman Salipada K. Pendatun and Gov. Carlos B. Cajelo that Isulan be made a capital town.

On November 22, 1973, P.D. No. 341 was issued dividing Cotabato provinces, namely; Sultan Kudarat, Maguindanao and North Cotabato. At the same time, Isulan, which is in the center of the new province, was made its capital.

== Geography ==
Isulan is centrally located and is accessible to all neighboring towns not only within the province of Sultan Kudarat but also in some municipalities of the province of Maguindanao del Sur, South Cotabato and Davao del Sur. It is bounded on the north by the municipality of Esperanza, north-east by the municipality of Lambayong; on the east by Tacurong; on the south by the municipalities of Bagumbayan and Senator Ninoy Aquino; and on the southeast by the municipalities of Norala and Santo Niño; and on the west by the municipalities of Lebak and Kalamansig. It has a total land area of 54,125 hectares (133,750 acres).

=== Barangays ===
Isulan is politically subdivided into 17 barangays. Each barangay consists of puroks while some have sitios.

- Bambad
- Bual
- D'Lotilla
- Dansuli (Poblacion)
- Impao
- Kalawag I (Poblacion)
- Kalawag II (Poblacion)
- Kalawag III (Poblacion)
- Kenram (Poblacion)
- Kolambog
- Kudanding
- Lagandang
- Laguilayan
- Mapantig
- New Pangasinan
- Sampao
- Tayugo

=== Media ===
Media

Notable media publications in Isulan, Sultan Kudarat include local newspapers, community publications, and online news outlets serving the municipality and the wider province of Sultan Kudarat.

Several radio stations serve Isulan and nearby municipalities, providing news, public-service announcements, music, and entertainment. These include Radyo Natin Isulan, 92.5 T Radio Isulan, Infinite Radio Isulan, and other FM and AM stations serving Northern Sultan Kudarat.

Television services available in Isulan include national networks and regional broadcasters, with signals reaching Isulan from nearby cities and provinces. Major networks and cable/satellite providers serve viewers throughout Sultan Kudarat and the wider SOCCSKSARGEN region.

Local and regional news coverage focuses on Isulan, Sultan Kudarat, and surrounding municipalities, including government activities, community events, public affairs, and provincial news.

== Demographics ==
Population census of Isulan
Year	Pop.	±% p.a.
1960	21,431	—
1970	29,850	+3.36%
1975	30,905	+0.70%
1980	39,283	+4.91%
1990	56,488	+3.70%
1995	65,202	+2.72%
2000	73,129	+2.49%
2007	79,277	+1.12%
2010	86,602	+3.27%
2015	90,682	+0.88%
2020	97,490	+1.54%
2024	101,455	+0.96%
Source: Philippine Statistics Authority

=== Languages ===
Hiligaynon is the predominantly spoken language in the municipality, with the bulk of Isulan's population predominantly consisting of descendants of settlers who came from the Hiligaynon-speaking parts of the Visayas, namely the islands of Panay and Negros Occidental. Maguindanaon is a native language spoken in Isulan, while other languages spoken in the municipality are Tagalog, Cebuano, Ilocano, Karay-a, Kapampangan, Chavacano, Pangasinan, Waray and others.

== Economy ==
Poverty incidence of Isulan (%)

Source: Philippine Statistics Authority

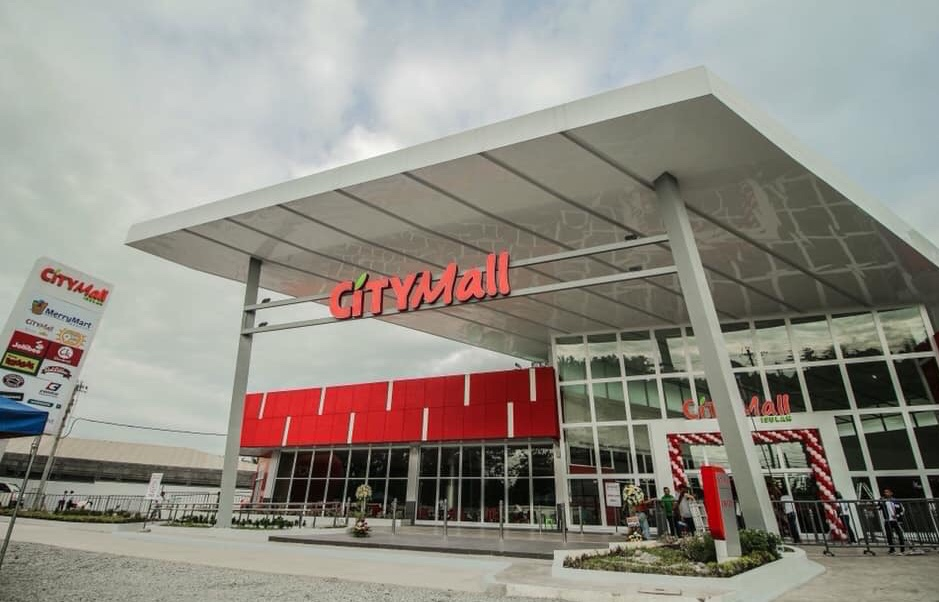
CityMall Isulan facade

Isulan has various department stores and a mall, the list below contains the current malls and the future shopping centers in Isulan.

- CityMall Isulan - owned by Double Dragon Properties and SM investment, opened on December 18, 2018.
- MGM Shopping Plaza - one of the biggest shopping centers operating in Isulan.
- Isulan Central Plaza - first department store and one of the oldest in Isulan. Opened in the late 1990s.
- Novo Shirts and Jeans - acquired the old Licon Cinema Building
- New Valencia Dry Good Store and Gen. Mdse. - offers ready-to-wear and grocery.

== Transportation ==
The municipality has an integrated terminal with buses, vans and jeepneys going to various areas of Cotabato, South Cotabato, Sarangani, and Davao Region.

Bus companies include:

- Yellow Bus Line, Inc. General Santos, Koronadal City, Surallah, South Cotabato and Esperanza, Sultan Kudarat, Cotabato City
- Husky Tours Cotabato City, Koronadal City
- Mindanao Star Cotabato City and Davao City

== Culture ==
=== Festival ===
Every month of August 30, the municipality of Isulan conducts the Hamungaya Festival to celebrate its foundation. Isulanons believe that the wealth of arts and culture is expressed in many forms and in so many kinds. The festival showcases skills and talents in literary, musical and cultural aspects of the constituents both young and old.

The Hamungaya also depicts the thanksgiving festival of its residents who are mostly engaged in agriculture. This includes rice and corn farming, vegetables and crops production including the famous African palm which has contributed a lot to the utilization of its by-products as construction materials – the uniquely woven "kalakat" known all over Mindanao.

The festival is divided into two parts: the first part shows the different activities being done in the farm. After which a thanksgiving is performed for their good harvest. The second part shows the merrymaking in the form of dance using different properties and materials that make it very festive.

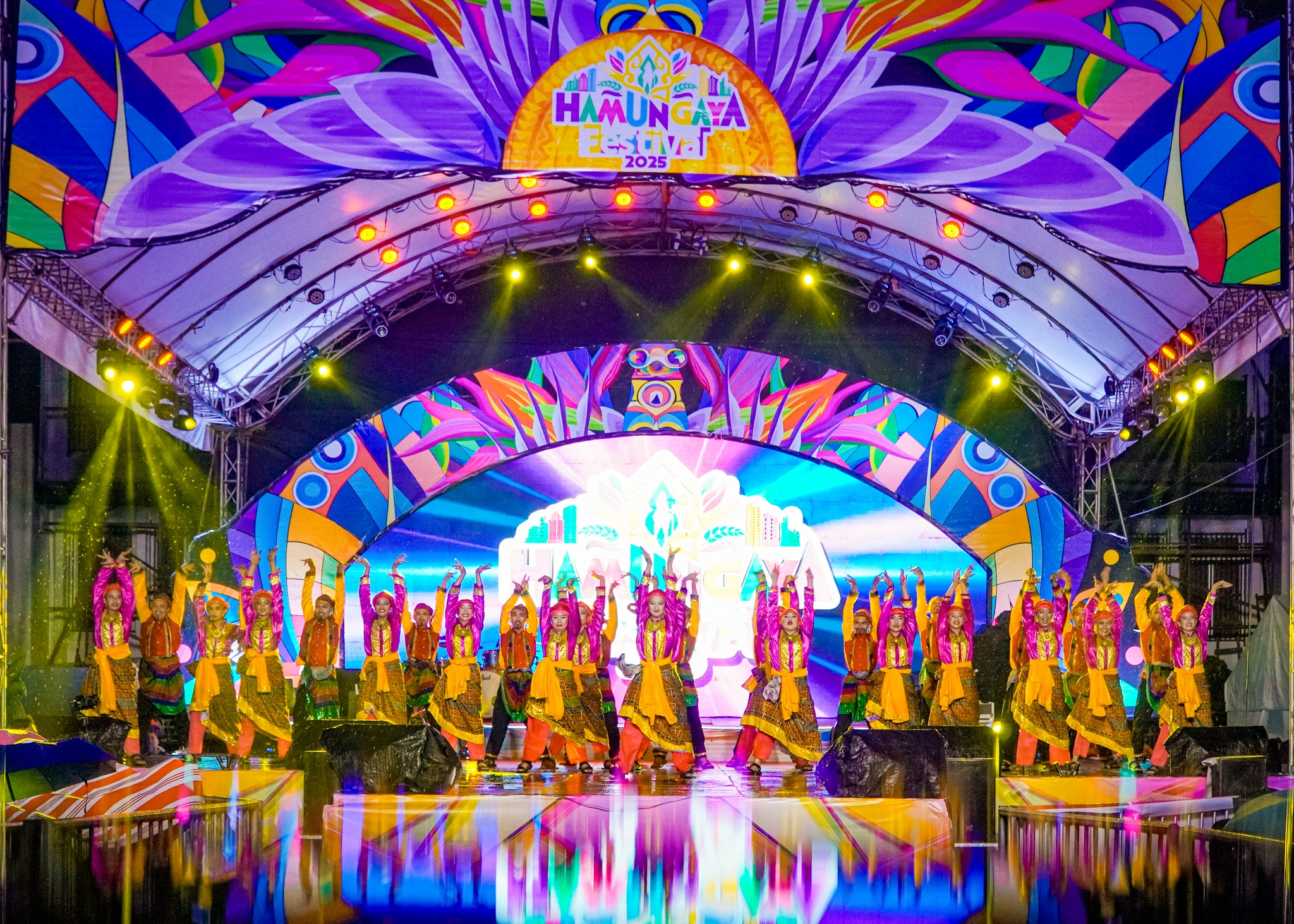
The Hamungaya Festival is a significant cultural celebration in Isulan, Sultan Kudarat, Philippines, held every August to coincide with the municipality's founding anniversary.

As a whole, the Hamungaya Festival actually expresses life itself or deep-seated emotion communicated by the emotions of the human body blending with the music. The flow of body movements, the sound of the music and the grace with which the dance is executed all build up the story or emotions being communicated.

This form of art, along with other activities and talents displayed during the festivities, is often cited as a means of promoting solidarity among the peoples of Sultan Kudarat province.

== Tourism ==
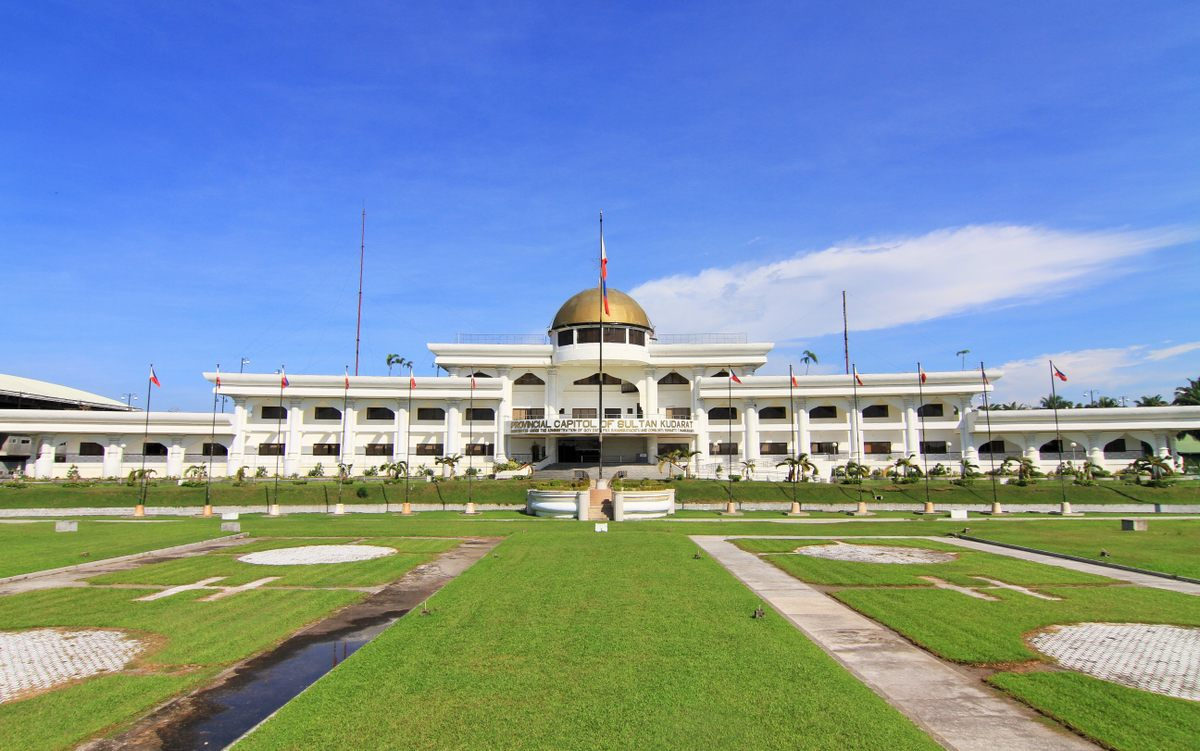
Sultan Kudarat Provincial Capitol

- Lagandang Hot Spring/Sulphur Spring
- Kamanga Cave and Falls
- Daguma Mountain range
- Landmark of the Royalty
- Narra Eco Park
- Stallion Farm
- Sultan Kudarat Provincial Capitol

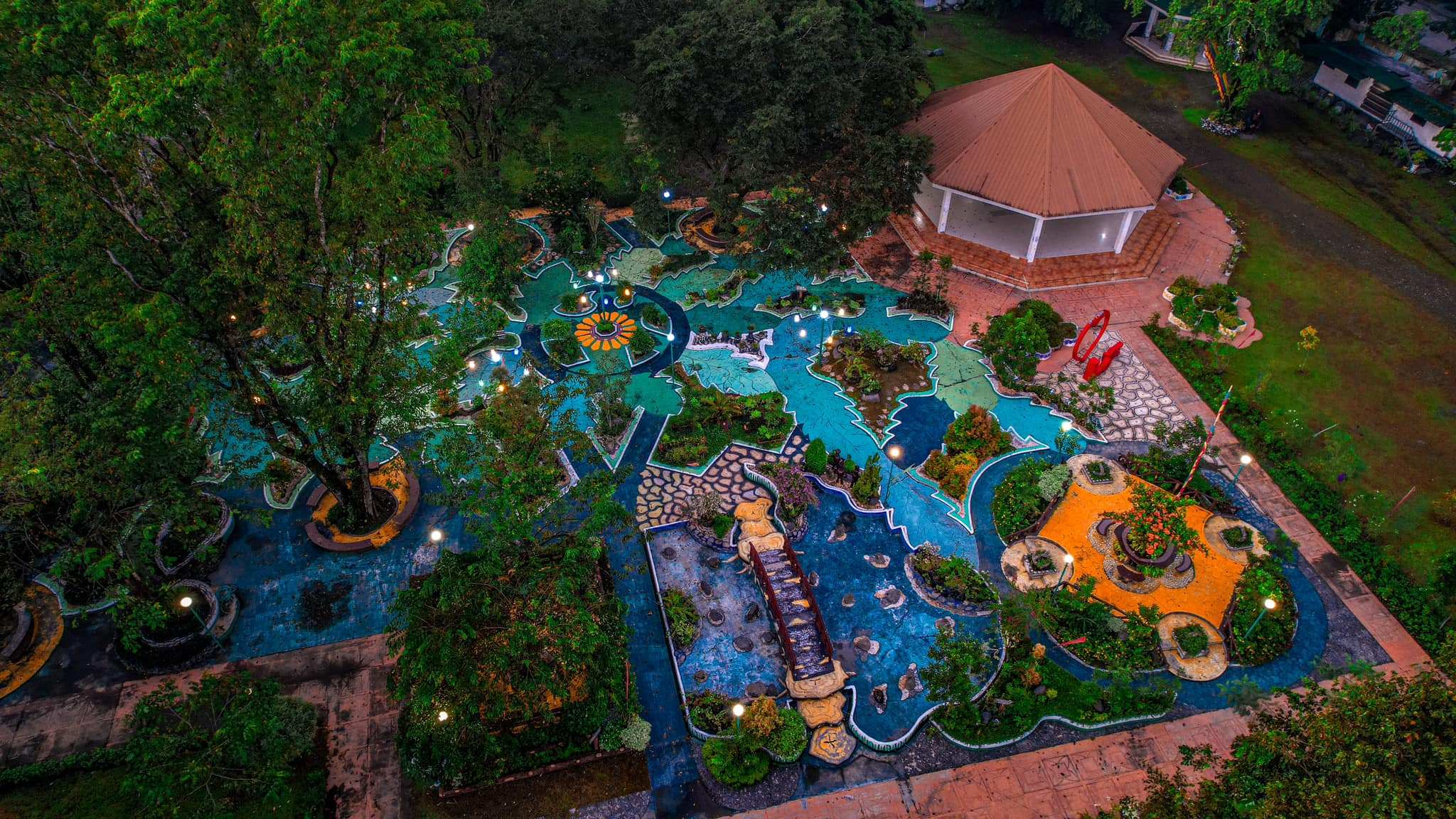
Narra Eco Park

== Healthcare ==
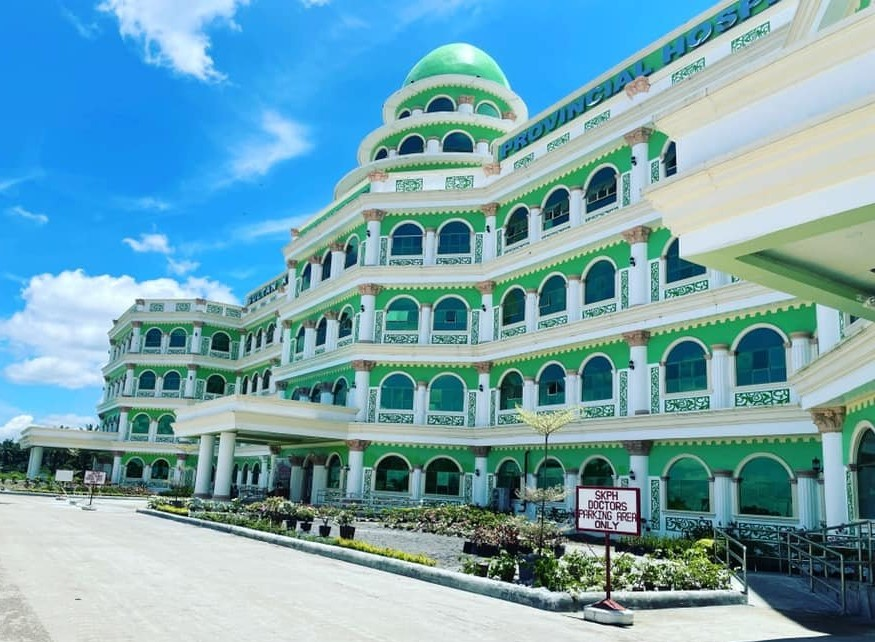
Sultan Kudarat Provincial Hospital

- Isulan Doctor's Specialist Center
- Holy Nazarene Clinic and Hospital
- Galinto Family Hospital
- Matias Hospital
- Retirado Clinic and Hospital
- St. Dominic Savio General Hospital Inc.
- Sultan Kudarat Provincial Hospital

== Education ==
Privately run academic schools

- Green Valley College Foundation, Inc. (Isulan Campus)
- Montessori Learning Center
- The Notre Dame of Isulan, Inc.
- Isulan Community School.
- Precious Ones Learning Center
- King's College of Isulan

Government-run schools

East Isulan District elementary school

- Kalawag Central Elementary School
- Kalawag III Elementary School

Central Isulan District elementary schools

- Isulan Central School SPED Center
- Don Juan P. Garcia Memorial Elementary School
- Dansuli Elementary School
- Impao Elementary School
- Datu Talipasan Memorial Elementary School
- Mapantig Elementary School

South Isulan District elementary schools

- Bambad Central School
- Kolambog Elementary School
- Kudanding Elementary School

West Isulan District elementary schools

- Laguilayan Central School
- Kamanga Elementary School
- New Egana Elementary School
- D. Lotilla Elementary School
- Tayugo Elementary School
- New Pangasinan Elementary School
- Datu Anok O. Galmak Elementary School
- Lagandang Elementary School
- Mantisao Elementary School

Public secondary schools

- Isulan National High School
- Bambad National High School
- Laguilayan National High School
- New Pangasinan High School

Government-owned tertiary institution

- Sultan Kudarat State University (Isulan Campus)
