= Husky Tours =

Bus company in the Philippines

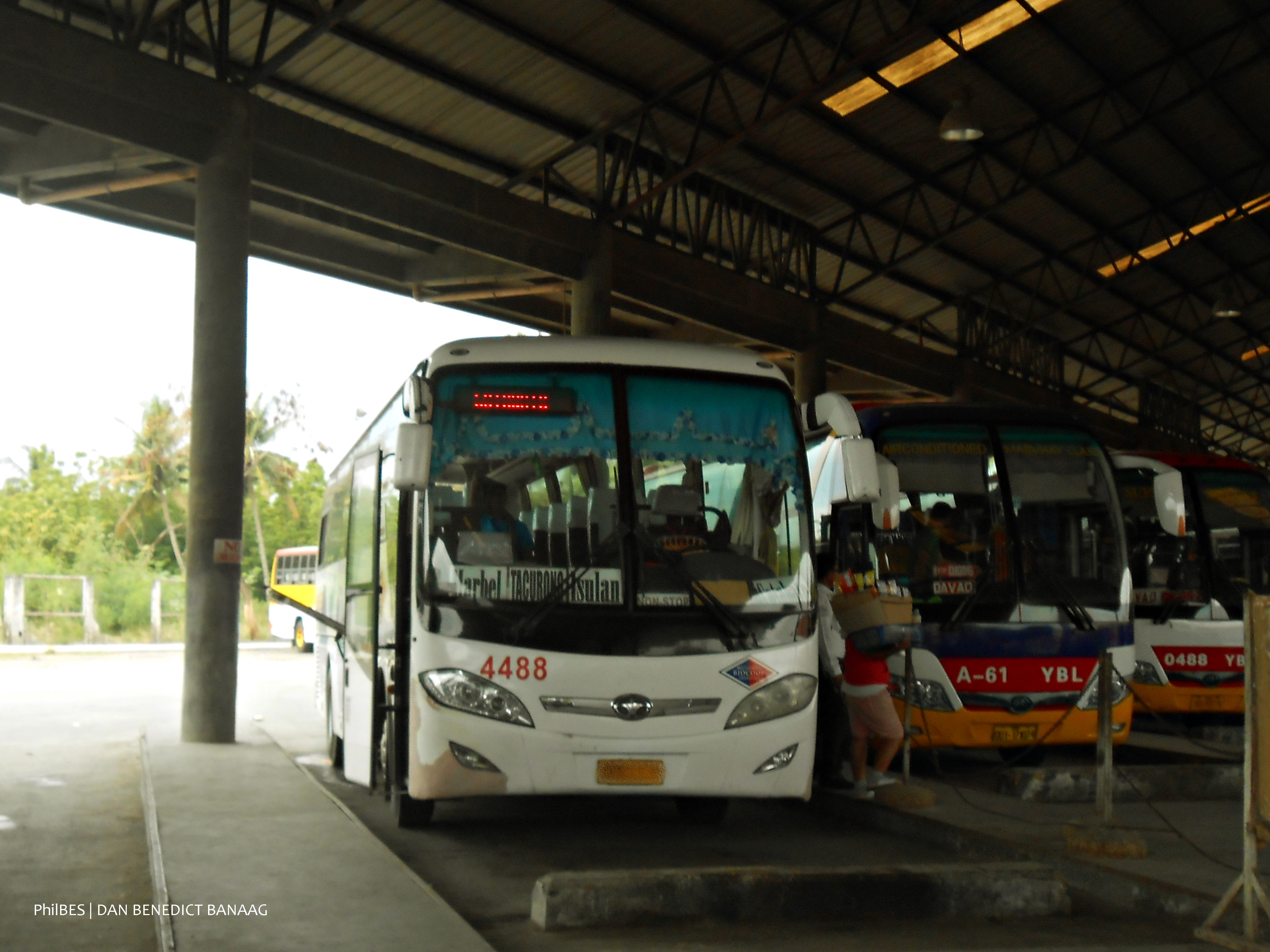
- A Husky Tours 4488 in General Santos
- Parent: Biocrest Multi-Purpose Cooperative
- Founded: 2000
- Headquarters: 09, Daproza Avenue, General Santos
- Service area: General Santos; Cotabato City
- Service type: Land transport
- Fleet: 36
- Operator: Biocrest Multi-Purpose Cooperative and Transport Services

Husky Tours is a bus company that is based in General Santos and has direct operations to the cities of General Santos, Cotabato and Cotabato City. They were often dubbed as "Husky Bus" or "Husky" by their passengers, and by several tour blogging sites. Their operations are headed by Biocrest Multi-Purpose Cooperative, a cooperative formed by the officers of Biocrest Corporation and Eleventh Corporation in General Santos

== Etymology and branding ==
The bus company name literally came from a sled-type of dog that is used in the northern regions, Husky. They use a Siberian Husky dog as their corporate branding with blue and white color scheme, while their buses are categorized by the good characteristics of a husky such as "Loyal", "Helpful" and "Trustworthy".

== History ==
It started when the officers and employees of Biocrest Corporation and Eleventh Marketing Corporation to organize a transport service company. Thus the formation of Biocrest Multi-Purpose Cooperative and Transport Services, with Biocrest Multi-Purpose Cooperative as its parent company with its function to address the credit and consumer needs of its employees and members. Their Multi-Purpose Cooperative was then granted by the Department of Labor and Employment in 2005 through the Cooperative Development Authority (CDA) of Region XII.

Although the company's name was Biocrest Multi-Purpose Cooperative and Transport Services, they choose to use the branding "Husky Tours" with a Siberian Husky as their corporate logo and branding. They debuted the route from General Santos to Cotabato City via Koronadal City, Tacurong City, Isulan and Shariff Aguak.

They started with several coaches made from Almazora Motors. A several Hino RK Cats Eye air-conditioned and ordinary fare units, and some old buses from the defunct KTM Tours which Husky once bought were begun to be used for Husky Tours' operations.

By that time, bus companies are afraid to serve the General Santos - Cotabato route due to in-surging conflicts between the government and rebel groups along the mountainous areas of SOCCSKARGEN Region. Thus, only Husky Tours serve the said route up until today.

In 2007, Husky Tours operates a lone Zonda YCK6117HG. They became the lone bus company to own a Zonda bus in the Philippines.

In 2012, Husky Tours began to dissolve their ordinary-fare buses and stick to their air-conditioned units. At that same year, Chinese bus manufacturer Sunlong was about to expand their sales to the Philippine Market. Husky Tours then ordered four(4) Sunlong SLK6106 and became the first bus company to operate a Sunlong bus in the Philippines. When their orders finally arrive in the Manila from China and in delivery to their headquarters in General Santos, Sunlong uses those Husky Tours buses as their marketing campaign with Sunlong's promotional ads in place at their bus units.

In 2015, they ordered 12 bus units from Guilin Daewoo. By the following year, another 8 bus units were ordered from Zhongtong and at the same time they acquired 2 Guilin Daewoo GDW6119H2 from Weena Express. The new orders pushes them to replace their old units with these new ones.

In 2022, Husky Tours bought six second hand Higer buses from Froelich Tours making them the 2nd bus company in the island of Mindanao to operate a Double Decker bus after Pabama Tours.

== Fleet ==
Model	In service
Guilin Daewoo GDW6119H2	13
Zhongtong LCK6107H	7
Zhongtong LCK6128H	10
Higer KLQ6122D	2
Higer KLQ6125	1
Higer KLQ6119HTQ	2
Higer KLQ6119Q	1

== See also ==
- Davao Metro Shuttle
- Mindanao Star
- Yellow Bus Line
- List of bus companies of the Philippines
