= Mindanao Star =

Bus company in the Philippines

Mindanao Star Bus Transport Inc.
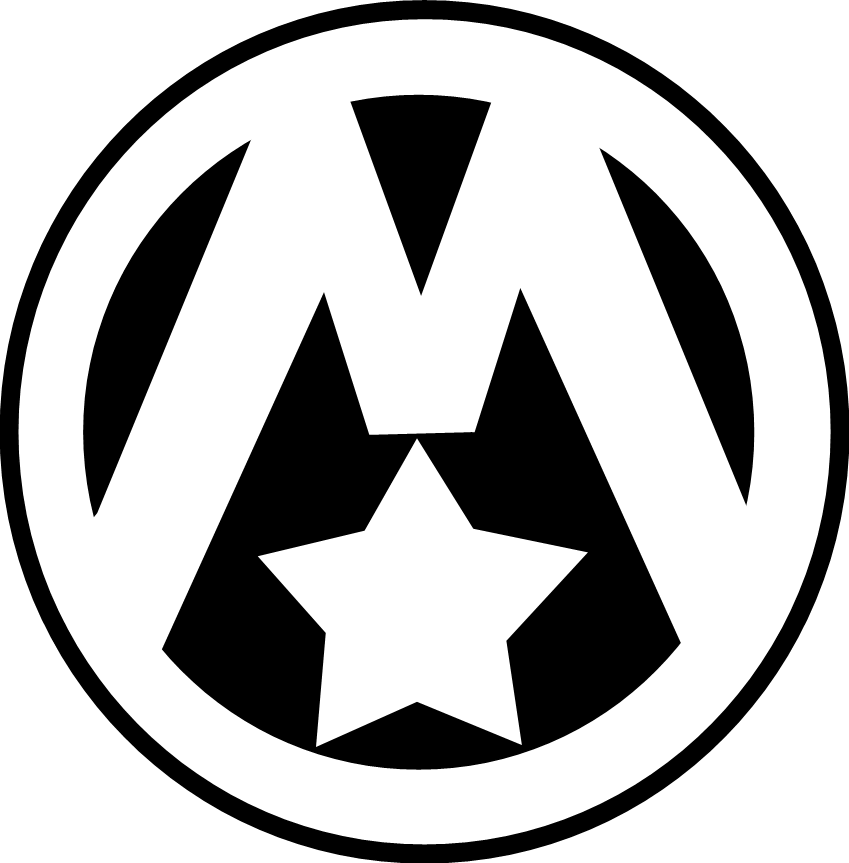

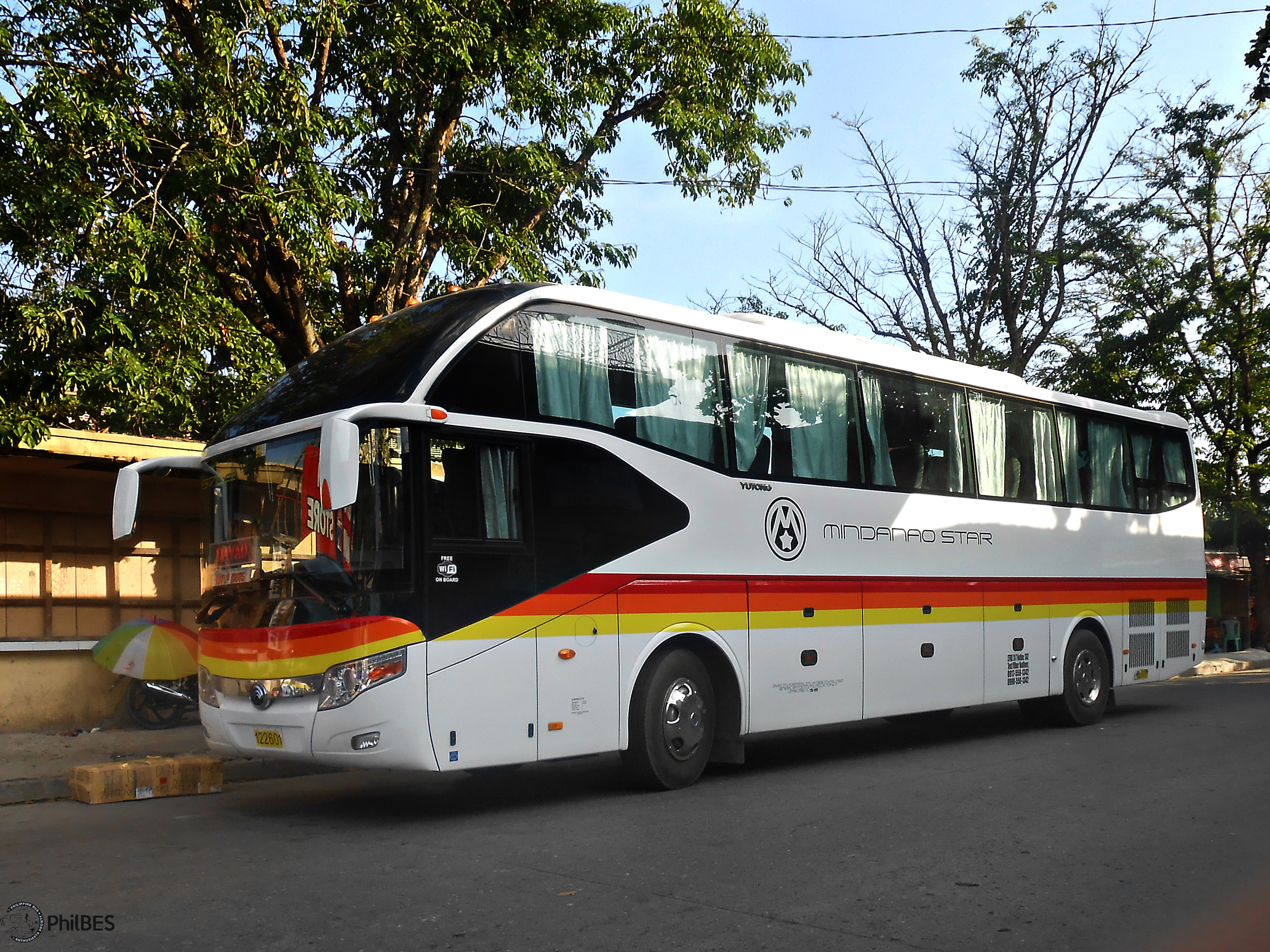
- Mindanao Star Yutong unit rest at Davao Terminal, that plies for Davao-General Santos route.
- Parent: Yanson Group of Bus Companies
- Founded: 1980; 46 years ago (as Weena Express); 2015; 11 years ago (as Mindanao Star)
- Headquarters: Bugac, Maa Road, Davao City, Davao del Sur
- Service area: Mindanao
- Service type: Provincial Operation
- Destinations: Davao City; Digos City; Kidapawan City; Cotabato City; General Santos; Islamic City of Marawi; Zamboanga City
- Hubs: Davao City; Cotabato
- Fleet: 100 Bus units (Hino Motors, Golden Dragon, Nissan Diesel, Daewoo Bus, Hino Motors, Kinglong and Yutong)
- Operator: Mindanao Star Bus Transport, Incorporated
- Chief executive: Leo Rey V. Yanson (President and Chairman)
- Website: Official website

Mindanao Star Bus Transport, Incorporated (formerly Weena Express, People's Transport Corporation) is a bus line under the umbrella of Yanson Group of Bus Companies (YGBC). It operates bus transport services from Davao City, to Soccsksargen Region, base in Ma-a, Davao City. Mindanao Star was once a part of Bachelor Express, but was later formed as an independent subsidiary of Yanson Group.

== History ==
It was established in 1980 as a Weena Express by its owner Mr. Bernardo "Digoy" M. Valdevieso. It pioneered bus services between Davao City and Cotabato City. It also has a sister company, named People's Transport Corporation, plying the same route.

In 2001, the whose franchise was suspended due to an accident that left 32 dead. Between 2002 and 2008, the bus line suffered bombings due to extortion attempts, which led to the company having financial problems. As early as 2007, Valdevieso already expressed his intent of selling the company to potential buyers saying that the attacks against his buses and terminals have proven to be burdensome to his financial standing.

After eight years of Valdevieso's struggle, on January 7, 2015, the company announced that it has been sold to Bachelor Express Incorporated. The company officially rebranded as Mindanao Star in mid-2015, with its first refurbished unit, number 15062, operated in June that year.

However, in the midst of its operation, Mindanao Star was separated from Bachelor Express and established its own subsidiary with the same name as its corporate branding, thus the Mindanao Star Bus Transport Incorporated. Their base once shared inside Bachelor Express' garage in Davao was recently moved to the former Weena Express' garage located near Bachelor's. They moved along with their new office and maintenance facilities.

In October 2015, Mindanao Star bought Holiday Bus, the bus line of Davao Holiday Transport Services Inc., plying the Davao City – General Santos route, with a competitor to Yellow Bus Line, Inc.

In April 2018, Mindanao Star bought Holiday Bus' sister company, Island City Express, plying the Davao City – Island Garden City of Samal route. The Island City Express name was retained as part of the purchase contract.

In August 2019, Mindanao Star was operate between Toril, Catalunan Grande and Cabantian routes as part of Davao City's Peak-Hours Augmentation Bus Service program.

== Bases ==
Their subsidiaries are sub-divided by bases. These are based on their area of their operation, and their base number shall be the prefix number for their bus fleets. Yanson Group started this practice in 2005 after they bought out Lilian Express Inc., and felt that re-organizing their company is needed.

There are two bases with one common base number under Mindanao Star:

| Prefix | Base | Address |
|---|---|---|
| 15 | Cotabato | Don Rufino Alonzo Avenue, Cotabato City |
| 15 | Davao | Bugac, Ma-a, Davao City |

Cotabato and Davao bases were once a facility of the former Weena Express. With the sold out, Yanson Group uses the garage as Base 15's field offices.

== Provincial destinations ==
=== Cotabato base ===
Cotabato base is located at Don Rufino Alonzo Avenue, Cotabato City, with its terminal hub at the same location. The base is assigned as Base 15 of Yanson Group of Bus Companies, a base that is commonly shared with their head office in Davao City. Their routes are from Cotabato City to Davao City.

- Cotabato City - Pigcawayan
- Cotabato City - Libungan
- Cotabato City - Midsayap
- Cotabato City - Pikit
- Cotabato City - Kabacan
- Cotabato City - Matalam
- Cotabato City - Kidapawan City
- Cotabato City - Makilala
- Cotabato City - Bansalan
- Cotabato City - Digos City
- Cotabato City - Santa Cruz
- Cotabato City - Davao City

=== Davao base ===
Davao base is located at Bugac, Ma-a, Davao City, with its terminal hub at Davao City Overland Transport Terminal (Ecoland), Candelaria, Talomo, Davao City. The base is assigned as Base 15 of Yanson Group of Bus Companies, a base that is commonly shared with Cotabato City. Their routes are from Davao to Soccsksargen Region, while they also cater several routes from General Santos to its neighboring town and cities. The operation at General Santos was the result of their acquisition to Davao Holiday Bus Corporation.

- Davao City - Kidapawan City
- Davao City - Koronadal City via General Santos
- Davao City - Zamboanga City via Cotabato City, Parang, Malabang, Pagadian City, Ipil

== Former destinations ==
- Davao City - Marawi City via Cagayan de Oro City, Iligan City
- Davao City - Kaputian, Island Garden City of Samal via Babak, Peñaplata

== Gallery ==
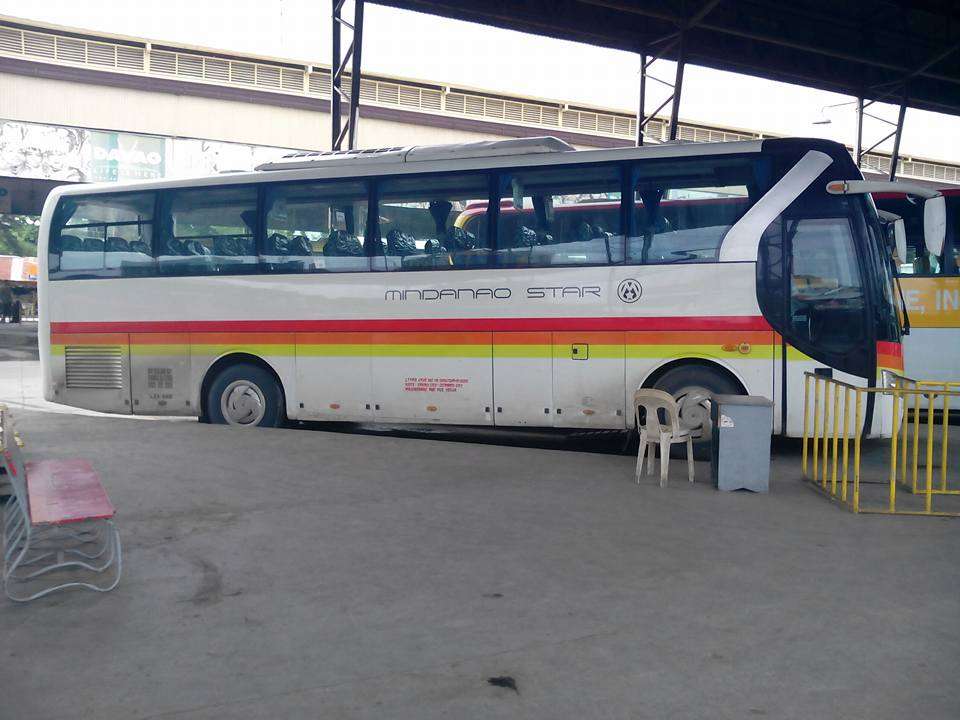
Mindanao Star's Golden Dragon unit plying the Davao-Cotabato route, in Davao City terminal.

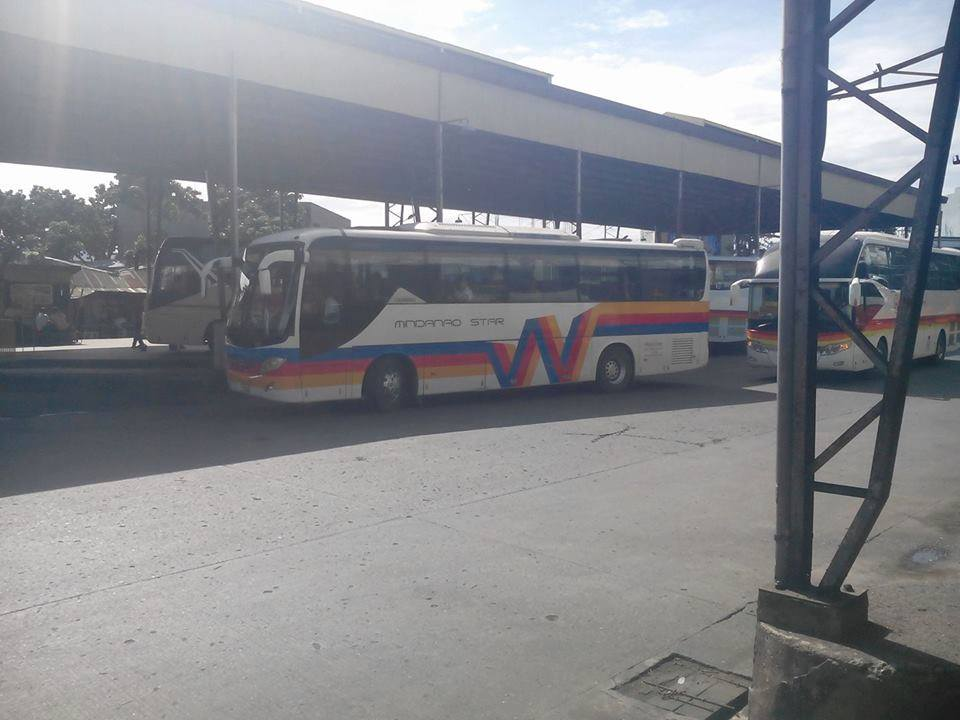
Mindanao Star's Guilin Daewoo CDW6119H in its former Weena Express livery.

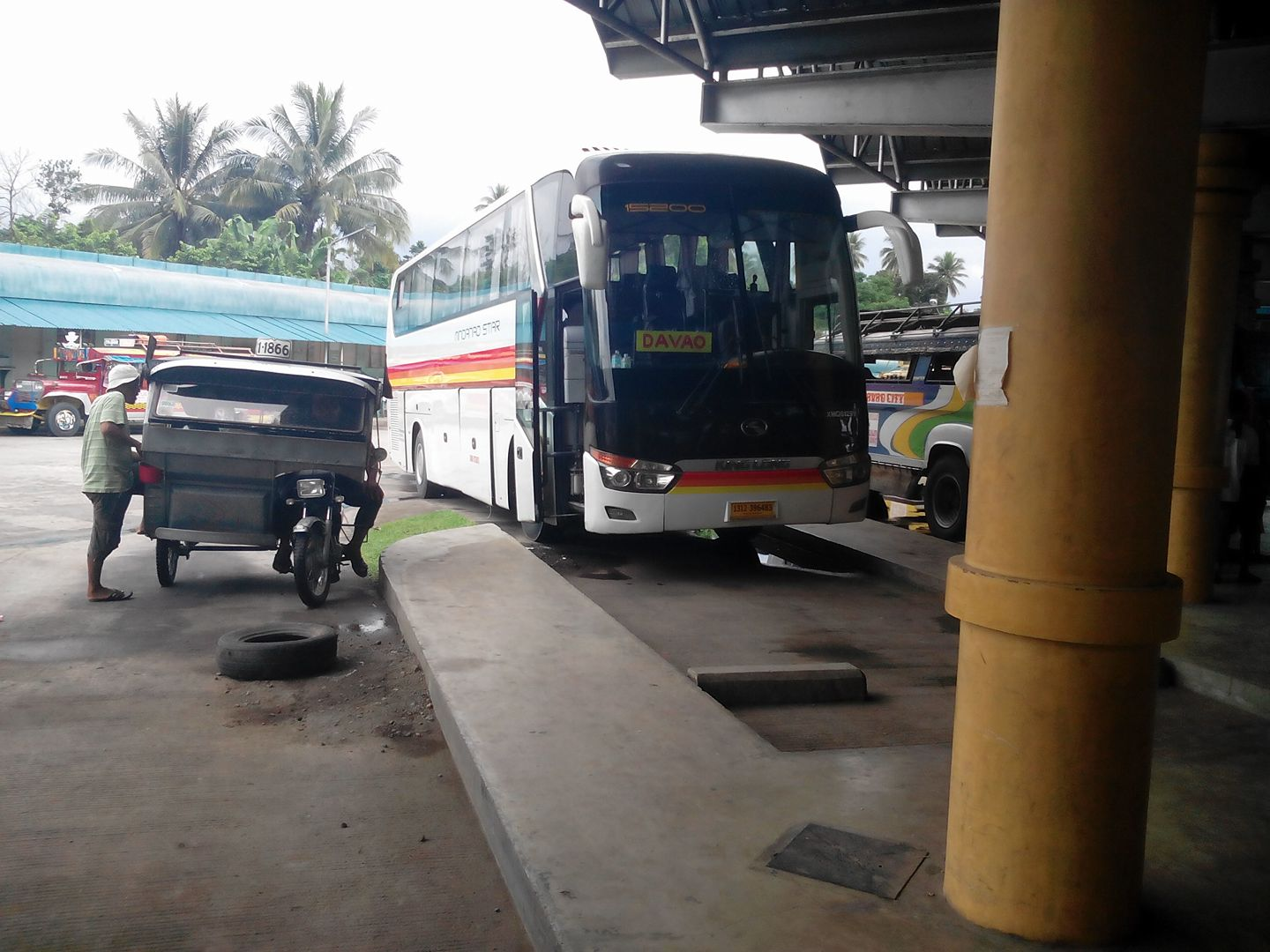
Mindanao Star's King Long XMQ6129Y plying the Davao-Cotabato route moored at Kidapawan City terminal

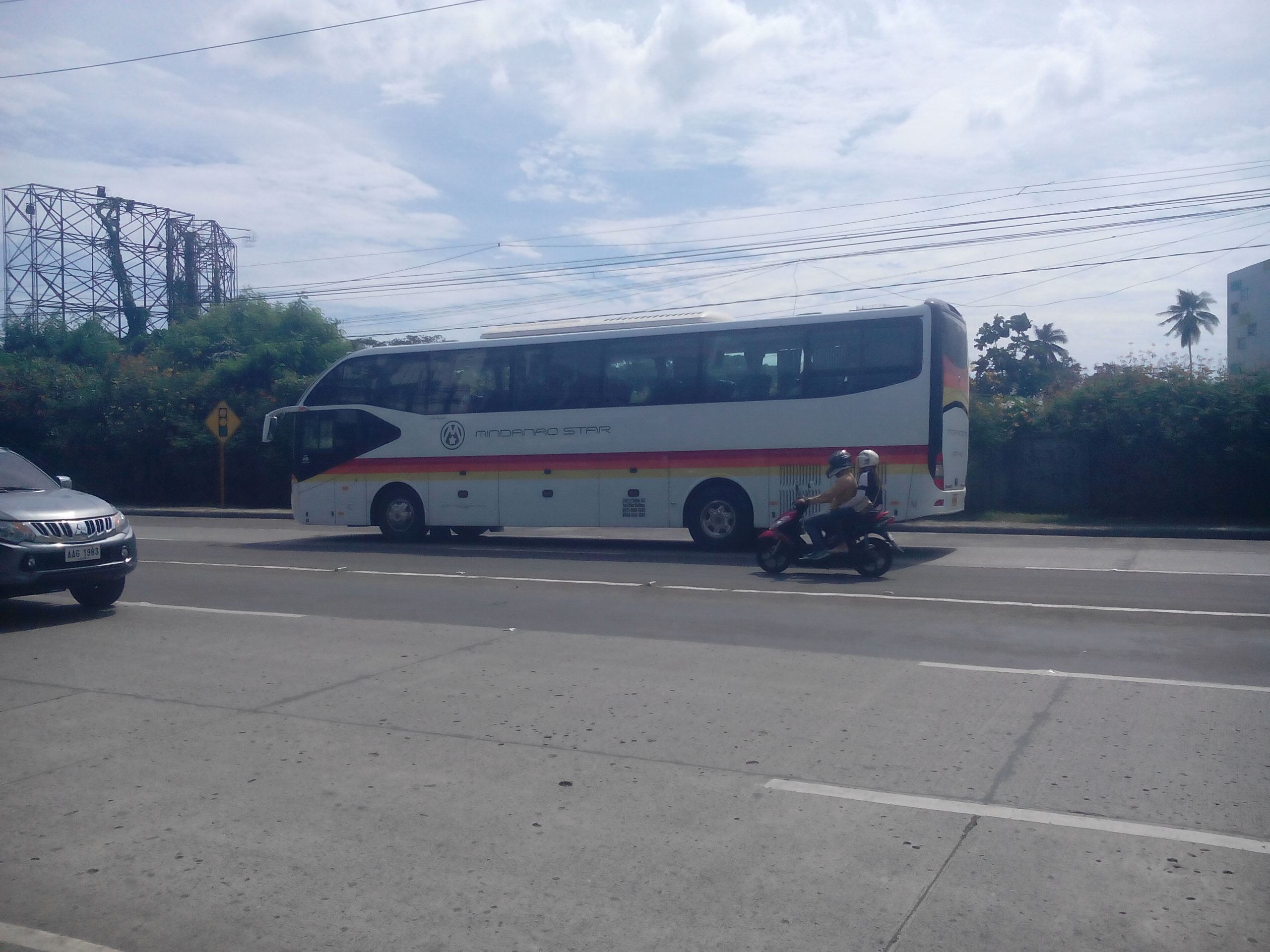
Yutong ZK6127HA of Mindanao Star in Davao City, plying the Davao-General Santos-Marbel

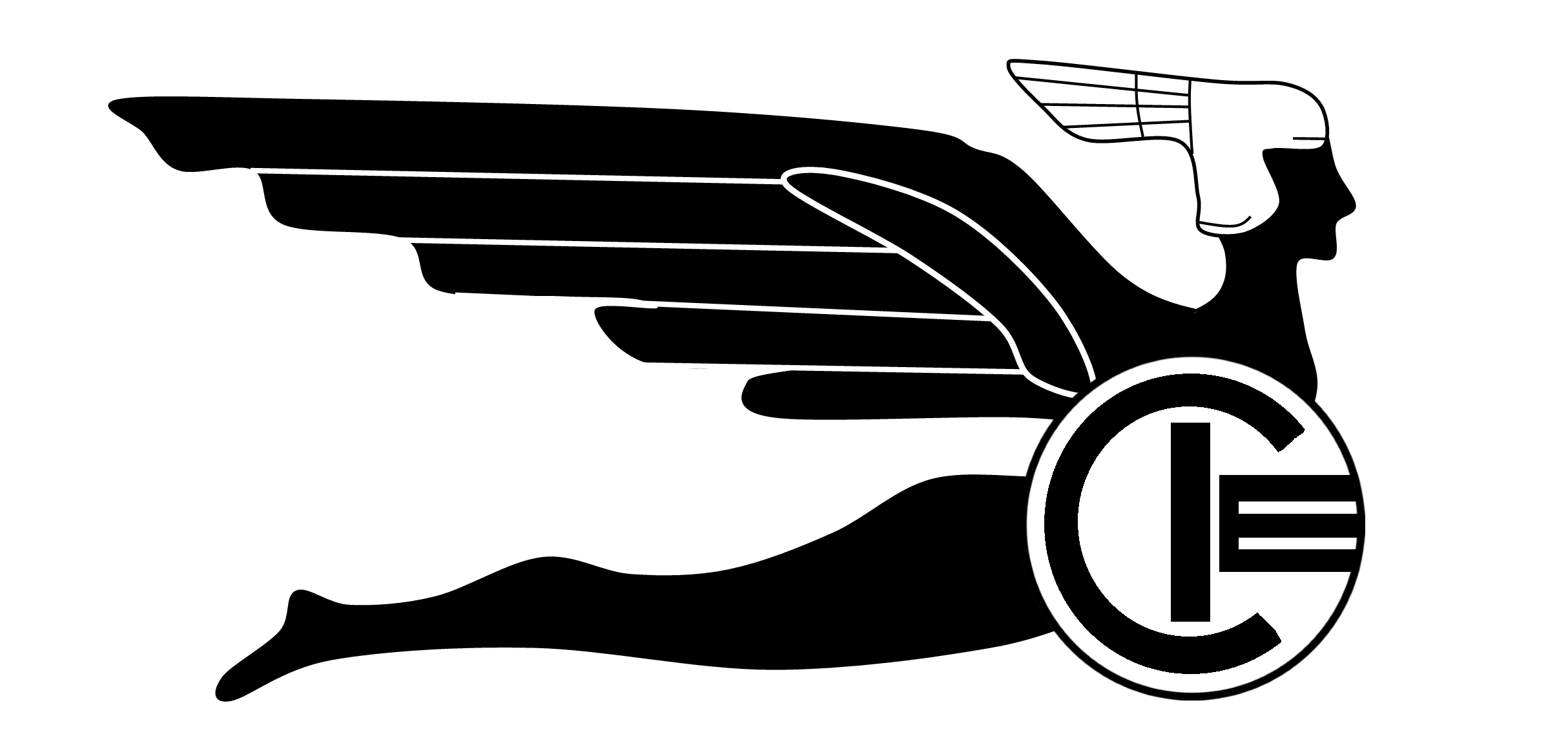
A logo of Mindanao Star's subsidiary "Island City Express"

== See also ==
- Vallacar Transit
- Ceres Transport
- Davao Metro Shuttle
- Husky Tours
- Yellow Bus Line
- List of bus companies of the Philippines
