= YLB =

YLB or ylb may refer to:

- YLB, the IATA code for Lac La Biche Airport, Alberta, Canada
- ylb, the ISO 639-3 code for Yaleba language, Milne Bay Province, Papua New Guinea
