= Yellow Bus Line =

Bus company in the Philippines

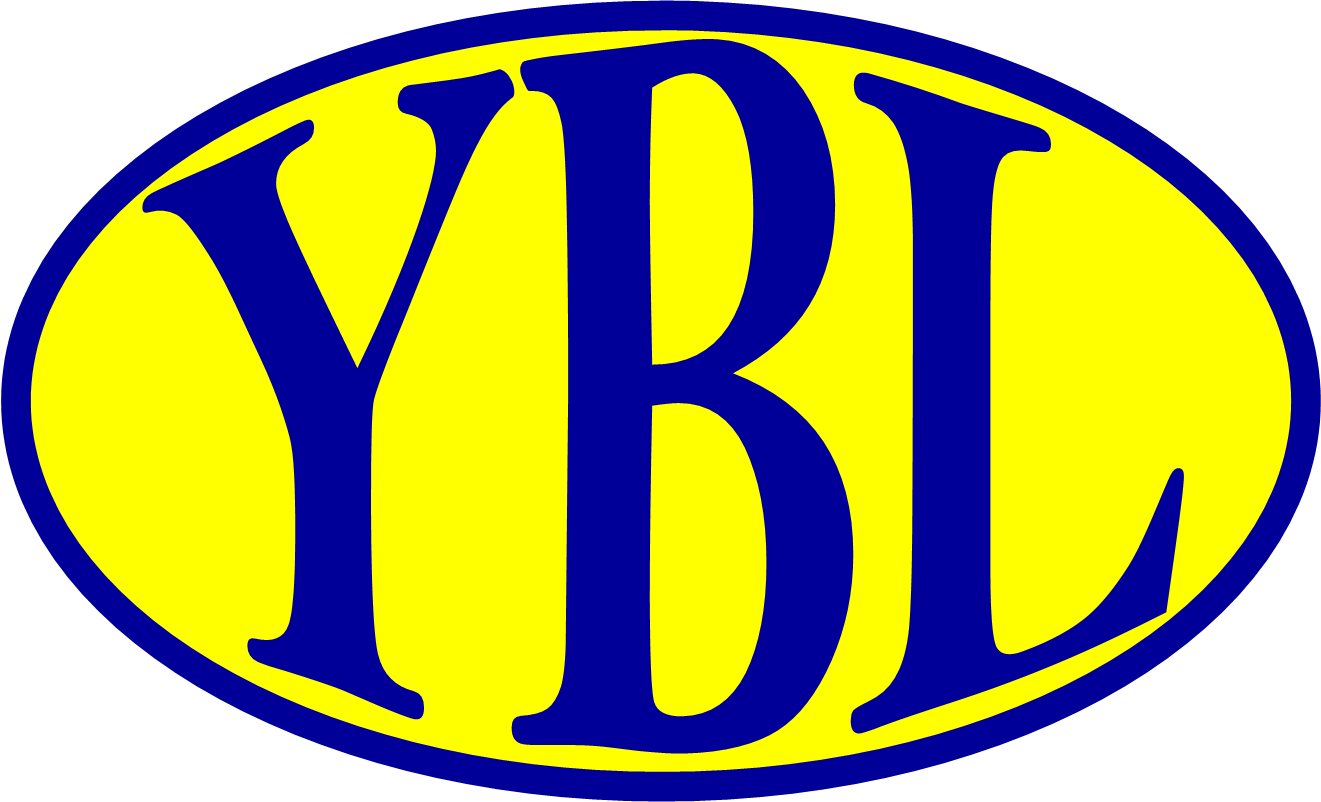

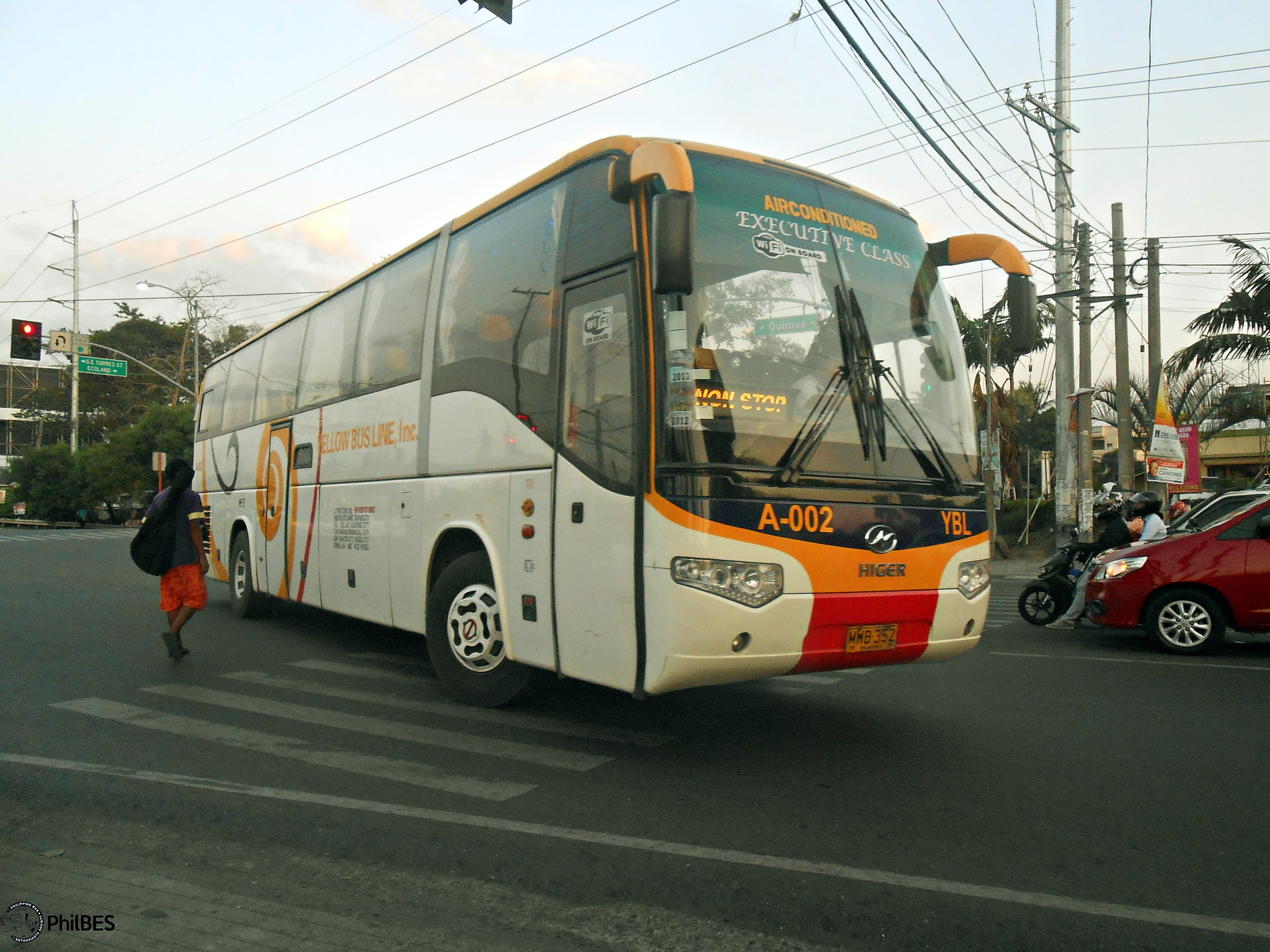
- Yellow Bus Line A-002
- Founded: July 13, 1958
- Headquarters: National Highway, Barangay Dadiangas East, General Santos
- Locale: Mindanao
- Service area: Davao Region; Soccsksargen
- Service type: Provincial Operation
- Destinations: General Santos; Koronadal; Davao City; Tacurong; Digos; Kidapawan
- Hubs: General Santos; Koronadal
- Fleet: 250+

Yellow Bus Line, Incorporated (YBLI) is a large bus company in Mindanao. It operates bus transport services in central and southern Mindanao with its headquarters in General Santos. Its company-owned terminals and offices are located in General Santos and Koronadal City.

== History ==
Yellow Bus Line Incorporated was founded on 13 July 1958 by the Yap Family of the Municipality of Koronadal (also known as Marbel, now called City of Koronadal) in South Cotabato. Yellow Bus Line is the first bus company and the second largest in Mindanao with more than 200 units plying the routes in Sultan Kudarat, South Cotabato, Maguindanao del Norte, Maguindanao del Sur, Cotabato, Sarangani, and Davao City. Their base of operations are located in Koronadal and General Santos. YBL is the first bus company in the Philippines to implement fixed regular wage for its drivers and conductors. In year 2015 they conducted NC III qualification exams for all their drivers and conductors.

Prior to 2011, the main fare classes for the company's bus units were the non-airconditioned Super Deluxe and the airconditioned Mabuhay Class units. In 2011, as they bought Higer Bus and Yutong units from China, they introduced the Premiere Class unit, equipped with WiFi internet connection. A year later in 2012, as they procured the first bus unit in Mindanao with a built-in comfort room from Higer Bus, they introduced the Executive Class unit, also equipped with WiFi internet connection.

In March 2017, they procured their first bus units from Ankai. In June of the same year, they also purchased units from Zhongtong.

On July 5, 2019, the company entered the General Santos – Kidapawan, marking the first time it serviced an area in Cotabato. On February 21, 2026, Yellow Bus Line launched their route between Isulan and Kulaman.

== Fleet ==
As of May 2026.

Manufacturer	Bus	In service	Class
Ankai	Ankai HFF6119KE5B	4	Premier Class
Higer	Higer KLQ6129AQE3	2	Executive Class
Higer	Higer KLQ6125B	11	Executive Class
Higer	Higer KLQ6123K	6	Executive Class
Higer	Higer KLQ6127K	2	Executive Class
Higer	Higer KLQ6119AQE3	10	Premier Class
Higer	Higer KLQ6109AQE3	11	Premier Class
Higer	Higer KLQ6896A	5	Premier Class
Higer	Higer KLQ6127LA (Tourist)	10	Premier Class
Higer	Higer KLQ6118H	30	Premier Class
Higer	Higer KLQ6126LY (V12)	5	Premier Class
Hino	Hino RK Grandeza	2	Cargo Bus
Yutong	Yutong ZK6122HD9	17	Executive Class
Yutong	Yutong ZK6122HD	11	Premier Class
Yutong	Yutong ZK6107HA	79	Mabuhay & Premier
Yutong	Yutong ZK6107HA	79	Super Deluxe Class
Yutong	Yutong ZK6119H2	12	Premier Class
Yutong	Yutong ZK6128H C12 Pro	25	Exclusive Class
Yutong	Yutong ZK6858H	3	Premier Class
Zhongtong	Zhongtong LCK6128H	8	Elite Class
Zhongtong	Zhongtong LCK6118H	10	Executive Class
Zhongtong	Zhongtong LCK6119H (H11)	5	Premier Class
Zhongtong	Zhongtong LCK6129H (H12)	5	Premier Class

== Routes of service ==
When the Yellow Bus Line was first established in 1958, its first route of service was Cagayan de Oro–Koronadal route. However, the said route was discontinued in the year 1978 in favour of the then-newly opened Davao–General Santos–Marbel route which they continue to serve to this day. The company continued to expand its service area throughout the years, serving the provinces of South Cotabato, Sarangani, Sultan Kudarat, Cotabato, Davao del Sur, Maguindanao del Norte, Maguindanao del Sur. The routes serviced by Yellow Bus Line are all vice versa.

- General Santos – Isulan (via Tacurong)
- General Santos – Esperanza (via Surallah & Isulan)
- General Santos – Maitum (via Kiamba)
- General Santos – Kidapawan (via Datu Paglas & M'lang)
- General Santos – Koronadal (placards and LEDs are shown as Marbel)
- Davao City – General Santos (placards and LEDs are shown as Gensan)
- Davao City – Tacurong (via Makilala & M'lang)
- Davao City – Kulaman (via Makilala & Tacurong)
- Davao City – Koronadal (via General Santos)
- Koronadal – Isulan (via Tacurong)

== Gallery ==
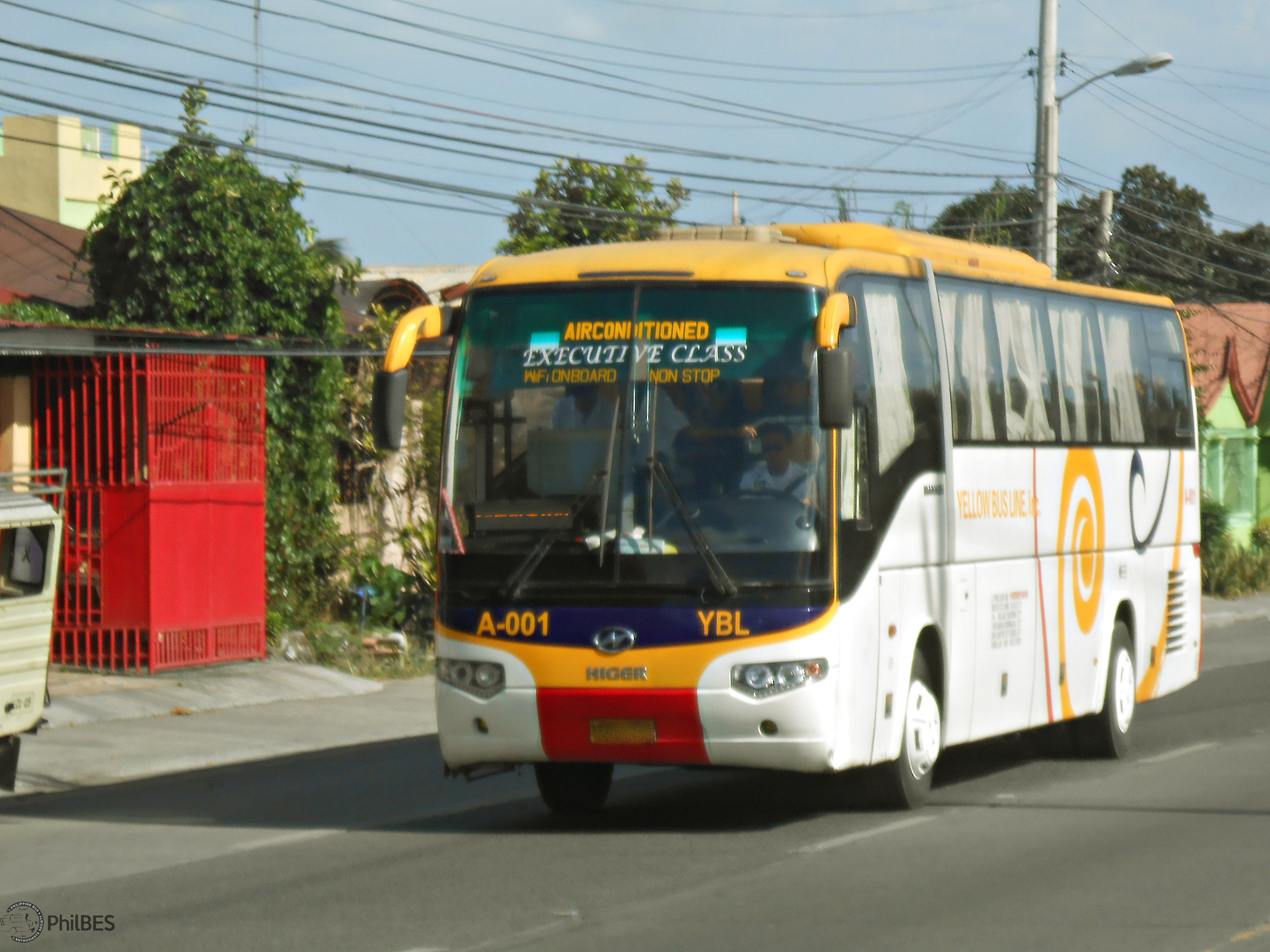
Higer KLQ6122QA3 A-001 Executive Class

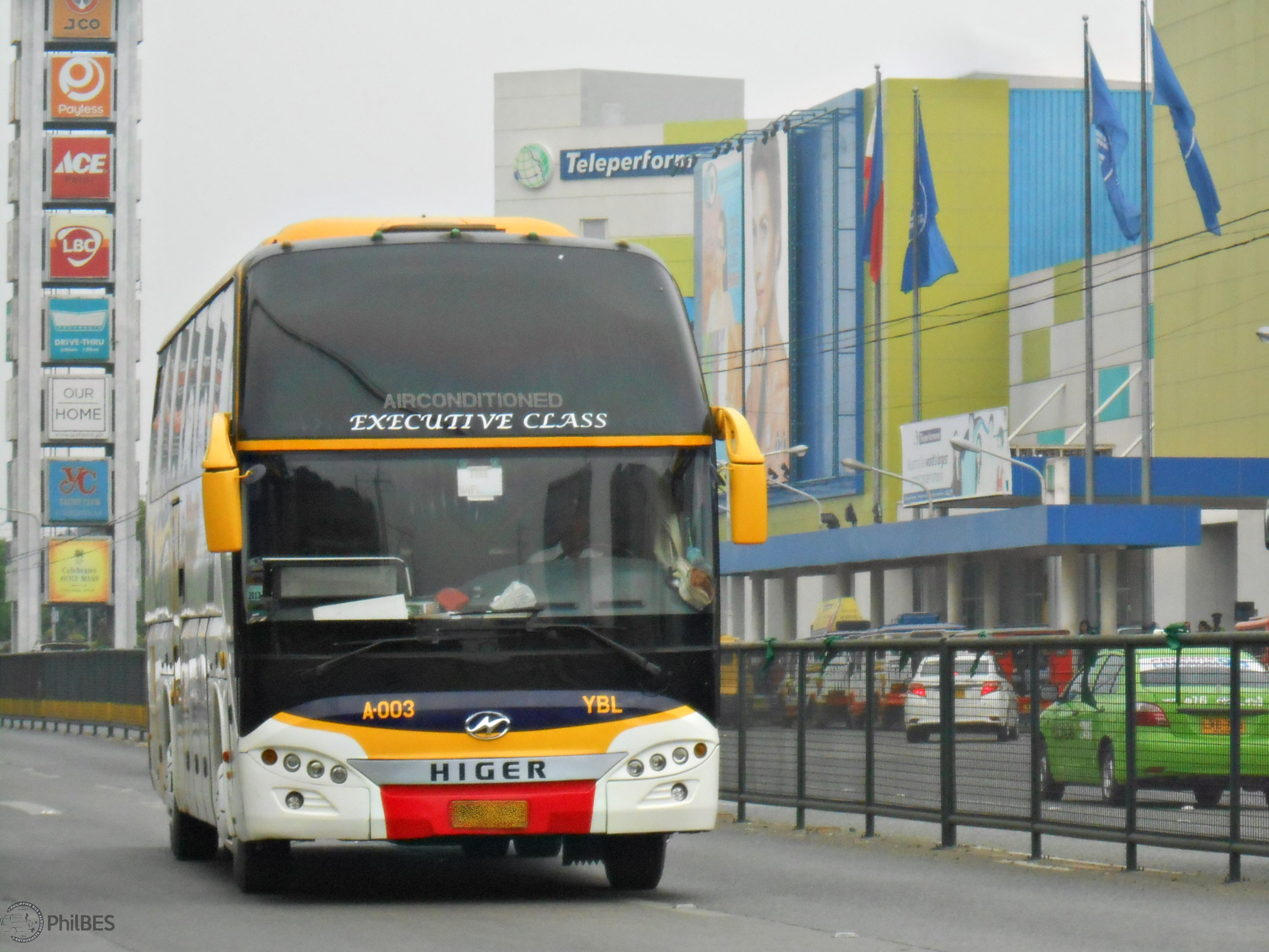
Higer KLQ6125B A-003 Executive Class

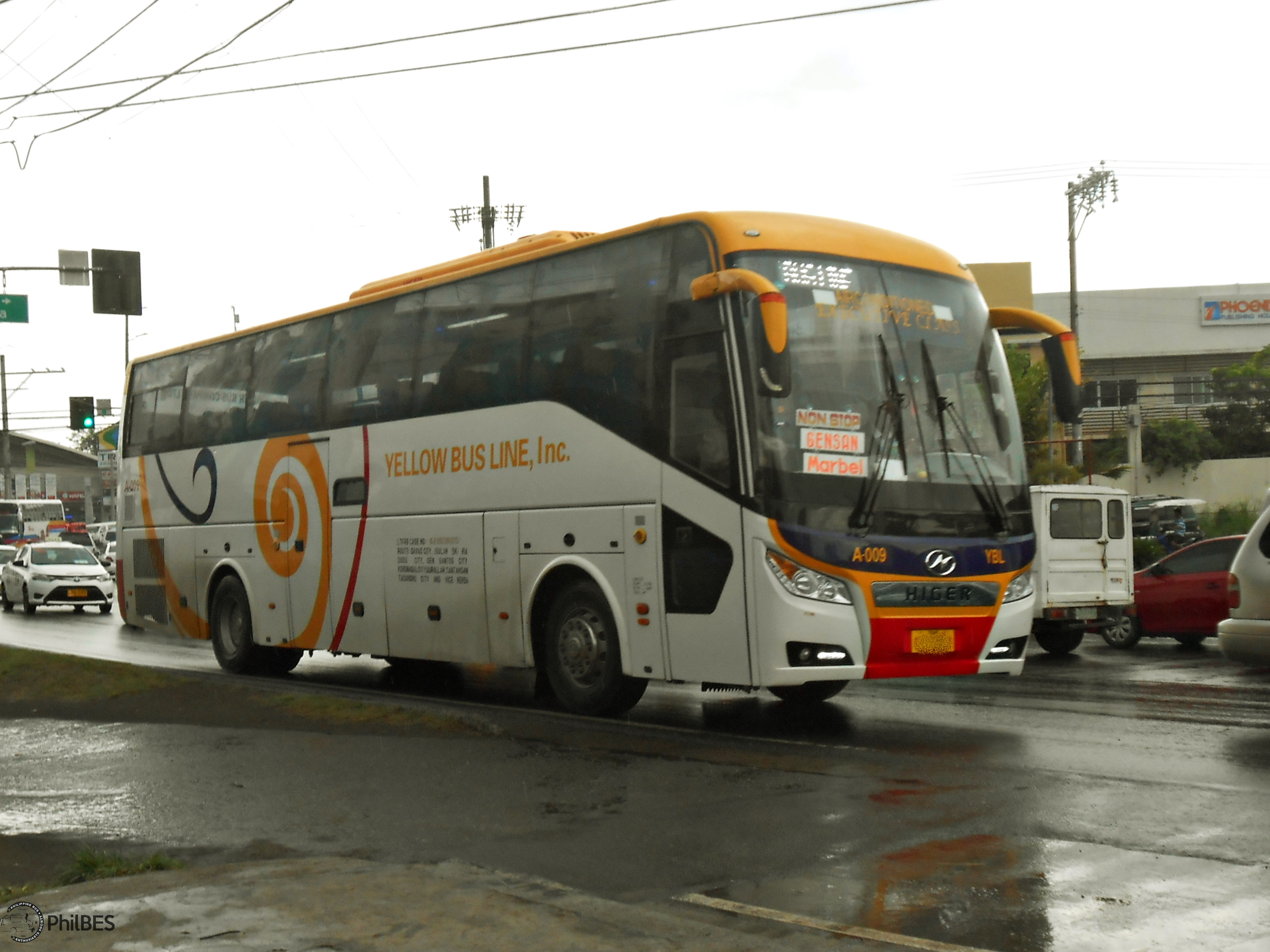
Higer KLQ6123K "U-Tour" A-009 Executive Class

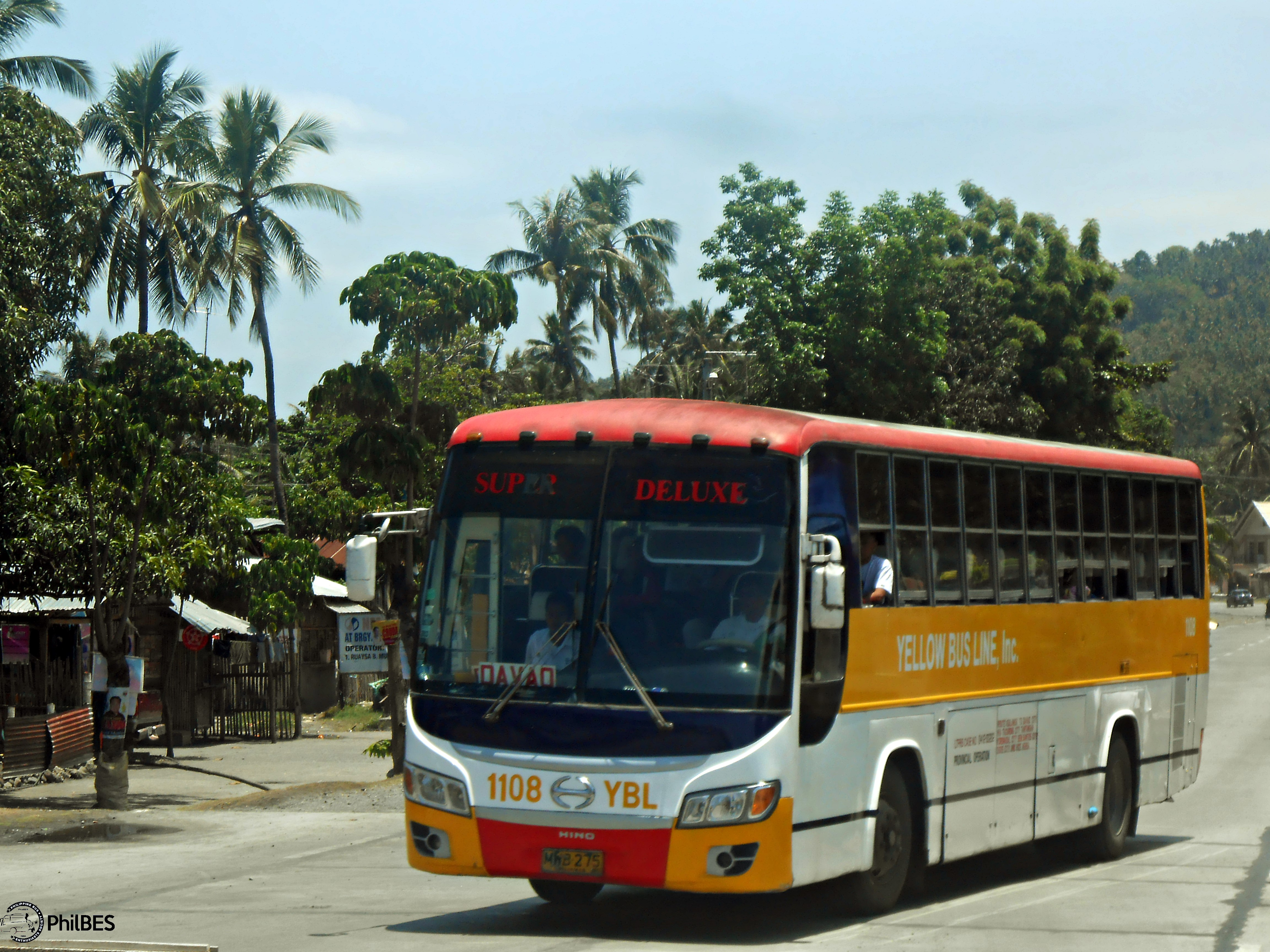
Hino RK 1108 Super Deluxe

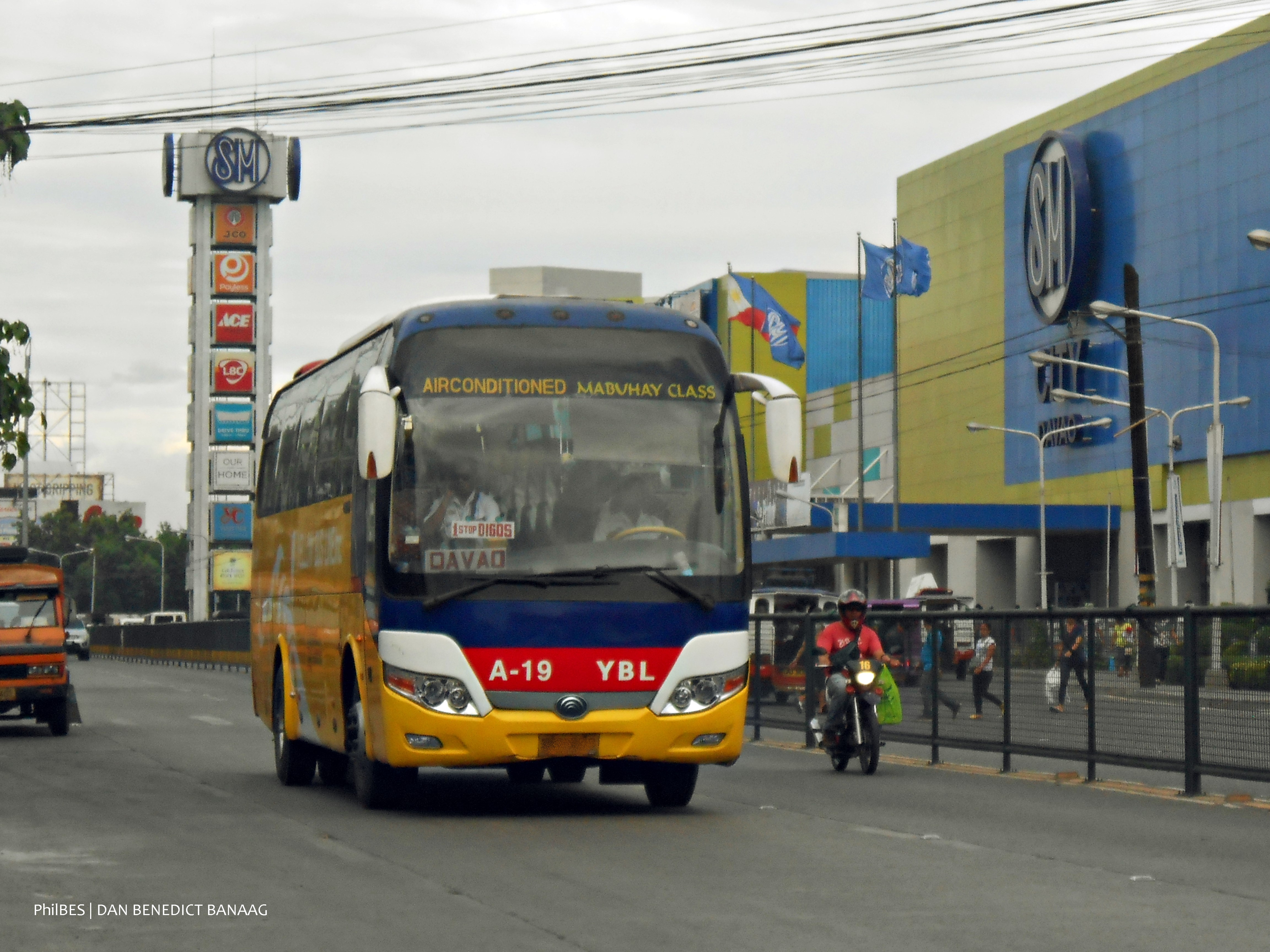
Yutong ZK6107HA "Surot" Premier Class

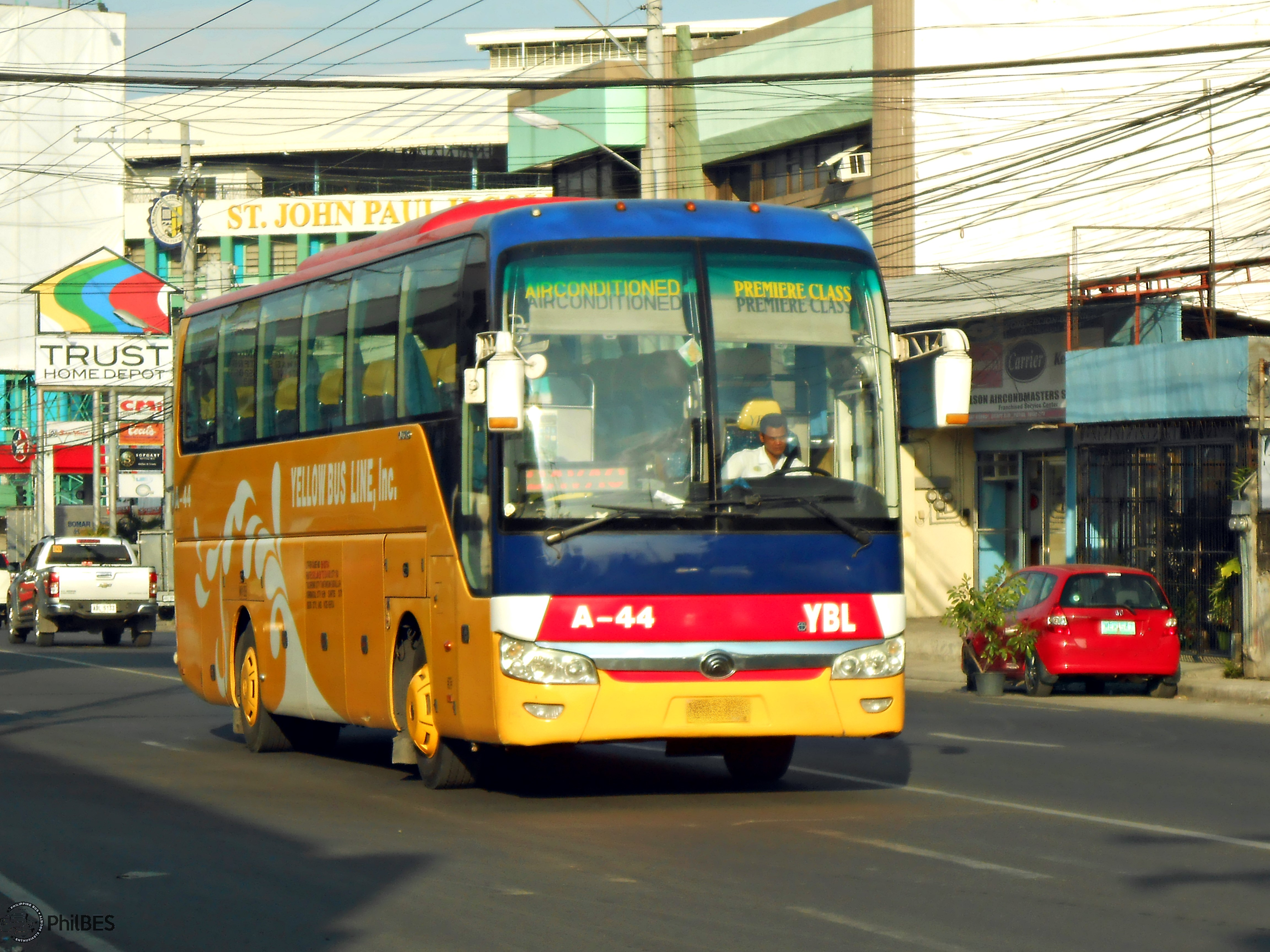
Yutong ZK6122HD A-44 Premier class

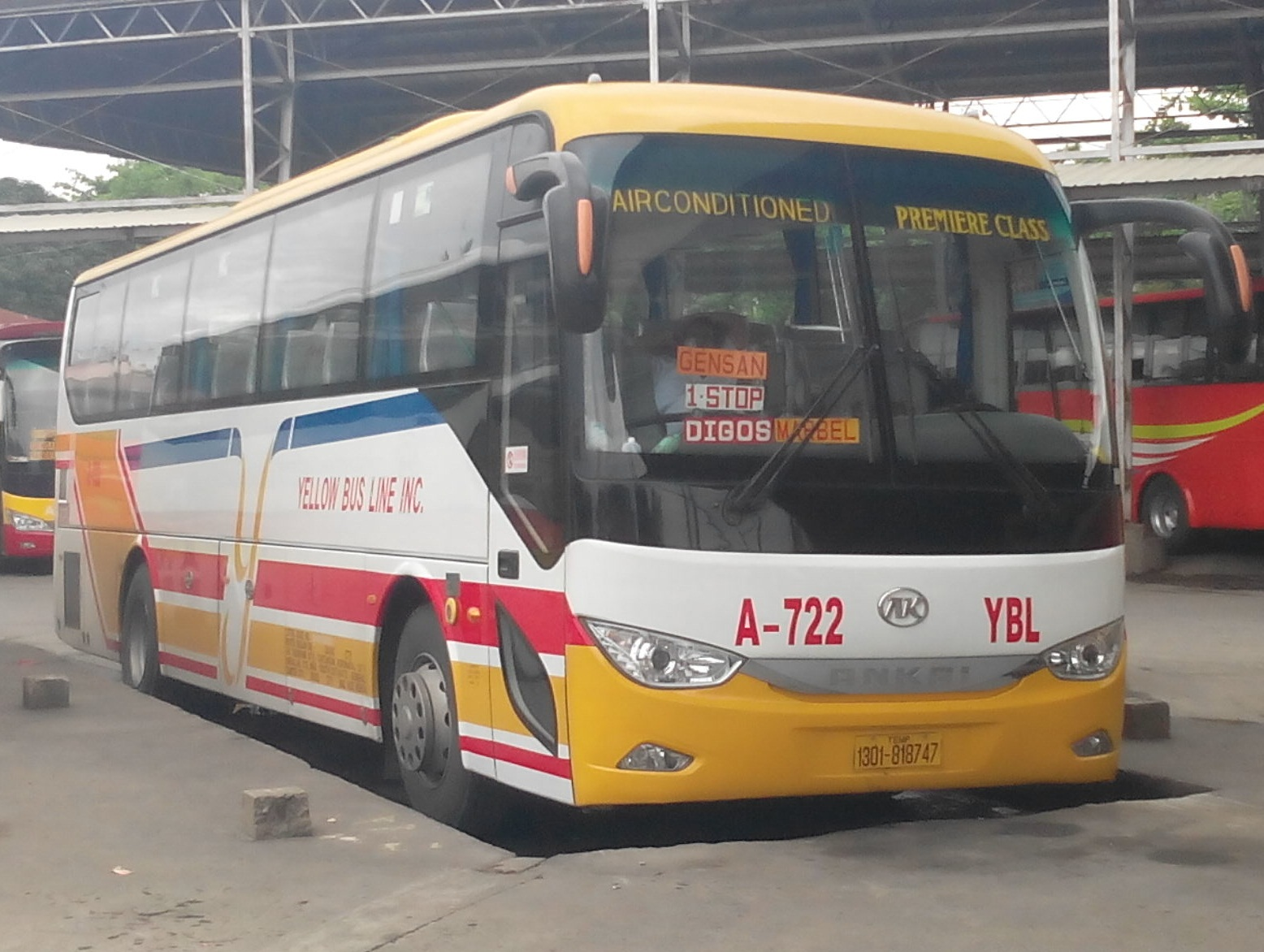
Ankai HFF6119KDE5B Premiere Class

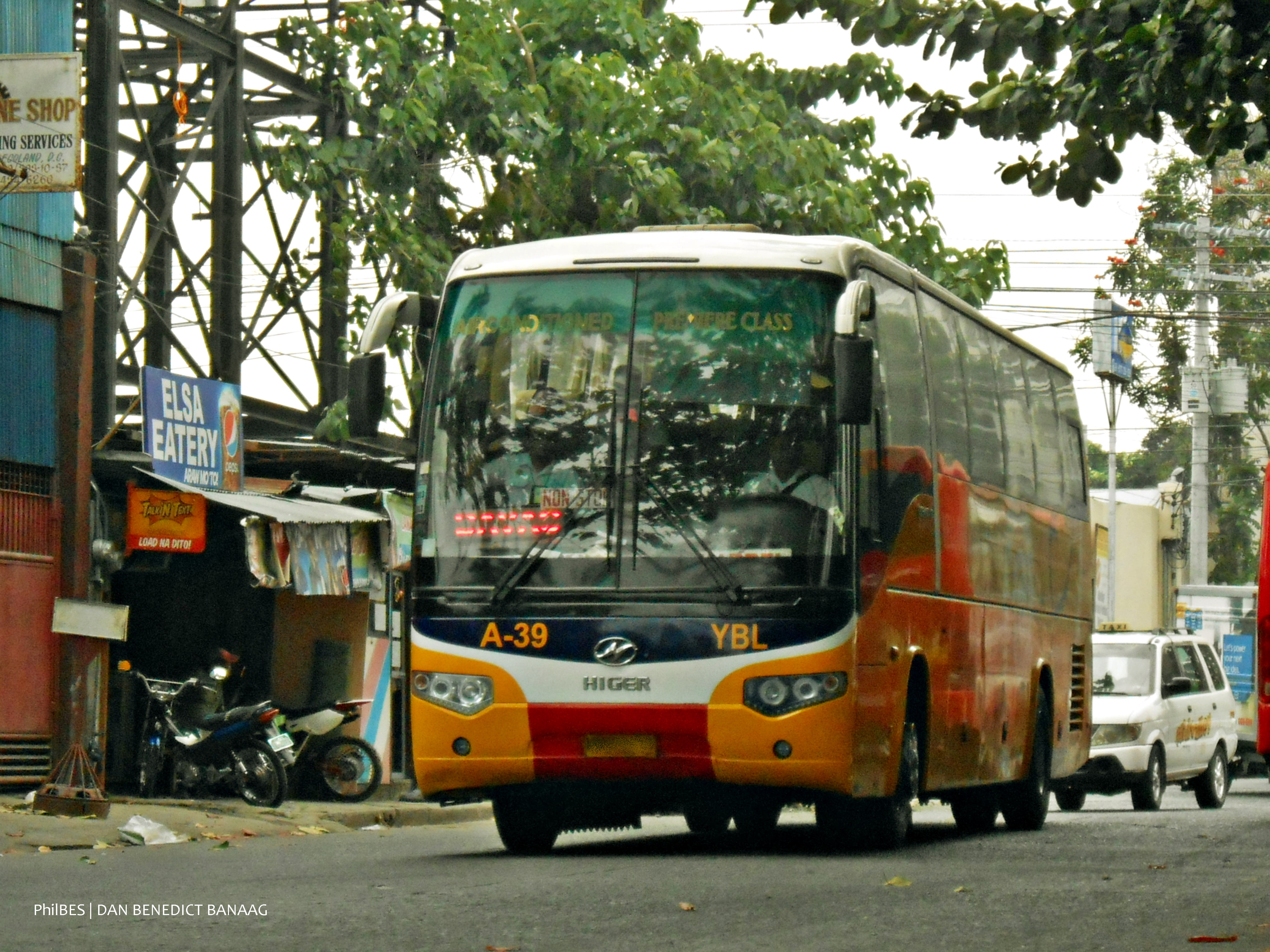
Higer KLQ6119QA3 A-39 Premier class

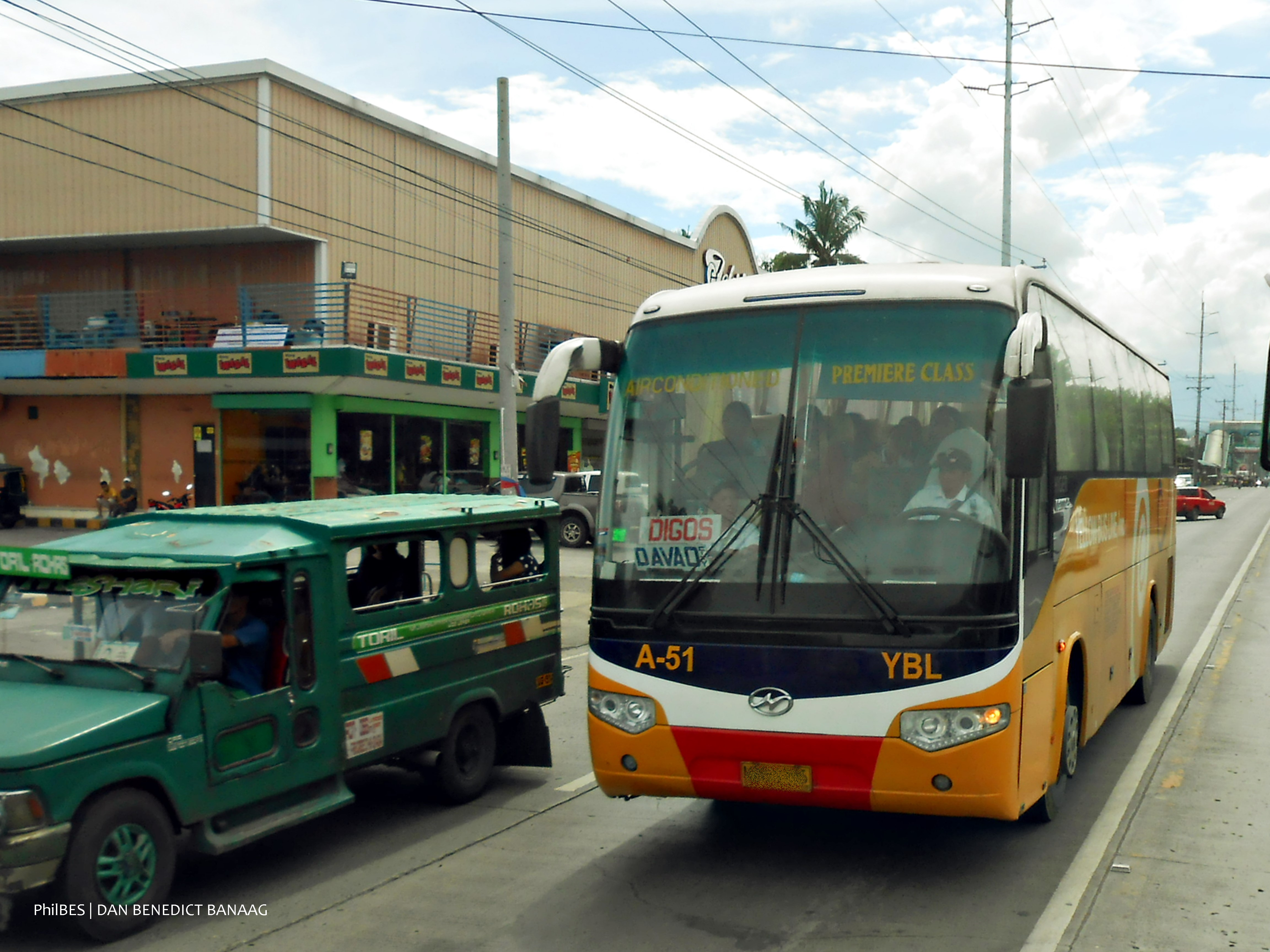
Higer KLQ6109QAE A-51 Premier Class

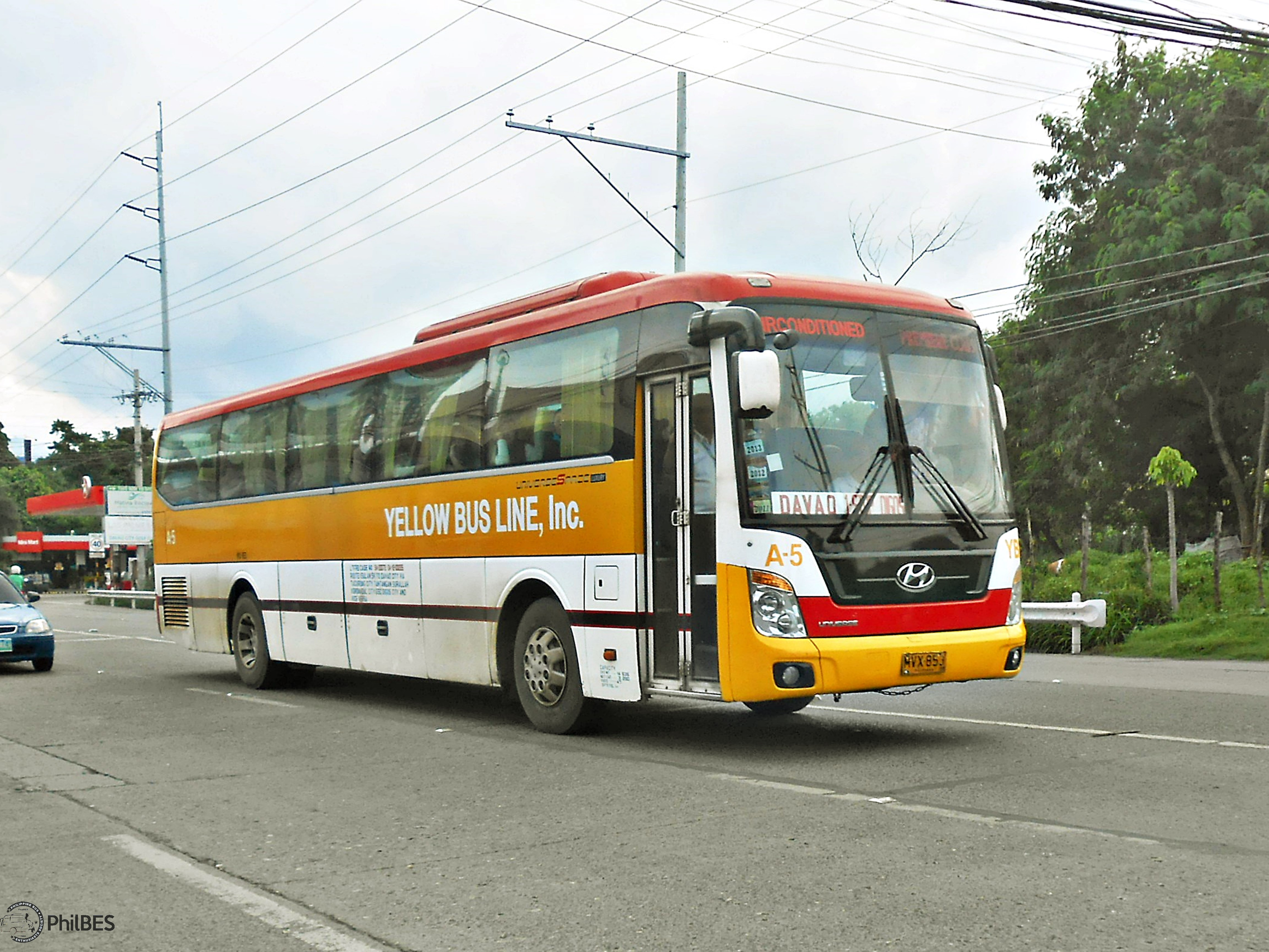
Hyundai Universe Space Luxury A-5 Premier Class

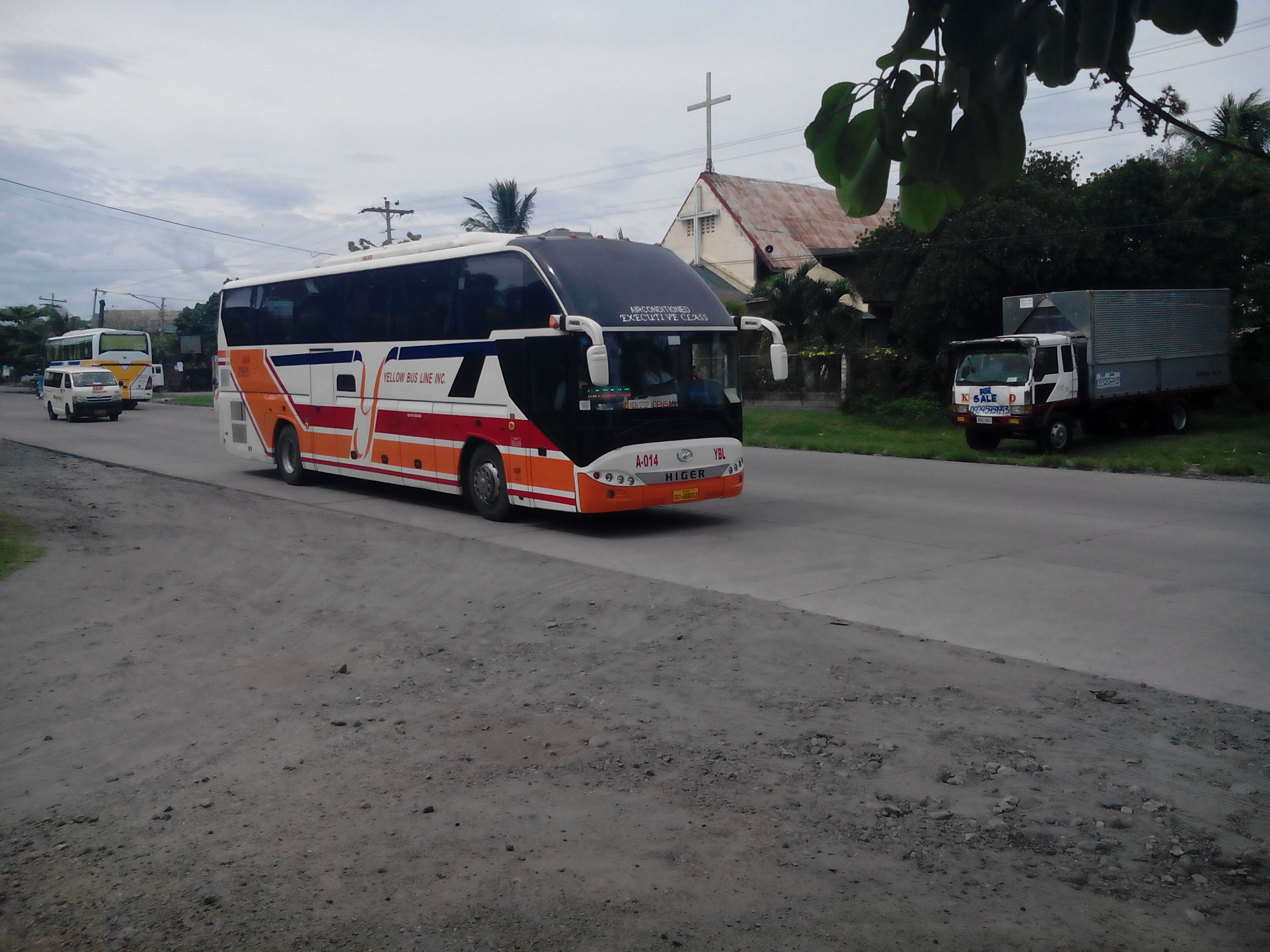
Higer KLQ6125B Executive Class in 1990s livery

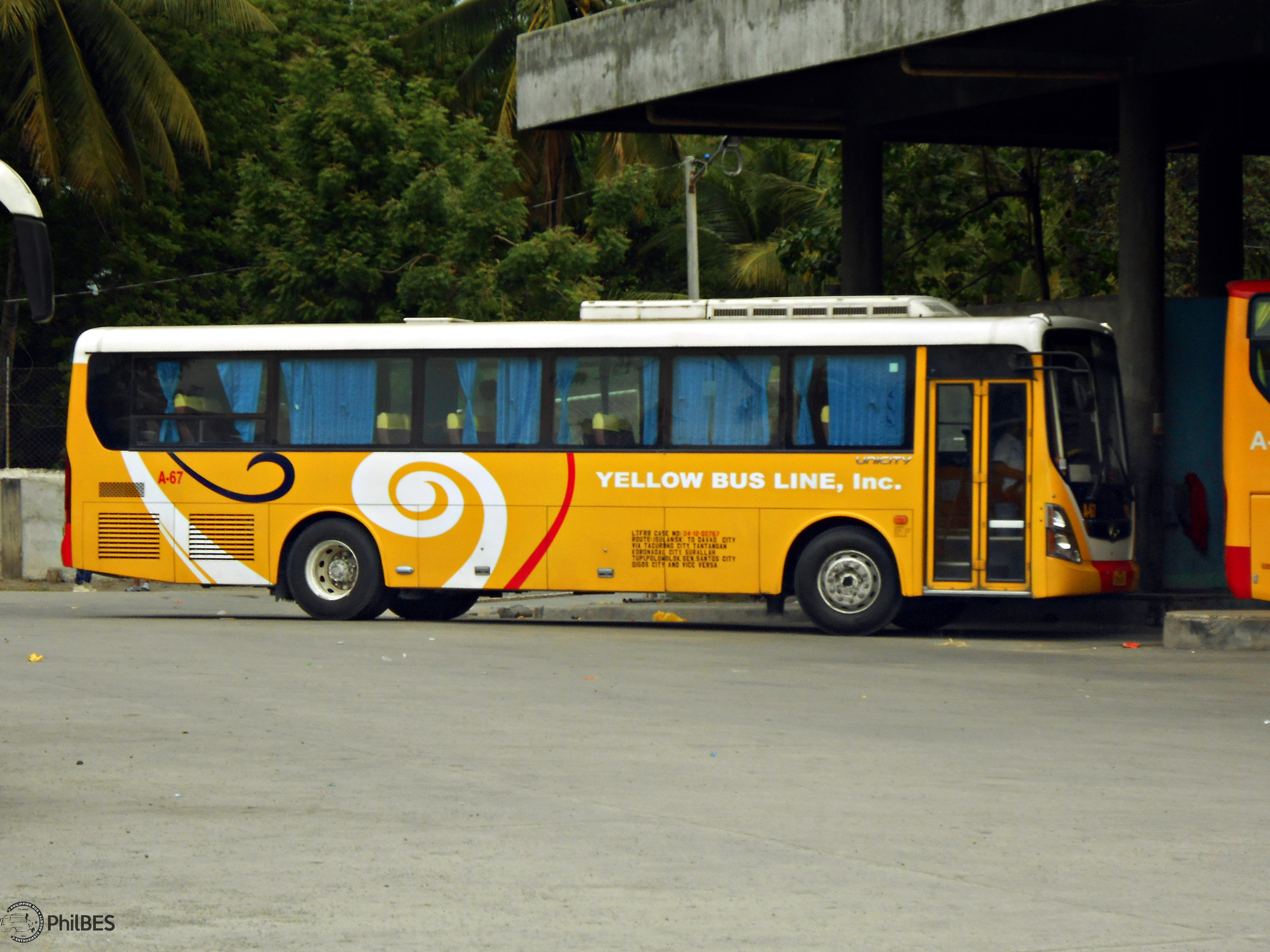
Hyundai UniCity A-67 Premier Class

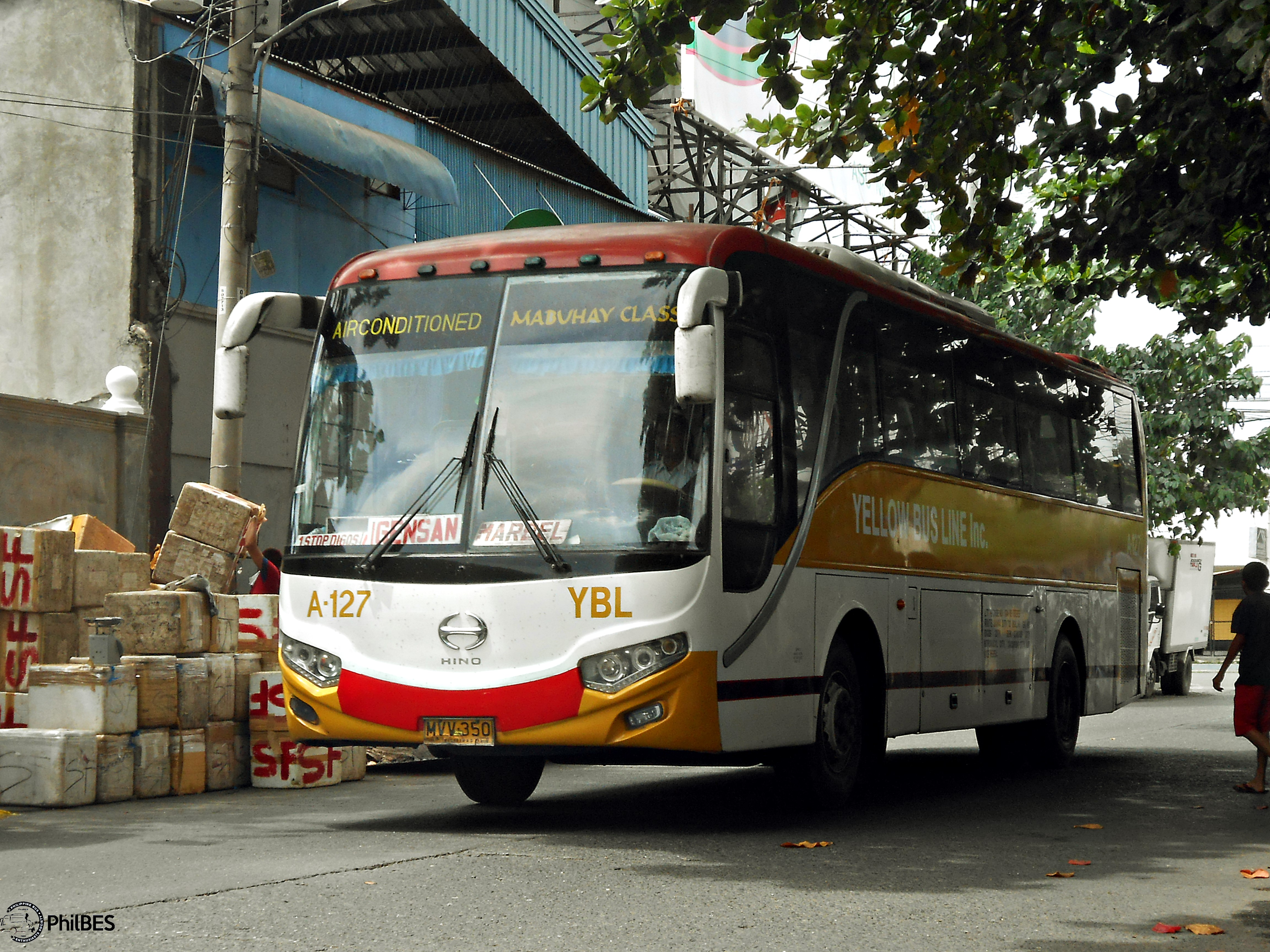
Hino RK A-127 Mabuhay Class

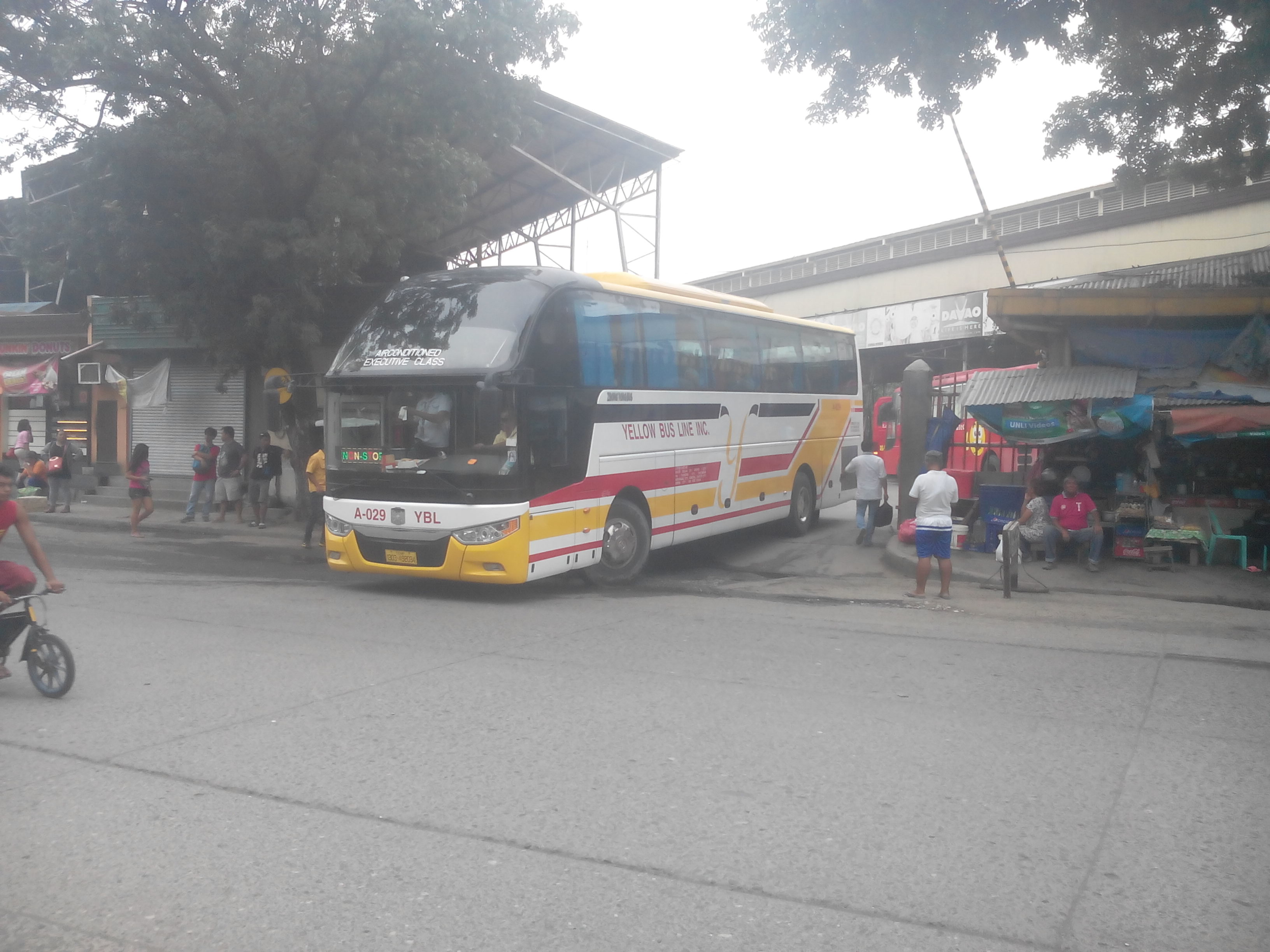
Zhongtong LCK6128H "Magnate" A-030 Elite Class

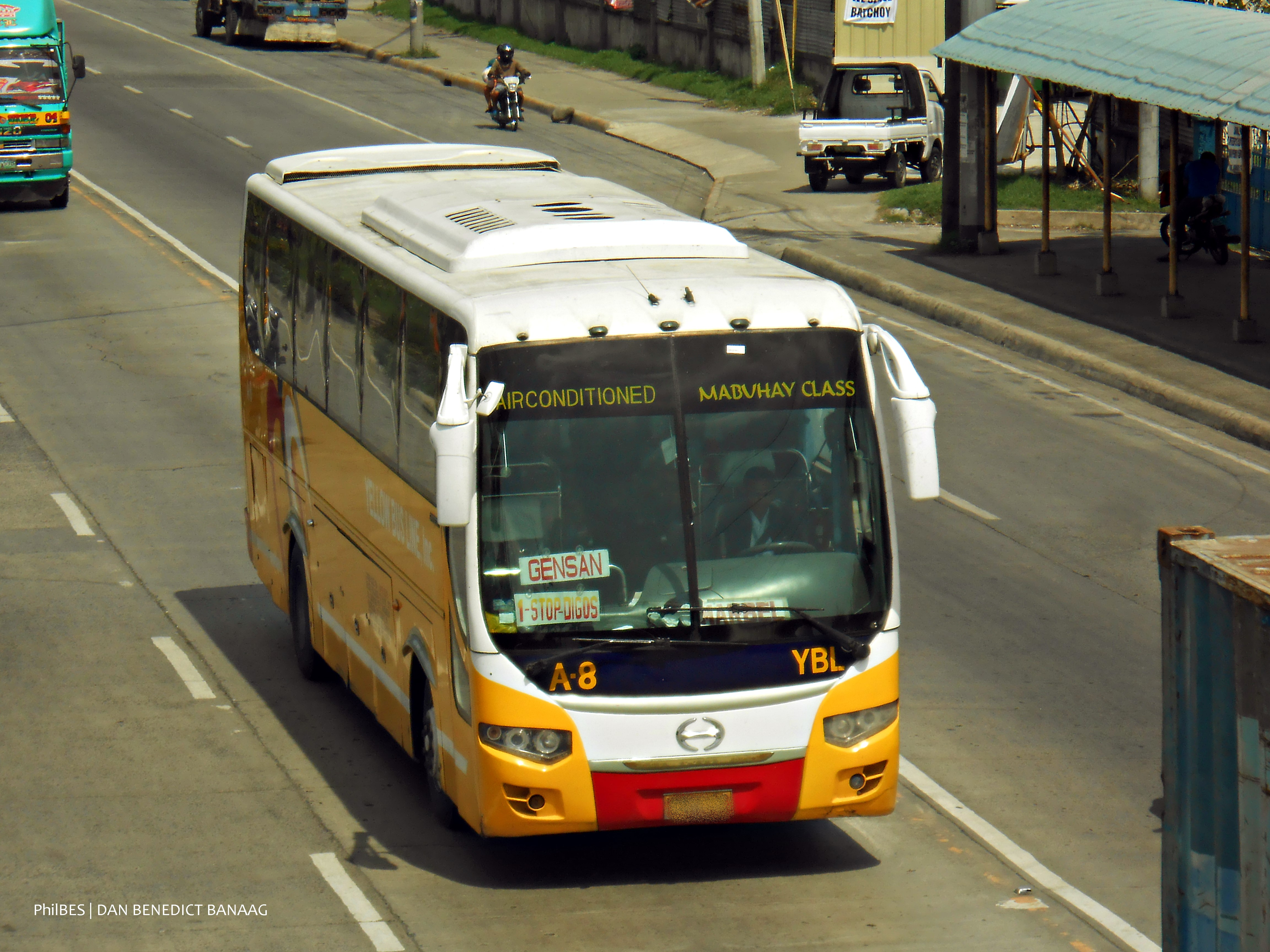
Hino Grandeza A-8 Mabuhay Class

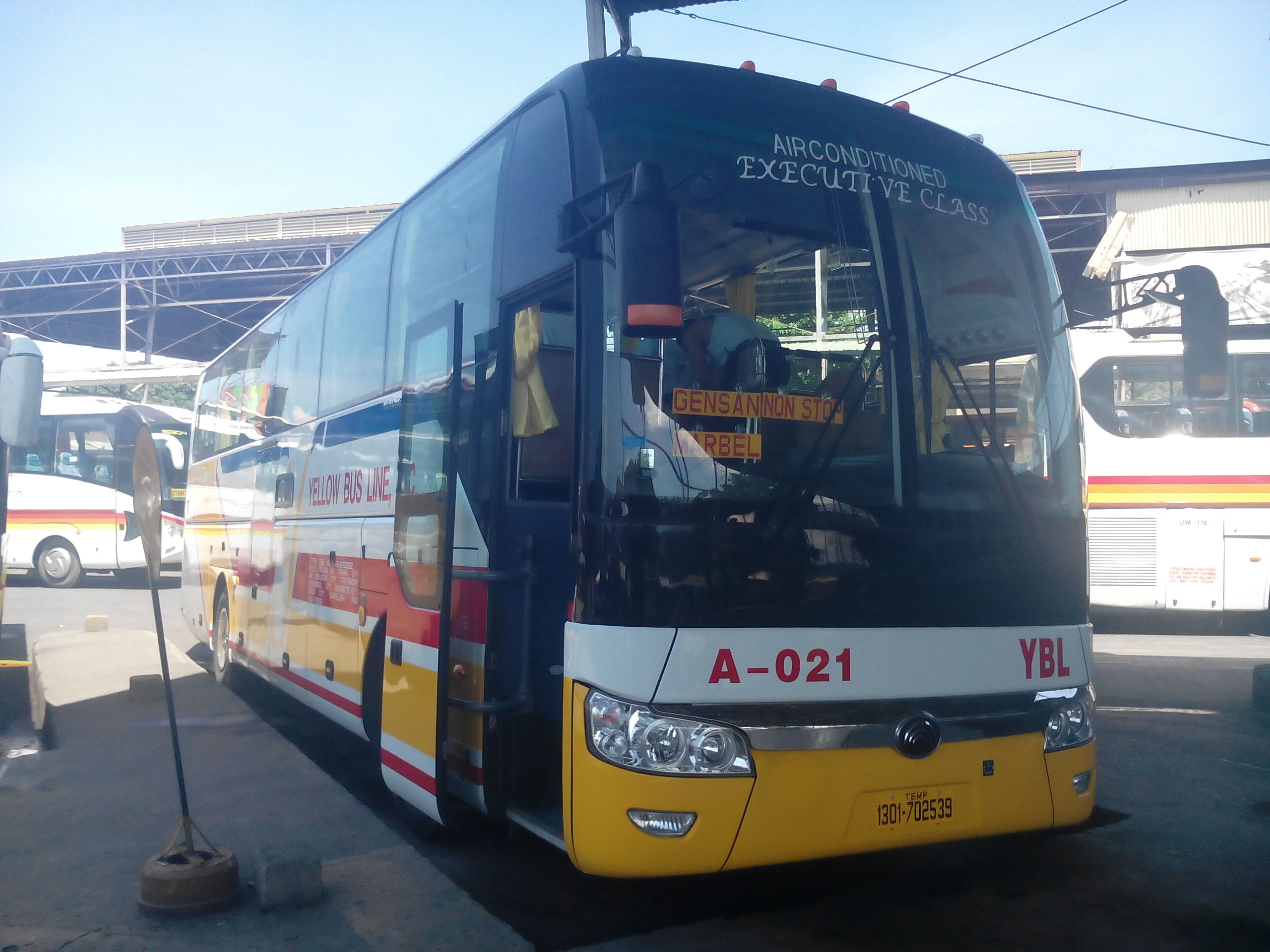
Yutong ZK6122HD9 A-021 Executive Class

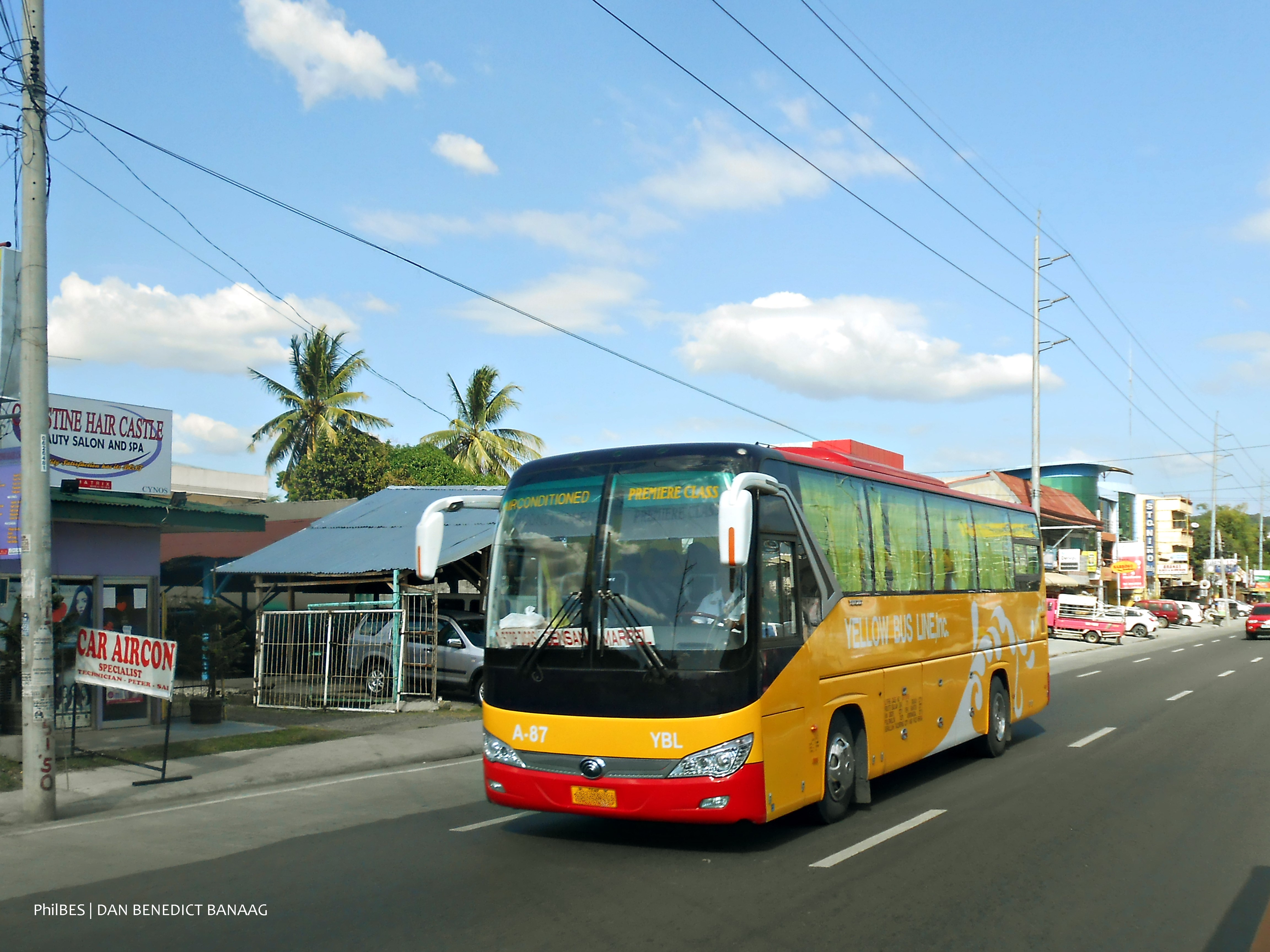
Yutong ZK6119H2 A-87 Premier Class unit

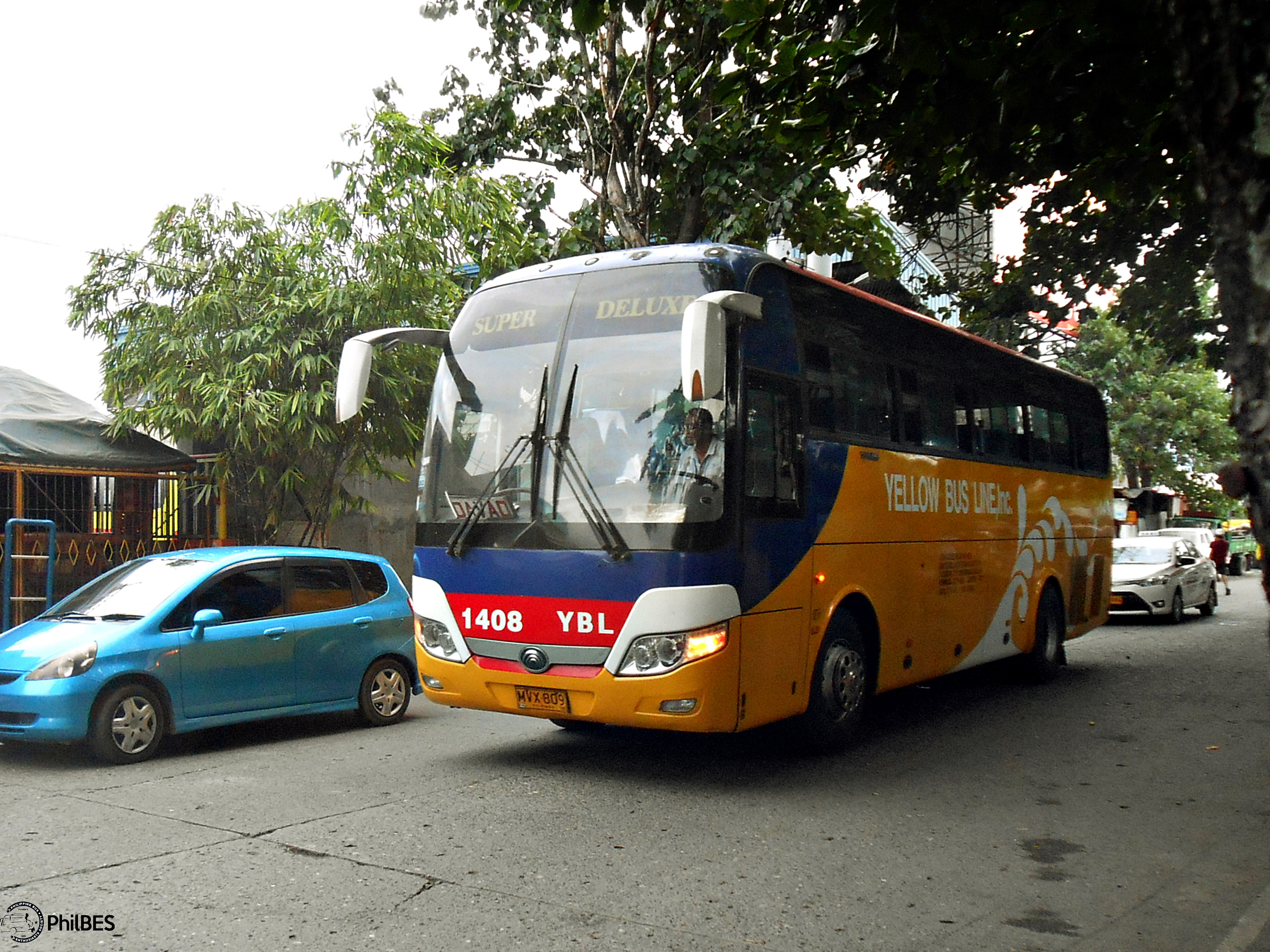
Yutong ZK6107HA "Ordinary Surot" 1408 Super Deluxe

== See also ==
- Davao Metro Shuttle
- Husky Tours
- Mindanao Star Bus Transport, Inc.
- List of bus companies of the Philippines
