= Kalamansig =

Municipality in Sultan Kudarat, Philippines

- Municipality
- Municipality of Kalamansig
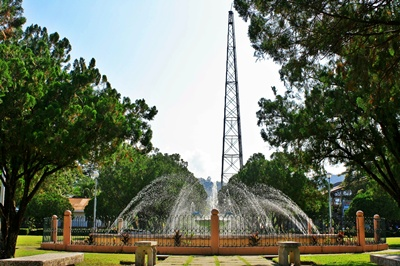
- Public Park with Communication Tower

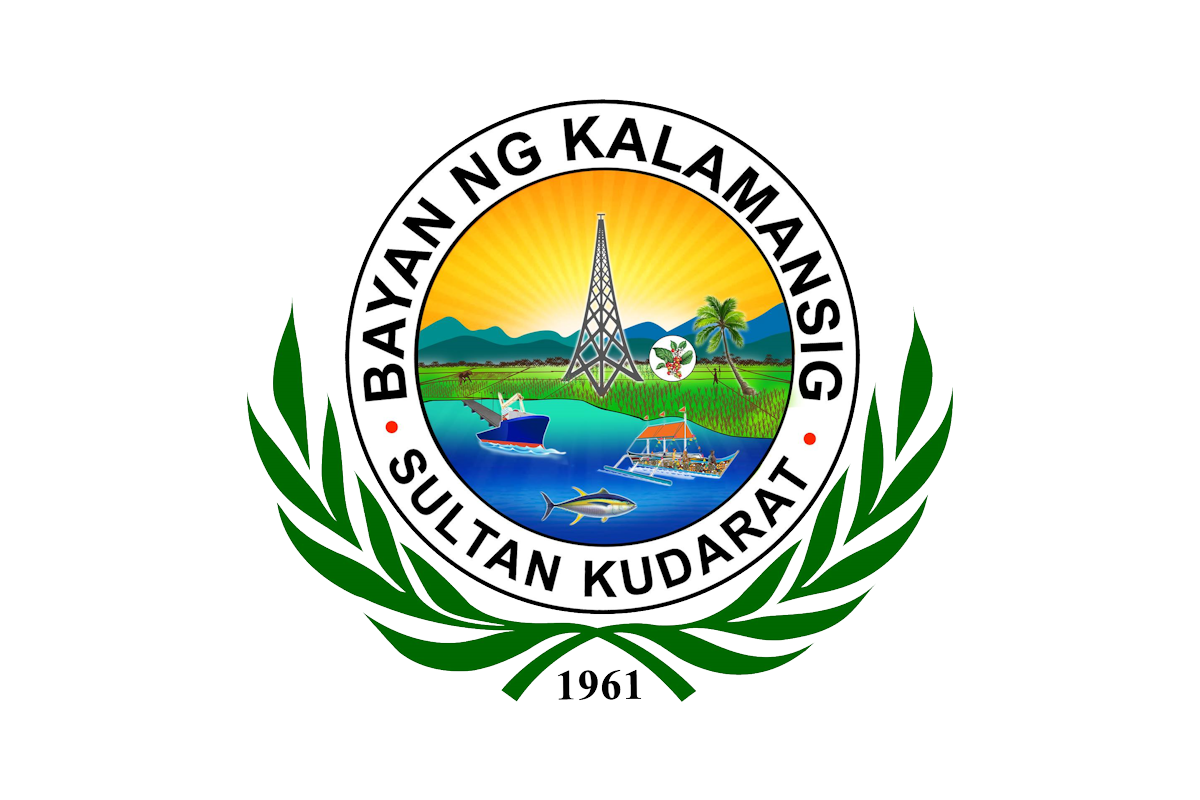
- Flag Seal

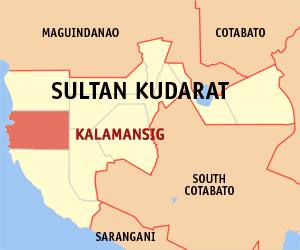
- Map of Sultan Kudarat with Kalamansig highlighted
- Interactive map of Kalamansig
- Location within the Philippines
- Coordinates: 6°33′21″N 124°03′02″E
- Country: Philippines
- Region: Soccsksargen
- Province: Sultan Kudarat
- District: 2nd district
- Founded: December 29, 1961
- Barangays: 15 (see Barangays)

Government
  - Type: Sangguniang Bayan
  - Mayor: Ronan Eugene C. Garcia
  - Vice Mayor: Leslie Paez Caberte
  - Representative: Bella Vanessa B. Suansing
  - Municipal Council: Members: Salvador C. Ang Jr.; Carlito T. Buenaflor; Fe M. Caang; Kristine Mae T. Concha; Ronnie T. Daniel; Jordan U. Diarol; Nurhan U. Diarol; Randy Francis C. Garcia
  - Electorate: 31,592 voters (2025)

Area
  - Total: 699.20 km^{2} (269.96 sq mi)
- Elevation: 56 m (184 ft)
- Highest elevation: 655 m (2,149 ft)
- Lowest elevation: 0 m (0 ft)

Population (2024 census)
  - Total: 52,257
  - Density: 74.738/km^{2} (193.57/sq mi)
  - Households: 12,083

Economy
  - Income class: 1st municipal income class
  - Poverty incidence: 35.41% (2023)
  - Revenue: ₱ 364.2 million (2024)
  - Assets: ₱ 613.8 million (2024)
  - Expenditure: ₱ 328.8 million (2024)
  - Liabilities: ₱ 133.1 million (2024)

Service provider
  - Electricity: Sultan Kudarat Electric Cooperative (SUKELCO)
- Time zone: UTC+8 (PST)
- ZIP code: 9808
- PSGC: 1206505000
- IDD : area code: +63 (0)64
- Native languages: Hiligaynon; Cotabato Manobo; Maguindanao; Tagalog
- Website: kalamansig.gov.ph

Kalamansig, officially the Municipality of Kalamansig (Maguindanaon: Inged nu Kalamansig, Jawi: ايڠد نو كلمانسيݢ), is a municipality in the province of Sultan Kudarat, Philippines. According to the 2024 census, it has a population of 52,257 people.

The main means of livelihood of the people is farming and fishing. The municipality's marine environment is home to various species of marine wildlife and plants, the most important of which is the giant tamilok, the largest shipworm species in the world. The species can only be found within the area, and nowhere else in the world, making Kalamansig an important biodiversity area. Formerly hunted by the locals, the giant tamiloks are now strictly protected by the municipality, specifically the former hunters of the species, after research confirmed the high importance of the species in the area's biodiversity.

The nearest point of entry is through Cotabato Airport, Cotabato City. The town can easily be reached by taking the fully cemented Upi-Lebak National Road. Convenient and safe public transport that plies directly to Kalamansig are also available at NCCC Mall Davao, General Santos Public Terminal, Cotabato City Lebak-Kalamansig Terminal and Tacurong City Public Terminal.

== Etymology ==
Like most municipalities in the Philippines, Kalamansig traces its name from various legendary origins. A popular folklore among the Manobos, a tribe of people who were among the earliest inhabitants of the place, explained that the name originated from a phrase “Kulaman-su-wayeg”, which literally translates as “Kulaman in the water”. Kulaman is believed to have been a prominent sultan of the valley during the seventeenth century. According to local tradition, a severe famine once struck the area, prompting the sultan—regarded as a devoted provider—to venture out alone in search of food. He gathered cassava, a staple among the Manobo, to sustain his family.

Before returning home, he stopped to wash the root crops in a nearby river. However, a sudden and powerful current swept him away, carrying him downstream where he ultimately drowned. His body was later found and recovered downriver, coining the word “Kulaman-sa-ig” (Kulaman in the water).

The name evolved into “Kalamansig” which later become the official name. In honor of this Manobo tribal leader, the river where he was found was named after him and later, the entire upper valley was called “Kulaman”. This barangay is now part of Senator Ninoy Aquino.

== History ==
The existing seat of government of Kalamansig was formerly the municipality of Lebak. The first attempt to separate was on Lebak (presently Kalamansig) was under the municipal district of Kiamba while Salaman (now Lebak) use under the district of Dinaig on August 18, 1947, under Executive Order No. 82. and it was again reunited under one independent municipality of Lebak on December 31, 1948. The seat of government was transferred to Salaman on April 12, 1951.

Ten years later, the Municipality of Kalamansig formally created by the virtue of Executive Order No. 459 dated December 29, 1961 signed by Carlos P. Garcia, creating the municipality of Kalamansig from certain barangays of Lebak and Palimbang.

There are 20 barangays and sitios carved out from Lebak:

- Lun,
- Pitas,
- Dansalan,
- Pedtegenan,
- Madu,
- Port Lebak,
- Lenek,
- Santa Clara,
- Sebayor,
- Nalilidan,
- Bosawon,
- Calubcub,
- Camp III,
- Poral,
- Limulan,
- Simsiman,
- Cadiz,
- Tipudos.

The 8 barangays and sitios were taken from Palimbang are Sangay, Mat, Danawan, Paril, Babancao, Basiawan, Narra and North Kulaman.

Kalamansig was transferred from Cotabato province to province of Sultan Kudarat on November 22, 1973, by Presidential Decree No. 341 by President Ferdinand Marcos. Kalamansig lies the few miles from the epicenter of the devastating 1976 Moro Gulf earthquake. On February 17, 1989, barangays Buenaflores, Bugso, Kiadsam, Kadi, Kulaman, Malegdeg and Sewod were excised from Kalamansig to become part of the new municipality of Senator Ninoy Aquino, by virtue of Republic Act No. 6712.

In 2004, gigantic shipworms were discovered by the locals within the municipal waters. In 2017, the shipworms were formally researched on by local and international scientists. The research confirmed that the giant Kalamansig tamilok is kuphus polythalamia and is the largest species of its kind in the world. Due to the research, Kamalansig became the first and only known permanent natural habitat of the endangered species.

== Geography ==
Kalamansig is a coastal municipality located to west of Sultan Kudarat. Limulan River is the longest river in Kalamansig with a total length of 27 kilometers (17 mi).

=== Barangays ===
Kalamansig is politically subdivided into 15 barangays. Each barangay consists of puroks while some have sitios.

- Bantogon (Sta. Clara)
- Cadiz
- Datu Ito Andong
- Datu Wasay
- Dumangas Nuevo
- Hinalaan
- Limulan
- Nalilidan
- Obial
- Pag-asa
- Paril
- Poblacion
- Sabanal
- Sangay
- Santa Maria

=== Climate ===
Climate data for Kalamansig, Sultan Kudarat
Month	Jan	Feb	Mar	Apr	May	Jun	Jul	Aug	Sep	Oct	Nov	Dec	Year
Mean daily maximum °C (°F)	31 (88)	31 (88)	32 (90)	31 (88)	30 (86)	29 (84)	29 (84)	29 (84)	30 (86)	30 (86)	30 (86)	31 (88)	30 (87)
Mean daily minimum °C (°F)	23 (73)	23 (73)	23 (73)	24 (75)	25 (77)	25 (77)	24 (75)	24 (75)	24 (75)	24 (75)	24 (75)	24 (75)	24 (75)
Average precipitation mm (inches)	119 (4.7)	99 (3.9)	132 (5.2)	147 (5.8)	256 (10.1)	291 (11.5)	287 (11.3)	286 (11.3)	228 (9.0)	227 (8.9)	208 (8.2)	135 (5.3)	2,415 (95.2)
Average rainy days	19.2	17.9	20.9	24.6	29.4	29.1	29.7	28.9	27.2	28.5	27.2	22.5	305.1
Source: Meteoblue

== Demographics ==
Population census of Kalamansig
Year	Pop.	±% p.a.
1970	15,875	—
1975	21,740	+6.51%
1980	24,174	+2.14%
1990	30,779	+2.45%
1995	35,900	+2.93%
2000	44,645	+4.78%
2007	45,263	+0.19%
2010	46,408	+0.91%
2015	49,059	+1.06%
2020	50,900	+0.78%
2024	52,257	+0.63%
Source: Philippine Statistics Authority

== Economy ==
Poverty incidence of Kalamansig (%)

Source: Philippine Statistics Authority

== Education ==
=== Elementary ===
- Datu Guiabar Pilot School/DGPS (Barangay Poblacion), Kalamansig District I
- Ricardo Cabaluna Memorial Elementary School/ RCMES (Barangay Sangay), Kalamansig District II
- R.D. Talapian Sr. Memorial Elementary School/ RDTSMES (Barangay Paril), Kalamansig District II
- Teresita Patalinjug Elementary School/TPES (Barangay Cadiz), Kalamansig District I
- Artemio L. Martin Elementary School/ALMES (Barangay Obial), Kalamansig District I
- Santa Clara Central Elementary School/ SCES (Barangay Santa Clara), Kalamansig District II
- Nalilidan Elementary School/NES (Barangay Nalilidan), Kalamansig District II
- Don Modesto S. Buenaflor Sr. Elementary School (Barangay Dumangas Nuevo), Kalamansig District I
- Santa Maria Elementary School (Barangay Sta Maria), Kalamansig District I
- Pag-asa Elementary School/PES (Barangay Pag-Asa), Kalamansig District II
- Datu Etang Integrated School School/DEPS (Sitio Meles, Barangay Hinalaan), Kalamansig District II
- Datu Wasay Elementary School/DWES (Sitio Proper, Barangay Datu Wasay), Kalamansig District II
- Saint Andrew's Mission School-/SAMS (Sitio Tinandoc, Barangay Datu Wasay), Kalamansig District II
- Costa Rica Elementary School (Costa Rica, Barangay Datu Wasay), Kalamansig District II
- Limulan Elementary School LES (Barangay Limulan), Kalamansig District II
- F.B. Concha Primary School/FBCPS (Barangay Limulan), Kalamansig District II
- Datu Ito Andong Memorial Elementary School/DIAMES (Barangay Datu Ito Andong), Kalamansig District II
- Ma-at Primary School /MPS (Sitio Ma-at, Barangay Sangay), Kalamansig District II

=== High school ===
- Kalamansig National High School-Main (Barangay Poblacion)
- Kalamansig National High School-Datu Wasay HS (Barangay Datu Wasay)
- Kalamansig National High School-Sabanal HS (Barangay Sabanal)
- Santa Clara National High School-(Barangay Santa Clara)
- Sangay National High School (Barangay Sangay)
- Notre Dame of Kalamansig (Barangay Poblacion)

=== Integrated School ===
- Datu Etang Integrated School
- Private School integrated school

=== University/College ===
- Sultan Kudarat State University - Kalamansig Campus
