= Palimbang =

Municipality in Sultan Kudarat, Philippines

Palimbang Biwang (Coastal West)
- Municipality
- Municipality of Palimbang

Other transcription(s)
  - Jawi: ڤليمبڠ
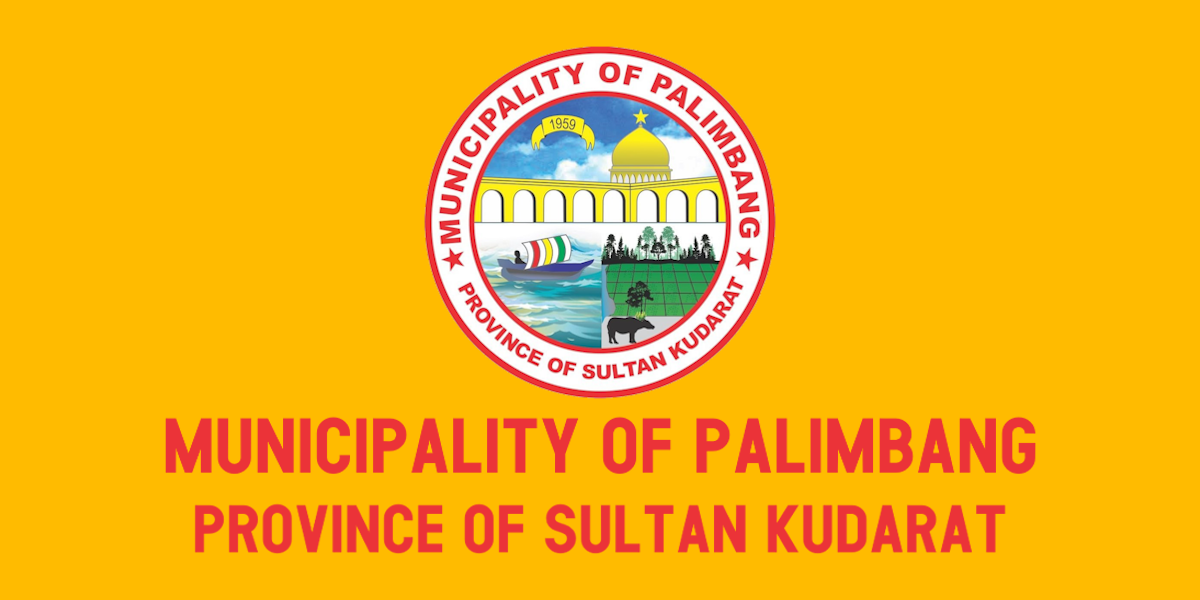
- Flag Seal
- Motto: Pat a Inged sa Biwang (Four communities in the Coastal West)
- Anthem: Palimbang hymm official
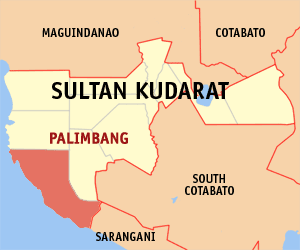
- Map of Sultan Kudarat with Palimbang highlighted
- Interactive map of Palimbang
- Location within the Philippines
- Coordinates: 6°13′N 124°12′E
- Country: Philippines
- Region: Soccsksargen
- Province: Sultan Kudarat
- District: 2nd district
- Founded: August 14, 1959
- Named for: Palembang, Indonesia
- Barangays: 40 (see Barangays)

Government
  - Type: Sangguniang Bayan
  - Mayor: Joenime Badrudin Kapina
  - Vice Mayor: Mosaban Pangansayan Aliding
  - Representative: Horacio P. Suansing, Jr.
  - Municipal Council: Members: Baisa D. Sinsuat-Sapal; Mhark M. Siokon; Zakiya A. Sabiwang; Janifa G. Pangansayan; Sucuny A. Pendatun; Abubakar M. Abdullah; Zakiya A. Sabiwang; Akmad D. Tausing
  - Electorate: 43,340 voters (2025)

Area
  - Total: 484.85 km^{2} (187.20 sq mi)
- Elevation: 27 m (89 ft)
- Highest elevation: 497 m (1,631 ft)
- Lowest elevation: 0 m (0 ft)

Population (2024 census)
  - Total: 83,633
  - Density: 172.49/km^{2} (446.75/sq mi)
  - Households: 19,591

Economy
  - Income class: 1st municipal income class
  - Poverty incidence: 43.99% (2023)
  - Revenue: ₱ 391.9 million (2024)
  - Assets: ₱ 613.1 million (2024)
  - Expenditure: ₱ 367.9 million (2024)
  - Liabilities: ₱ 123.2 million (2024)

Service provider
  - Electricity: Sultan Kudarat Electric Cooperative (SUKELCO)
- Time zone: UTC+8 (PST)
- ZIP code: 9809
- PSGC: 1206509000
- IDD : area code: +63 (0)64
- Native languages: Hiligaynon; Maguindanao; Cotabato Manobo; Tagalog

Palimbang, officially the Municipality of Palimbang (Hiligaynon: Banwa sang Palimbang; Tagalog: Bayan ng Palimbang; Maguindanaon: Inged nu Palimbang, Jawi: ايڠايد نو ڤليمبڠ), is a municipality in the province of Sultan Kudarat, Philippines. According to the 2024 census, it has a population of 83,633 people.

It was incorporated on August 14, 1959, through Executive Order No. 350 by President Carlos P. Garcia.

Their annual feast named Kalilang sa Biwang is celebrated every 11 November.

== History ==
Palimbang was organized into a municipality through Executive Order No. 350, issued by President Carlos P. Garcia on August 14, 1959. It consists of forty-six barrios of Lebak and Kiamba, both then part of the old Cotabato province. Upon the division of the province in 1973 through Ferdinand Marcos' Presidential Decree No. 341, the municipality became part of newly-created province of Sultan Kudarat.

=== Malisbong massacre ===
The Malisbong Masjid massacre, also called the Palimbang massacre, was the mass murder of Moros on September 24, 1974, in the coastal village of Malisbong in Palimbang, where units of Gov. Siongco and the Philippine Army killed more than 1,000. Accounts compiled by the Moro Women's Center in General Santos state that 1,500 male Moros aged 11–70 were killed inside a mosque, 3,000 women and children aged 9–60 were detained - with the women being raped and that 300 houses were razed by the government forces. The massacre occurred two years after Ferdinand Marcos declared martial law in September 1972.

The massacre started after the first four days on the feast of Ramadan when members of the Philippine Constabulary arrived and captured barangay officials along with 1,000 other Muslims and never came back. For more than a month, the military would capture murder residents in the area by batch. Testimonies show that victims were made to strip of their clothes, dig their own graves and shot.

== Geography ==
=== Barangays ===
Palimbang is politically subdivided into 40 barangays. Each barangay consists of puroks while some have sitios.

- Akol
- Badiangon
- Baliango
- Baluan (Bulan)
- Bambanen
- Baranayan
- Barongis
- Batang-baglas
- Butril
- Colube (Tagadtal)
- Datu Maguiales (Likuban)
- Dumolol
- Kabuling
- Kalibuhan
- Kanipaan (converged with Sinangkangan)
- Kidayan
- Kiponget
- Kisek
- Kraan
- Kolong-kolong
- Langali
- Libua
- Ligao
- Lopoken (Lepolon)
- Lumitan
- Maganao
- Maguid
- Malatunol
- Malisbong
- Medol
- Milbuk
- Mina
- Molon
- Namat (Namat Masla & Namat Padido converged)
- Napnapon
- Poblacion
- San Roque (Former Tibulos)
- Tibuhol (East Badiangon)
- Wal
- Wasag

=== Climate ===
Climate data for Palimbang, Sultan Kudarat
Month	Jan	Feb	Mar	Apr	May	Jun	Jul	Aug	Sep	Oct	Nov	Dec	Year
Mean daily maximum °C (°F)	30 (86)	30 (86)	31 (88)	31 (88)	30 (86)	29 (84)	29 (84)	29 (84)	30 (86)	29 (84)	29 (84)	30 (86)	30 (86)
Mean daily minimum °C (°F)	24 (75)	24 (75)	25 (77)	25 (77)	25 (77)	25 (77)	25 (77)	24 (75)	25 (77)	25 (77)	25 (77)	25 (77)	25 (77)
Average precipitation mm (inches)	285 (11.2)	265 (10.4)	303 (11.9)	300 (11.8)	380 (15.0)	386 (15.2)	332 (13.1)	305 (12.0)	252 (9.9)	305 (12.0)	355 (14.0)	325 (12.8)	3,793 (149.3)
Average rainy days	27.0	24.9	28.1	28.3	29.5	28.5	27.7	26.5	25.1	28.0	28.7	28.5	330.8
Source: Meteoblue

== Demographics ==
Population census of Palimbang
Year	Pop.	±% p.a.
1948	4,717	—
1960	19,128	+12.37%
1970	31,696	+5.17%
1975	21,113	−7.83%
1980	24,252	+2.81%
1990	33,821	+3.38%
1995	40,646	+3.50%
2000	43,742	+1.59%
2007	78,523	+8.40%
2010	83,265	+2.16%
2015	90,424	+1.58%
2020	92,828	+0.55%
2024	83,633	−2.47%
Source: Philippine Statistics Authority

== Economy ==
Poverty incidence of Palimbang (%)

Source: Philippine Statistics Authority

== Government ==
List of mayors of Palimbang
Name	Year in office	Notes
Datu Guiwan Mastura	1959–1967	Deputy governor at-large; appointed 1959, elected in 1963
Datu Druz Ali	1967–1986	
Mocsin Manondong	1986–1987	Appointed officer-in-charge, later ran for Sultan Kudarat Provincial Board
Dimalub Namil	1987–1988	Officer-in-charge
Labualas B. Mamansual	1988–1998	
Karim Daud	1998–2001	
Abubacar P. Maulana	2010–2018	
Labualas B. Mamansual	2001-2010	
Haron B. Sabiwang	January 2018 – 2019	Acting
Joenime B. Kapina	2019–present	
