= Bagumbayan, Sultan Kudarat =

Municipality in Sultan Kudarat, Philippines

Bagumbayan
- Municipality
- Municipality of Bagumbayan
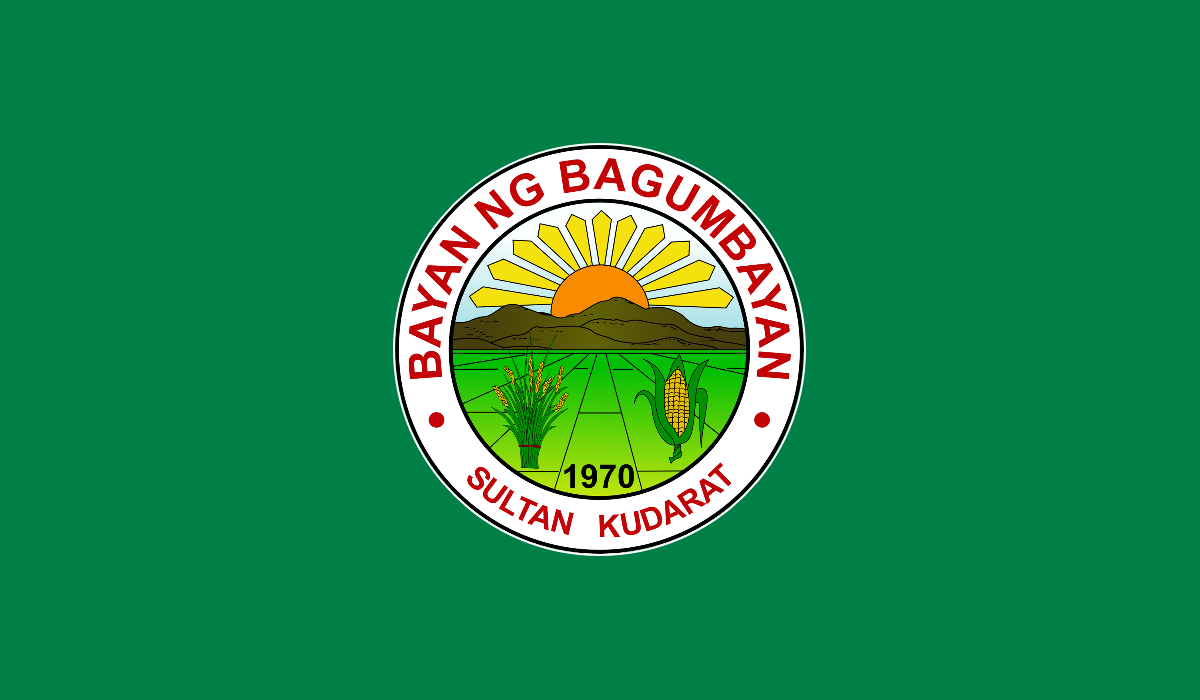
- Flag Seal

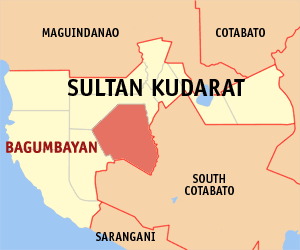
- Map of Sultan Kudarat with Bagumbayan highlighted
- Interactive map of Bagumbayan
- Location within the Philippines
- Coordinates: 6°32′02″N 124°33′48″E
- Country: Philippines
- Region: Soccsksargen
- Province: Sultan Kudarat
- District: 2nd district
- Barangays: 19 (see Barangays)

Government
  - Type: Sangguniang Bayan
  - Mayor: Jonalette E. De Pedro
  - Vice Mayor: Ernesto M. Segura Sr.
  - Representative: Horacio P. Suansing Jr.
  - Municipal Council: Members: Leonardo R. Caspe; Amil B. Nor Jr.; Elizer D. Segura; Richie U. Salazar; Vilma H. Bobon; Noel F. Fuentes; Justino A. Catiwalaan; Glenn B. Insular
  - Electorate: 45,803 voters (2025)

Area
  - Total: 672.06 km^{2} (259.48 sq mi)
- Elevation: 178 m (584 ft)
- Highest elevation: 987 m (3,238 ft)
- Lowest elevation: 73 m (240 ft)

Population (2024 census)
  - Total: 69,830
  - Density: 103.9/km^{2} (269.1/sq mi)
  - Households: 16,893

Economy
  - Income class: 1st municipal income class
  - Poverty incidence: 28.71% (2023)
  - Revenue: ₱ 387.8 million (2024)
  - Assets: ₱ 682.6 million (2024)
  - Expenditure: ₱ 369.5 million (2024)
  - Liabilities: ₱ 128.6 million (2024)

Service provider
  - Electricity: Sultan Kudarat Electric Cooperative (SUKELCO)
- Time zone: UTC+8 (PST)
- ZIP code: 9810
- PSGC: 1206501000
- IDD : area code: +63 (0)64
- Native languages: Hiligaynon; Maguindanao; Tboli; Tagalog
- Website: www.bagumbayan.gov.ph

Bagumbayan, officially the Municipality of Bagumbayan (Hiligaynon: Banwa sang Bagumbayan; Maguindanaon: Inged nu Bagumbayan, Jawi: ايڠد نو باڬومباين; Tagalog: Bayan ng Bagumbayan), is a municipality in the province of Sultan Kudarat, Philippines. According to the 2024 census, it has a population of 69,830 people.

== History ==
The municipality of Bagumbayan was transferred from the dissolved province of Cotabato to the province of Sultan Kudarat on November 22, 1973, by virtue of Presidential Decree No. 341 signed by President Ferdinand E. Marcos. On February 17, 1989, barangay Langgal was separated from Bagumbayan to become part of the newly established municipality of Senator Ninoy Aquino by virtue of Republic Act No. 6712.

== Geography ==
=== Barangays ===
Bagumbayan is politically subdivided into 19 barangays. Each barangay consists of puroks while some have sitios.

- Bai Saripinang
- Biwang
- Busok
- Chua
- Daguma(Mt.Daguma Gunting)
- Daluga
- Kabulanan
- Kanulay
- Kapaya
- Kinayao
- Masiag
- Monteverde
- Poblacion
- Santo Niño
- Sison
- South Sepaka (Shariff Galmak)
- Sumilil
- Titulok
- Tuka

=== Climate ===
Climate data for Bagumbayan, Sultan Kudarat
Month	Jan	Feb	Mar	Apr	May	Jun	Jul	Aug	Sep	Oct	Nov	Dec	Year
Mean daily maximum °C (°F)	31 (88)	31 (88)	32 (90)	32 (90)	31 (88)	30 (86)	29 (84)	30 (86)	30 (86)	30 (86)	30 (86)	31 (88)	31 (87)
Mean daily minimum °C (°F)	23 (73)	23 (73)	23 (73)	24 (75)	24 (75)	24 (75)	24 (75)	24 (75)	24 (75)	24 (75)	24 (75)	23 (73)	24 (74)
Average precipitation mm (inches)	64 (2.5)	45 (1.8)	59 (2.3)	71 (2.8)	140 (5.5)	179 (7.0)	192 (7.6)	198 (7.8)	163 (6.4)	147 (5.8)	113 (4.4)	66 (2.6)	1,437 (56.5)
Average rainy days	12.2	10.3	12.7	15.7	26.0	27.4	28.1	28.2	26.0	26.7	22.9	16.6	252.8
Source: Meteoblue

== Demographics ==
Population census of Bagumbayan
Year	Pop.	±% p.a.
1970	26,231	—
1975	19,083	−6.18%
1980	26,855	+7.07%
1990	36,524	+3.12%
1995	45,584	+4.24%
2000	53,444	+3.47%
2007	57,133	+0.92%
2010	63,700	+4.04%
2015	67,061	+0.98%
2020	68,947	+0.59%
2024	69,830	+0.31%
Source: Philippine Statistics Authority

== Economy ==
Poverty incidence of Bagumbayan

Source: Philippine Statistics Authority

Bagumbayan, known for its gold and copper deposits, has emerged as a growing source of export-quality banana and pineapple in Central Mindanao. Companies such as Super Green Agricultural Developers Corp. (Sugadco) and SUMIFRU Inc. developed 256 hectares (630 acres) of banana and pineapple plantations in Barangay Kinayao, Bagumbayan town, starting May, 2008. 5 other barangays in the town will later be developed for banana, namely: Bai Saripinang, Daguma, Kapaya, Tuka, Poblacion and Busok.
