= Senator Ninoy Aquino, Sultan Kudarat =

Municipality in Sultan Kudarat, Philippines

Senator Ninoy Aquino Kulaman
- Municipality
- Municipality of Senator Ninoy Aquino
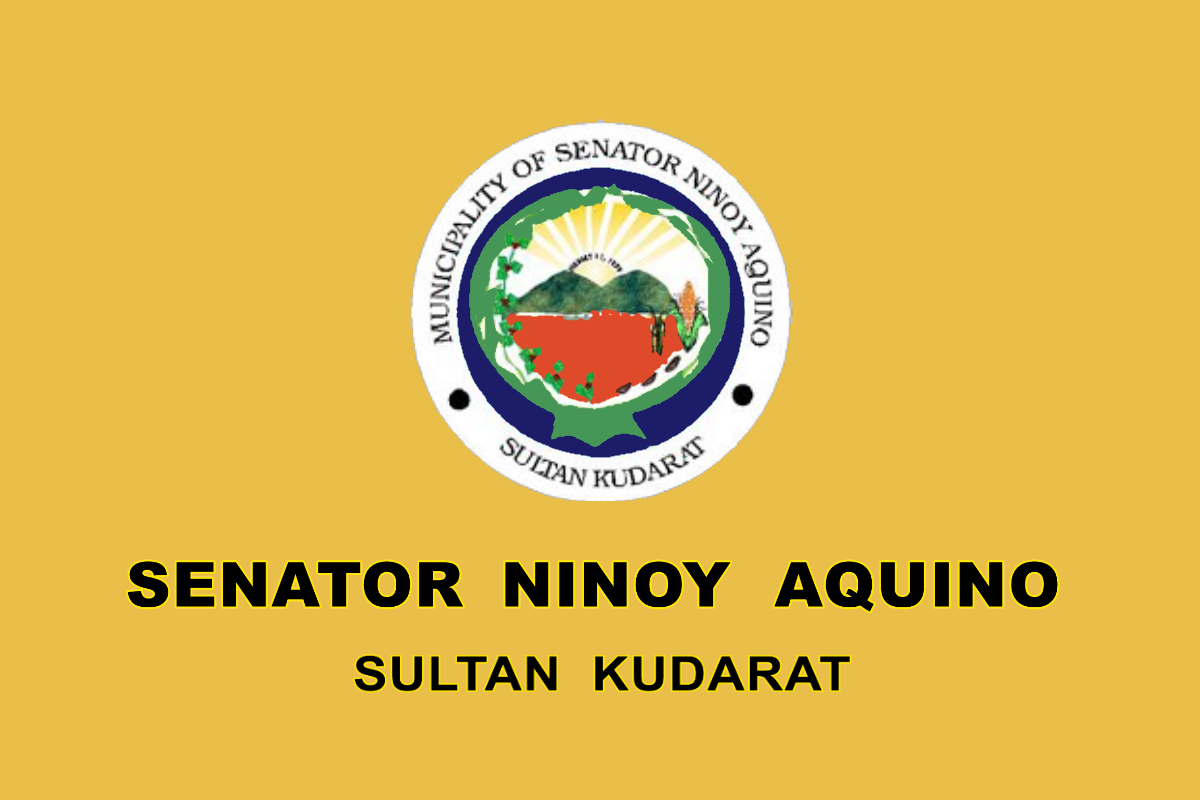
- Flag Seal

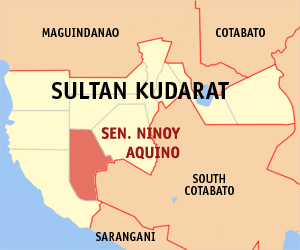
- Map of Sultan Kudarat with Senator Ninoy Aquino highlighted
- Interactive map of Senator Ninoy Aquino
- Location within the Philippines
- Coordinates: 6°27′51″N 124°19′18″E
- Country: Philippines
- Region: Soccsksargen
- Province: Sultan Kudarat
- District: 2nd district
- Founded: February 17, 1989
- Named for: Benigno "Ninoy" Aquino Jr.
- Barangays: 20 (see Barangays)

Government
  - Type: Sangguniang Bayan
  - Mayor: Rafael George L. Flauta III
  - Vice Mayor: Ricardo D. Bajade
  - Representative: Bella Vanessa B. Suansing
  - Municipal Council: Members: Ricardo D. Bajade; Gregorio C. Navos Jr.; Lucrecia C. Ordinario; Romeo S. Galgo Sr.; Jay G. Baylon; Marlon C. Difuntorum; Jay Gilhoyd V. Sabio; June Frances H. Defante
  - Electorate: 31,183 voters (2025)

Area
  - Total: 320.00 km^{2} (123.55 sq mi)
- Elevation: 771 m (2,530 ft)
- Highest elevation: 1,172 m (3,845 ft)
- Lowest elevation: 630 m (2,070 ft)

Population (2024 census)
  - Total: 48,003
  - Density: 150.01/km^{2} (388.52/sq mi)
  - Households: 13,081

Economy
  - Income class: 1st municipal income class
  - Poverty incidence: 31.14% (2023)
  - Revenue: ₱ 233.9 million (2024)
  - Assets: ₱ 282.8 million (2024)
  - Expenditure: ₱ 194.4 million (2024)
  - Liabilities: ₱ 135.4 million (2024)

Service provider
  - Electricity: Sultan Kudarat Electric Cooperative (SUKELCO)
- Time zone: UTC+8 (PST)
- ZIP code: 9811
- PSGC: 1206512000
- IDD : area code: +63 (0)64
- Native languages: Hiligaynon; Maguindanao; Cotabato Manobo; Tagalog

Senator Ninoy Aquino, officially the Municipality of Senator Ninoy Aquino (abbreviated as SNA; Hiligaynon: Banwa sang Senator Ninoy Aquino; Tagalog: Bayan ng Senador Ninoy Aquino; Ilocano: Ili ti Senator Ninoy Aquino; Maguindanaon: Inged nu Senator Ninuy Akinu, Jawi: ايڠايد نو سناتور نينوي اكينو), is a municipality in the province of Sultan Kudarat, Philippines. According to the 2024 census, it has a population of 48,003 people.

== History ==
Senator Ninoy Aquino was established on February 17, 1989, through Republic Act No. 6712. The municipality is named after former senator Benigno "Ninoy" Aquino Jr., who was assassinated in 1983.

The creation of the municipality involved transferring several barangays from neighboring municipalities: Buenaflores, Bugso, Kiadsam, Kadi, Kulaman, Malegdeg and Sewod from the municipality of Kalamansig and Langgal from the municipality of Bagumbayan to form the new municipality. The seat of government of the municipality is designated at Barangay Kulaman.

== Geography ==
=== Barangays ===
Senator Ninoy Aquino is politically subdivided into 20 barangays. Each barangay consists of puroks while some have sitios.

- Banali
- Basag
- Buenaflores
- Bugso
- Buklod
- Gapok
- Kadi
- Kapatagan
- Kiadsam
- Kuden
- Kulaman
- Lagubang
- Langgal
- Limuhay
- Malegdeg
- Midtungok
- Nati
- Sewod
- Tacupis
- Tinalon

=== Climate ===
Climate data for Senator Ninoy Aquino, Sultan Kudarat
Month	Jan	Feb	Mar	Apr	May	Jun	Jul	Aug	Sep	Oct	Nov	Dec	Year
Mean daily maximum °C (°F)	26 (79)	26 (79)	26 (79)	26 (79)	26 (79)	26 (79)	25 (77)	25 (77)	25 (77)	25 (77)	25 (77)	26 (79)	26 (78)
Mean daily minimum °C (°F)	20 (68)	20 (68)	20 (68)	21 (70)	21 (70)	21 (70)	21 (70)	20 (68)	20 (68)	20 (68)	21 (70)	20 (68)	20 (69)
Average precipitation mm (inches)	285 (11.2)	265 (10.4)	303 (11.9)	300 (11.8)	380 (15.0)	386 (15.2)	332 (13.1)	305 (12.0)	252 (9.9)	305 (12.0)	355 (14.0)	325 (12.8)	3,793 (149.3)
Average rainy days	27.0	24.9	28.1	28.3	29.5	28.5	27.7	26.5	25.1	28.0	28.7	28.5	330.8
Source: Meteoblue

== Demographics ==
Population census of Senator Ninoy Aquino
Year	Pop.	±% p.a.
1990	20,879	—
1995	28,768	+6.19%
2000	30,222	+1.06%
2007	35,168	+2.11%
2010	43,508	+8.05%
2015	46,882	+1.43%
2020	47,374	+0.22%
2024	48,003	+0.32%
Source: Philippine Statistics Authority

== Economy ==
Poverty incidence of Senator Ninoy Aquino (%)

Source: Philippine Statistics Authority
