= Sultan Kudarat's 2nd congressional district =

Legislative district of the Philippines

- Constituency for the House of Representatives of the Philippines
- Location of Sultan Kudarat within the Philippines
- Province: Sultan Kudarat
- Region: Soccsksargen
- Population: 408,389 (2015)
- Electorate: 220,540 (2019)
- Major settlements: 6 LGUs: Municipalities; Bagumbayan; Esperanza; Kalamansig; Lebak; Palimbang; Senator Ninoy Aquino
- Area: 2,971.26 km^{2} (1,147.21 sq mi)

Current constituency
- Created: 2006
- Representative: Bella Vanessa Suansing
- Political party: PFP
- Congressional bloc: Majority

Sultan Kudarat's 2nd congressional district is one of the two congressional districts of the Philippines in the province of Sultan Kudarat. It has been represented in the House of Representatives since 2007. It was created after the 2006 reapportionment that divided the province into two congressional districts. The district is composed of the coastal and western municipalities of Bagumbayan, Esperanza, Kalamansig, Lebak, Palimbang and Senator Ninoy Aquino. It is currently represented in the 20th Congress by Bella Vanessa B. Suansing of the Partido Federal ng Pilipinas (PFP).

== Representation history ==
#	Image	Member	Term of office		Congress	Party	Electoral history	Constituent LGUs
#	Image	Member	Start	End	Congress	Party	Electoral history	Constituent LGUs
=== Sultan Kudarat's 2nd district for the House of Representatives of the Philippines ===
District created October 2, 2006 from Sultan Kudarat's at-large district.
1		Arnulfo F. Go	June 30, 2007	June 30, 2016	14th	Lakas	Elected in 2007.	2007–present Bagumbayan, Esperanza, Kalamansig, Lebak, Palimbang, Senator Ninoy Aquino
1		Arnulfo F. Go	June 30, 2007	June 30, 2016	15th	NUP	Re-elected in 2010.	2007–present Bagumbayan, Esperanza, Kalamansig, Lebak, Palimbang, Senator Ninoy Aquino
1		Arnulfo F. Go	June 30, 2007	June 30, 2016	16th	NUP	Re-elected in 2013.	2007–present Bagumbayan, Esperanza, Kalamansig, Lebak, Palimbang, Senator Ninoy Aquino
2		Horacio P. Suansing Jr.	June 30, 2016	June 30, 2025	17th	PDP–Laban	Elected in 2016.	2007–present Bagumbayan, Esperanza, Kalamansig, Lebak, Palimbang, Senator Ninoy Aquino
2		Horacio P. Suansing Jr.	June 30, 2016	June 30, 2025	18th	NUP	Re-elected in 2019.	2007–present Bagumbayan, Esperanza, Kalamansig, Lebak, Palimbang, Senator Ninoy Aquino
2		Horacio P. Suansing Jr.	June 30, 2016	June 30, 2025	19th	NUP	Re-elected in 2022.	2007–present Bagumbayan, Esperanza, Kalamansig, Lebak, Palimbang, Senator Ninoy Aquino
3		Bella Vanessa B. Suansing	June 30, 2025	Incumbent	20th	PFP	Elected in 2025.	2007–present Bagumbayan, Esperanza, Kalamansig, Lebak, Palimbang, Senator Ninoy Aquino

== Election results ==
=== 2025 ===
Candidate	Party	Votes	%
Bella Suansing	Partido Federal ng Pilipinas	138,151	100.00
Total		138,151	100.00
Valid votes		138,151	71.15
Invalid/blank votes		56,006	28.85
Total votes		194,157	100.00
Registered voters/turnout		257,691	75.34
Partido Federal ng Pilipinas gain from National Unity Party			
Source: Commission on Elections

== See also ==
- Legislative districts of Sultan Kudarat
