= Battle of Lebak =

1973, Philippine government v. rebels

- Part of the Moro conflict
| Date | February 26, 1973 – August 14, 1973; 53 years ago |
| Location | Lebak, Cotabato, Philippines |
| Result | Philippine government victory |
| Territorial changes | Moro National Liberation Front is pushed out of Lebak. |

Belligerents
| Philippines: Armed Forces of the Philippines; Philippine Constabulary | Moro National Liberation Front |

Commanders and leaders
| Gen. Fortunato U. Abat; Lt. Gringo Honasan | Cmdr. Ali Sansaluna; Datu Guiwan Mastura (surrendered); Datu Sangki Karon |

Units involved
| Armed Forces of the Philippines: 27th Infantry Battalion; 3rd Infantry Army Brigade; 4th Infantry Battalion; 21st Infantry Battalion; 22nd Infantry Battalion; 1st Composite Infantry Battalion; Naval Task Group 71.1; Composite Air Support Force Cotabato; Philippine Constabulary: 54th Constabulary Battalion; 531st Constabulary Company; 554th Constabulary Company | MNLF Cotabato Command |

Strength
| 3,500-4,500 government troops 4 warships | 5,000-6,000 militants |

Casualties and losses
| Unknown | Unknown |

The Battle of Lebak, historically documented as Operation Lebak or the Battle of Tran, was a major battle between forces of the government of the Philippines and the Moro National Liberation Front in 1973. It took place in the town of Lebak, Cotabato, now currently belonging to Sultan Kudarat, with the hardest fighting taking place in Barangay Tran, in southern Philippines. It was one of the first battles of the Moro insurgency in Mindanao.

The Moros initially gained much of the town and much of Cotabato province, surrounding Cotabato City and Awang Airport in the process. Philippine government forces held the town center until reinforcements from other parts of the country arrived. An offensive by the Armed Forces of the Philippines was launched to retake the areas taken by the Moro insurgents, retaking the entirety of the town and resulting to the surrender of one of the Moro commanders. The battle would become one of the largest battles of the entire Moro conflict.

== Background ==
Lebak, then still a part of the Empire Province of Cotabato that was largely governed by Muslim Moro chieftains under American supervision, was founded as an incorporated municipality and town on August 18, 1947, by Christian settlers from Luzon and the Visayas who had been migrating from Mindanao since the beginning of the 1903 Homesteading Policy of the American colonial government. The Land Reform Code of President Diosdado Macapagal brought more Christian migrants from Luzon and Visayas to the area in the early 1960s. This resulted to the increasing disenfranchisement of the native Moro population and their eventual expulsion from their ancestral lands, becoming one of the roots that gave way to the Moro conflict. Further escalating the tension was the Jabidah massacre that killed Moro recruits in the Philippine Army in 1968, and the signing of Proclamation No. 1081 by President Ferdinand Marcos in 1972, beginning the Martial Law. Furthering the violence was the perceived government support on the Christian paramilitary organization Ilaga who have already been harassing and even killing native Moros in what is now Banisilan and Carmen that saw more Moros became ever more violent over what they see as an injustice on their own homeland.

To that end, the Moro National Liberation Front was founded by Nur Misuari and shortly became a formidable organization that managed to gather thousands of supporters and militants out of a people desperate to defend their ancestral lands from what they see as land grabbing sanctioned and legalized by what they see as a Christian-led Philippine government. The MNLF leadership had finally resolved to fight for the independence of Bangsamoro as a sovereign republic.

== Prelude ==
The MNLF leadership decided that if Bangsamoro is to gain independence from the Philippine Republic, it would have to be gained through force of arms. To that end, they went on to grow their organization and the number of fighting men under arms. It was then decided that the main offensive of the MNLF would have to encompass the entirety of the Empire Province of Cotabato, isolating large settlements then encircling them for the great assault, with the ultimate objective being Cotabato City which had been for a long time the capital of the Moro Sultanate of Maguindanao.

== Battle ==
Under the command of Rajah Buayan, Commander Ali “Cassius Clay” Sansaluna of Moro National Liberation Front Cotabato Command landed at barangay Tran in December 1972 with an estimated 5,000 – 6,000 insurgent militants armed with Western-made weapons ship from Muslim countries such as Malaysia, Indonesia and Libya. Barangay Tran was established as the main logistical base of the MNLF's Cotabato Command. The hostilities began on February 26, 1973, when a group of fishermen at Tran River was shot and killed by MNLF militants taking over the area. The following day, February 27, 1973, the 54 Philippine Constabulary confirmed that the skirmishes had begun within Lebak. Signalled the MNLF offensive all over Cotabato raided including Civilian Home Defense Forces (CHDFs), 27th Infantry Battalion, PC Provincial Commands and villages as far as barangay Basak.

22nd Infantry Battalion (Separate) was deployed at Lebak in April 1973.

Datu Guiwan Mastura withdraws from Lebak and Kalamansig and seeks sanctuary at Palimbang on March 21, 1973. Tran was guarded with 600 rebels under the command of Datu Sangki Karon.

Offensive military operation started June 6, 1973, under the command of Unified Central Mindanao Command (CEMCOM) Task Force COSMOS under General Fortunato U. Abat who was the commanding general of 3rd Inf Bde (Sep) PA. Units include 21st, the 22nd and the 4th Infantry Battalions PA, the 1st Composite Infantry Battalion, GHQ, the 554th and 531st Philippine Constabulary Companies and four ships of the Naval task Group 71.1, and Composite Air Support Force Cotabato.

July 21, 1973, government troops controlled the Barangay Tran and kept pushing towards Sitio Turugan. A thousand rebels together with their families surrendered to government troops on August 3, 1973. On August 4, 1972, the 22nd Infantry Battalion finally cleared the Sitio Turugan, the Moro National Liberation Front stronghold. The Tran Offensive officially ended on August 6, 1973, ending the two-month offensive that finally secured Lebak from the Moro militants.

== Aftermath ==
Leader of Tran insurgents Datu Guiwan Mastura together with 12 men surrendered to Ferdinand Marcos in June 1973. Lieutenant Gringo Honasan was one of the wounded of this battle and was later awarded with 3 Gold Cross Medal.

Despite the loss in the battle at Lebak, the insurgency of the Moro National Liberation Front continued all over Central Mindanao as they transitioned from battalion-level assaults to guerrilla warfare and hit-and-run attacks. Roughly a year after the battle by 1974 the group had grown into a formidable military organization fielding some 60,000 fighters all over Mindanao. The conflict had by then become so destructive within a few years with no resolution in sight that President Marcos had to come to terms with the MNLF leader Misuari with a compromise that the Muslim Moro areas of Mindanao will remain as Philippine territory in exchange for the Moros administering their own territory as an autonomous region. The Moro separatists under the MNLF including their later splinter group Moro Islamic Liberation Front finally had their request for an administrative region for them to administer on their own fulfilled albeit decades later and with some caveats, as while Lebak as well as majority of the former Empire province of Cotabato which later passed on to Soccsksargen never became part of any Moro-led political entity due to them having since been inhabited by descendants of Christian settlers from Luzon and Visayas, Bangsamoro did become an autonomous region encompassing the native Moro-inhabited areas of Mindanao including Maguindanao.
