= Lebak, Sultan Kudarat =

Municipality in Sultan Kudarat, Philippines

Lebak
- Municipality
- Municipality of Lebak

Other transcription(s)
  - Jawi: لبک
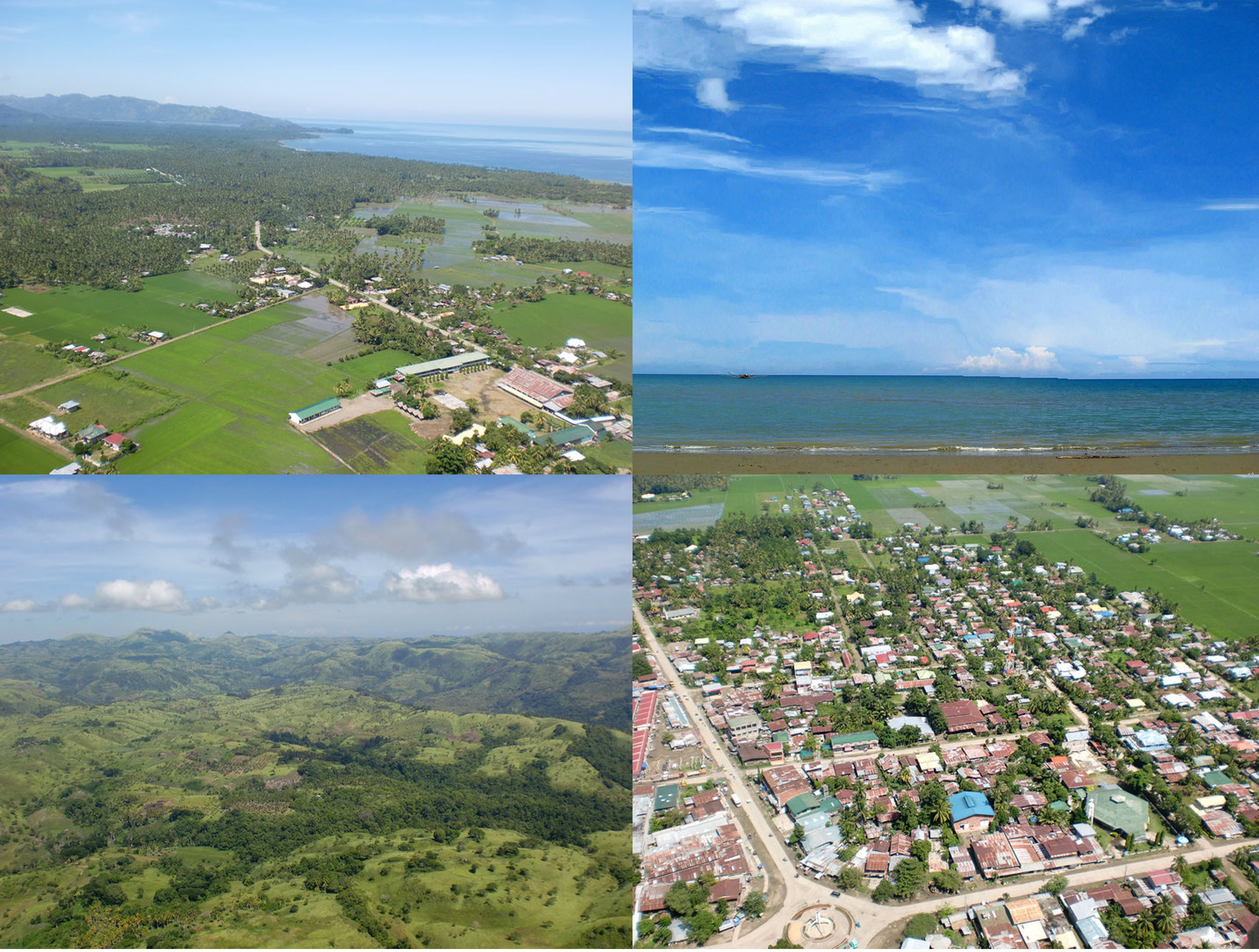
- Aerial view of Lebak

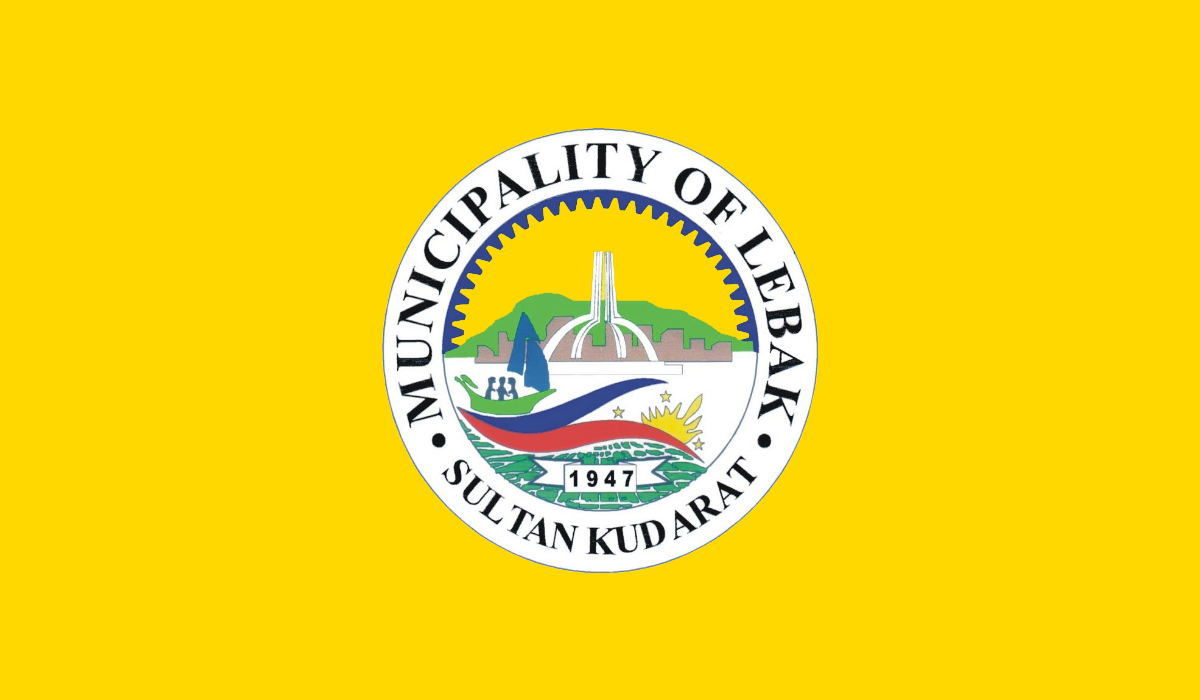
- Flag Seal
- Motto: Mapeon Lebak (Manobo) or Beautiful Lebak
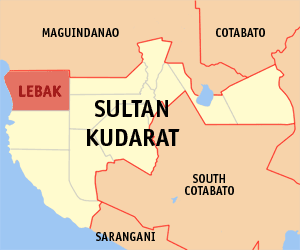
- Map of Sultan Kudarat with Lebak highlighted
- Interactive map of Lebak
- Location within the Philippines
- Coordinates: 6°38′N 124°04′E
- Country: Philippines
- Region: Soccsksargen
- Province: Sultan Kudarat
- District: 2nd district
- Founded: August 18, 1947
- Barangays: 27 (see Barangays)

Government
  - Type: Sangguniang Bayan
  - Mayor: Frederick F. Celestial
  - Vice Mayor: Nathaniel A. Castillon
  - Representative: Horacio P. Suansing Jr.
  - Municipal Council: Members: Melchor B. Alarcon; Juno Marteen S. Vegas; Rosalito G. delos Reyes; Randy R. Orgo; Jimmy B. Dumaguin Sr.; Eleuterio T. Otayde Jr.; Roberto A. Tacadao; Blesilda D. Torreña
  - Electorate: 59,106 voters (2025)

Area
  - Total: 470.86 km^{2} (181.80 sq mi)
- Elevation: 28 m (92 ft)
- Highest elevation: 473 m (1,552 ft)
  - Rank: 28
- Lowest elevation: −2 m (−6.6 ft)

Population (2024 census)
  - Total: 93,312
  - Density: 198.17/km^{2} (513.27/sq mi)
  - Households: 22,155

Economy
  - Income class: 1st municipal income class
  - Poverty incidence: 31.29% (2023)
  - Revenue: ₱ 413.1 million (2024)
  - Assets: ₱ 601.9 million (2024)
  - Expenditure: ₱ 376.2 million (2024)
  - Liabilities: ₱ 176.8 million (2024)

Service provider
  - Electricity: Sultan Kudarat Electric Cooperative (SUKELCO)
- Time zone: UTC+8 (PST)
- ZIP code: 9807
- PSGC: 1206506000
- IDD : area code: +63 (0)64
- Native languages: Hiligaynon; Maguindanao; Teduray; Tagalog
- Website: www.lebak.gov.ph

Lebak, officially the Municipality of Lebak (Hiligaynon: Banwa sang Lebak; Maguindanaon: Inged nu Lebak, Jawi: ايڠد نو لبک; Tagalog: Bayan ng Lebak), is a municipality in the province of Sultan Kudarat, Philippines. It lies on the northwestern coast of the province and has a population of 93,312 according to the 2024 census.

== Etymology ==
Lebak is a Maguindanaon word meaning hollow. This is attributed to the geography of Lebak, where the eastern portion is mountainous while the western side borders the Celebes Sea, creating a low-lying or hollow area between the mountains and the sea.

== History ==
Early settlers of the munipalicity were the Manobo at Salangsang. Anthropomorphic urn burials of limestone and some pottery were found in Seminoho Cave and they date back to AD 585. The Manobos' way of life was intact until the Teduray settlers arrived in the 1950s.

=== Sultanate era ===
Lebak was once part of Sultanate of Maguindanao. The arrival of Maguindanao which established the Islamic faith and settled in near the rivers and shores in the 15th century.

=== Spanish era ===
This territory was part of the Spanish Empire in Asia and Oceania (1520–1898). By 1696, Captain Rodríguez de Figueroa obtained from the Spanish government the exclusive right to colonize Mindanao. On February 1 of that same year, he reached the mouth of the Rio Grande of Mindanao, in what is now known as the city of Cotabato. After obtaining this exclusive right, Captain Rodríguez de Figueroa began an expedition to expand Spanish influence in the region. However, his efforts met strong resistance from local communities, including the Sultanate of Maguindanao and various indigenous groups. Despite this, Spanish influence continued to grow, particularly through the establishment of military posts and Catholic missions. Spanish rule in the interior of Mindanao remained unstable, with local resistance continuing throughout the colonial period.

The first written history of this town was in 1871, The colonial government of Spain, Lebac was made into a military district of Cotabato. The military campaign of Emilio Terrero y Perinat against Sultan reaches Lebak in 1887.

=== American period ===
By the end of the Spanish regime in 1898, includes politico-military comendancia of Lebak in "Fifth District of Mindanao". The town already producing rice during the period of 1905 and vinta was already in service from Cotabato to Lebac. In 1913 Under the United States ended the military rule in Mindanao and establish the Department of Mindanao and Sulu. Act No. 2711 of the Philippine Commission dated March 10, 1917, Lebak and Salaman was incorporated into Province of Cotabato. The growing agrarian problem in Luzon and Visayas offers United States government offers the solution of homestead and resettlement in Mindanao particularly in Lebak. Act 2408 enacted on July 23, 1914, Lebak was part of Empire Province of Cotabato. Between the time between 1914 and 1937 a steady flow of Christian settlers from Luzon (Ilocanos) and Visayas (Ilongos).

=== World War II and Japanese occupation ===
In 1945, World War II when the combined American and Filipino forces took over the supervision of the Philippine Government against Japanese occupation, Marcelino A. Concha was still the Military Governor of the Empire Province of Cotabato. In the same year, Aurelio Freires, Sr. was appointed Municipal District Mayor of Salaman.

=== Post colonial (third republic) and creation of Lebak ===
On August 18, 1947, President Manuel Roxas sign an executive order 82 organizing municipalities and municipal district of Cotabato Province. The municipal district of Lebak was formally created under the municipal district of Kiamba under section 4, however, on same executive order on section 10 the municipal district of Salaman was under the Municipality of Dinaig. Together with the Kalamansig, Salaman was formerly a part of the municipality of once called Lebak and the seat of government is in now called Kalamansig Municipal Hall.

An executive order number 195, the Municipality of Lebak as separated from the municipality of district of Kiamba and Dinaig and upholding the seat of government at Sito Kalamansig was signed by President Elpidio Quirino on December 31, 1948. and on April 12, 1951, and an executive order 432 issued to transfer the seat of government from Kalamansig to Barrio of Salaman.

On April 12, 1951, the municipality of Kalamansig is formally created consisting of 20 barrios and sitios from Lebak.

=== Moro conflict ===
The Land Reform Code of Diosdado Macapagal brought more Christian migrants from Luzon and Visayas.

Lebak became the site of one of the earliest and one of the largest battles of the Moro conflict, the Battle of Lebak also known as Battle of Tran named after one of its barangays where fighting was the hardest. By late 1972 Barangay Tran became the logistical base of the Moro National Liberation Front in then-Cotabato province. Philippine government troops came to drive the Moro insurgents out and resulted to the surrender of roughly 600 militants in Barangay Tran, declaring the battle over by August 14, 1973.

=== Post war and 1976 tsunami disaster ===
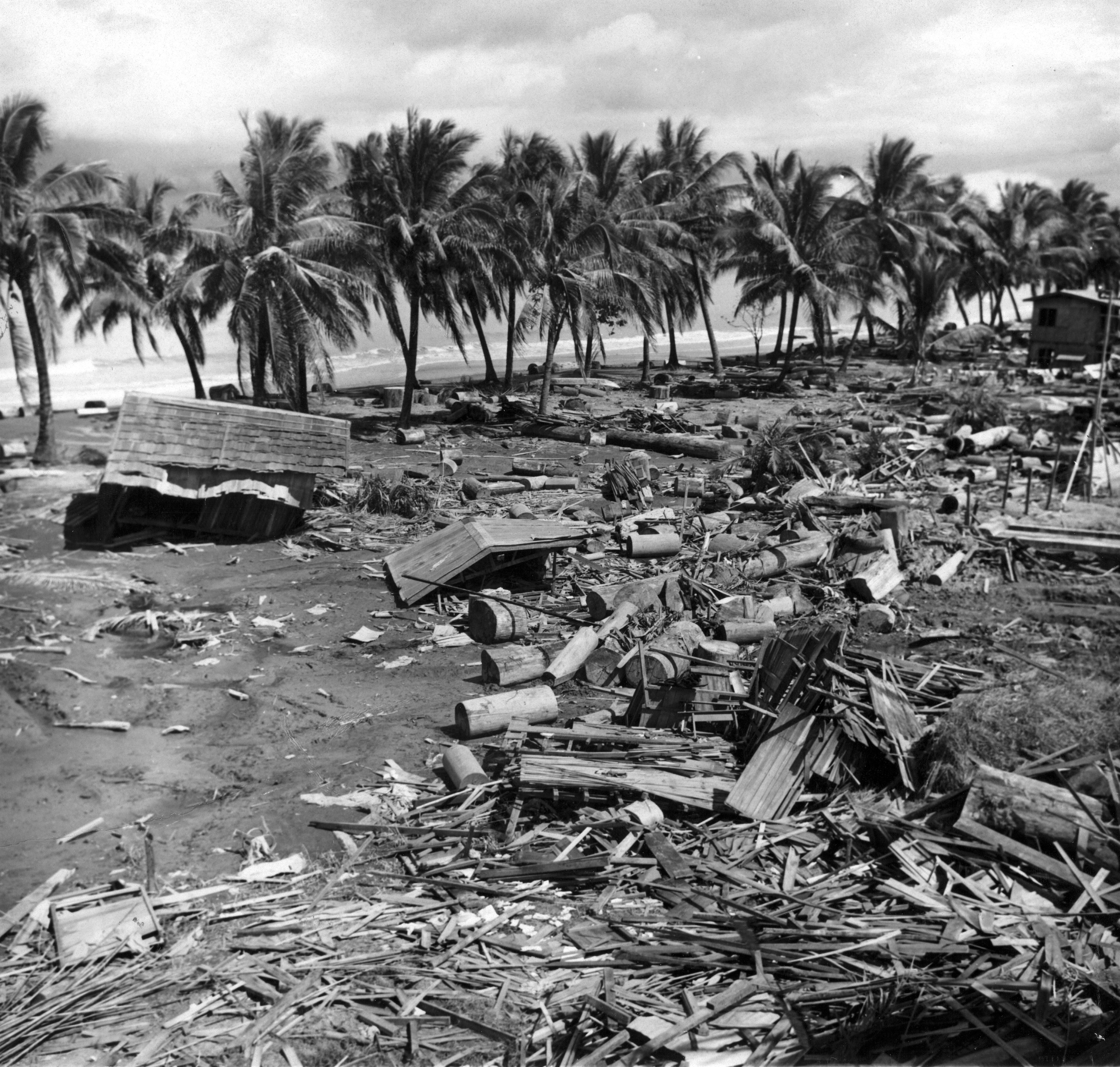
Homes destroyed in Barangay Tibpuan, Lebak, by the 1976 tsunami

The 8.0 (Mw) earthquake on August 16, 1976 at 16:11 UTC (12:11 AM local time) occurred near the Moro Gulf at a depth of 33 kilometres (21 mi), about 40.7 kilometres (25.3 mi) south of the populated barangay of Tibpuan. It was followed by 15 aftershocks. The quake triggered a 9-meter tsunami that killed an estimated 8,000 people in the affected region.

A few years later, the municipality of Lebak was transferred from Cotabato Province to Province of Sultan Kudarat on November 22, 1979, by presidential decree 341 by President Ferdinand E. Marcos.

=== Fifth republic ===
The municipality was formerly composed of 23 barangays and created 4 new barangays, Bolebak, Barurao II, Poblacion II and Poblacion III making it to 27 barangays.

The renaming of Poblacion 2 to barangay Aurelio F. Frieres Sr was approved by the Sanguniang Bayan in its resolution number 007 series of 2002. A plebiscite was enacted last March 31, 2005.

== Geography ==
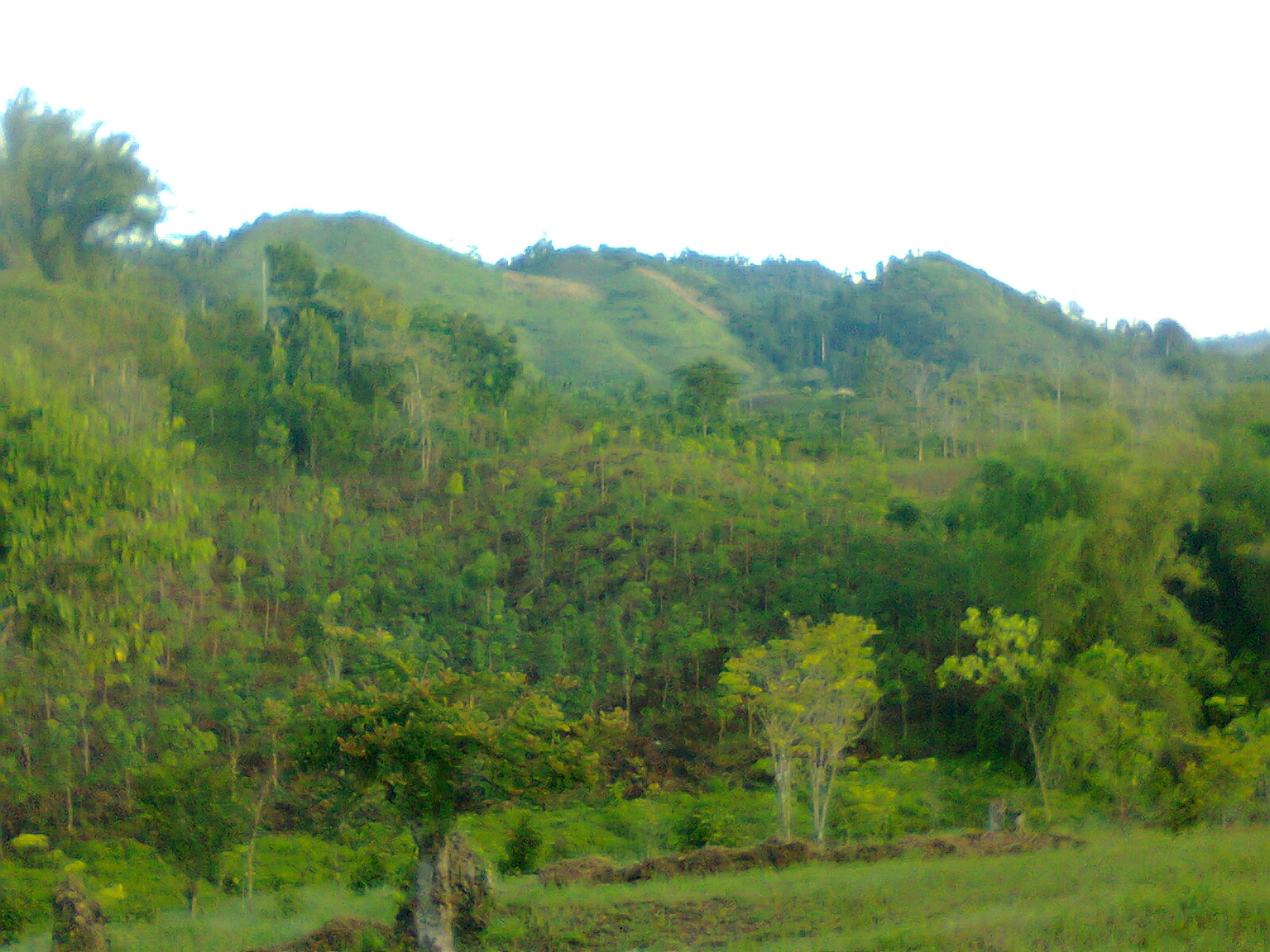
Slope aspect and elevation

Lebak is a coastal town with a total coastline of 19 km (12 mi) long, separated from the mainland of Sultan Kudarat by mountain ranges. It is located on the western portion of the Province of Sultan kudarat, and bordered in the north by South Upi, Maguindanao del Sur; in the south by Kalamansig; in the west by Celebes Sea; in the east by Esperanza.

Lebak is marked with hilly, mountainous ranges. It is about eight feet above sea level. The plains range from level to nearly level while uplands range from nearly level to hilly. Mountainous and gently rolling slopes are suitable for intensive rice and corn farming.

The Tran River is the longest river in Lebak with a total length of 120 km (75 mi) followed by Salaman River 36.4 km (22.6 mi) and Nuling River (Barurao) 19 km (12 mi).

The approximate land area of the municipality of Lebak as of December 31, 1999, is 514.034445 square kilometers. But for planning purposes, the area used is 47,000 hectares, pursuant to the DBM supported by the Land Management Bureau/ Bureau of Lands. Of the 27 barangays, Salangsang has the largest area with 77.2850 square kilometres (29.8399 sq mi), followed by Keytodac with 63.8987 square kilometres (24.6714 sq mi), Villamonte with 46.4137 square kilometres (17.9204 sq mi) and Poloy-Poloy with 338.8183 square kilometres (130.8185 sq mi); while Poblacion III has the smallest area with 5.79411 square kilometres (2.23712 sq mi).

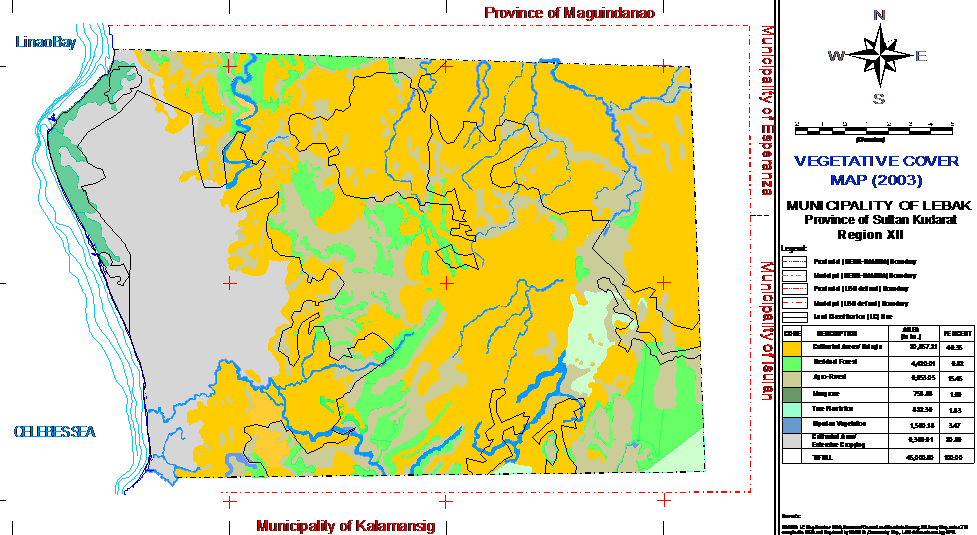
Vegetative map for Lebak

=== Land Formation ===
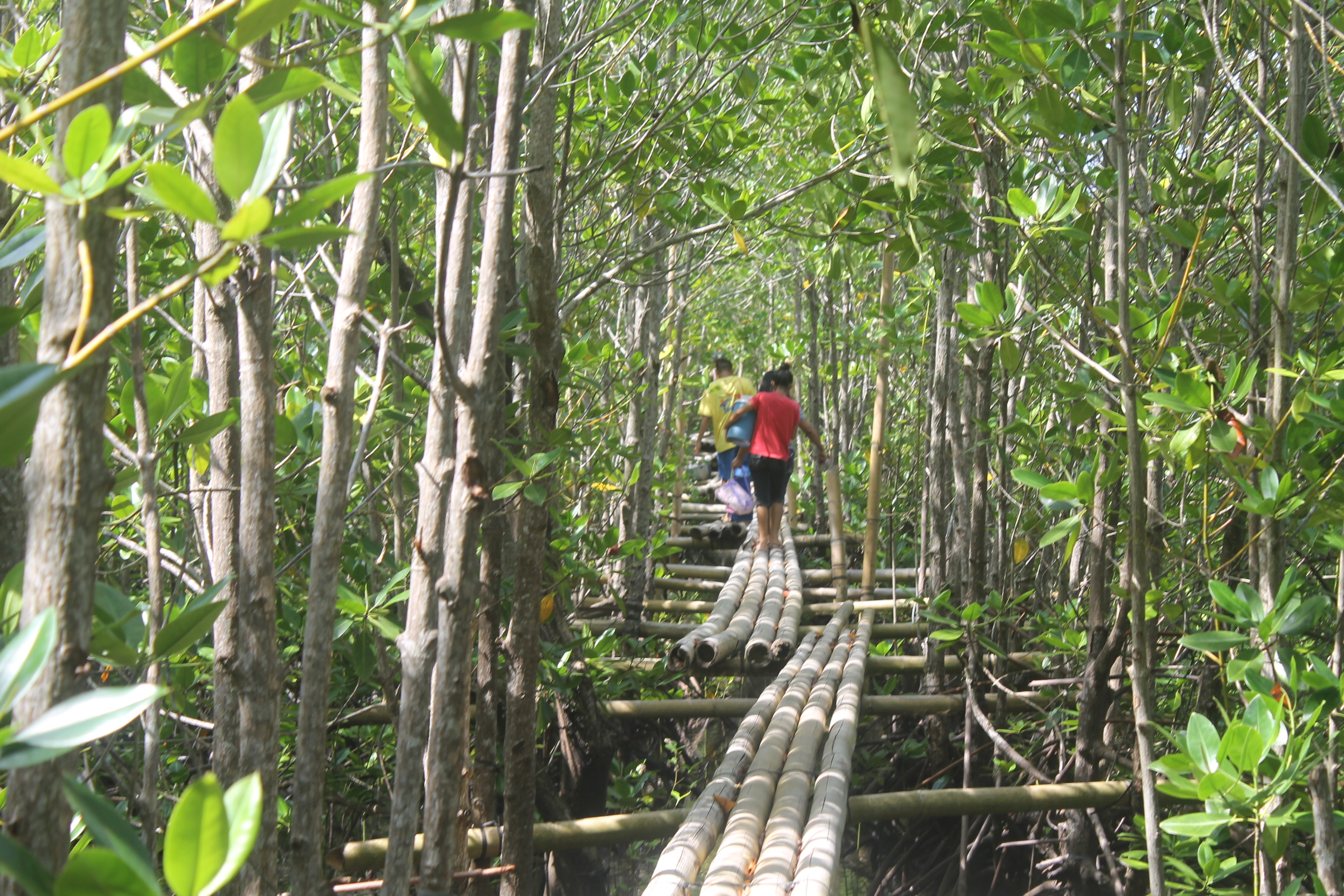
The Mangrove forest in wetlands of Lebak, Sultan Kudarat

Lebak is marked with hilly, mountainous ranges. The plains range from level to nearly level while uplands range from nearly level to hilly mountainous and gently rolling slopes which are suitable for intensive rice and corn farming. Silty Loam which is best suited for agricultural crops such as rice, corn and vegetables. This covers 37.36% or 17,500 has of the total land area. Soils Un-differentiated which is favorable suited to grazing, pasture, forest and agro-forestry. This covers a total of 29,440 has or 62.64%.

=== Hydrology/ natural resources ===
The Municipality is rich in natural resources. Its fishing ground abounds with fish of various species for domestic consumption and export. Marine products bring substantial income to a marginal fisherman. Fishing grounds are practically untapped. Identified watershed areas are Barurao Watershed (6,817.62), Salaman Watershed (8,176 ha.), Tran-Sucong Watershed (8,518.65) and Tran River Watershed (10,230 Ha.).

Groundwater information

	Results	Remarks
pH Level	9-May	
Nitrate concentration	Below standard	Bolebak has traced, Ragandang has 1 mg\L, Poblacion 1 has 2 mg\L
		The rest not yet contaminated with nitrates
Dissolved Oxygen		Bolebak, Pasandalan, Poblacion 1 and Tibpuan- conformed to the minimum 5 mg
Iron		Poblacion 3, Poloy-Poloy, Purikay, Salaman and Tibpuan – trace, Nuling
		Pansud and Tran- greater than 1.2 mg\L
		Rest no Iron detected
Total Dissolved Solids		Only Pasandalan and Salaman – above maximum limit (500 mg\l)
Conductivity		only Salaman has conductivity above 1000 us/cm
Hardness		Only Barurao I and Poloy-Poloy did not conform. Slightly above maximum limit.
Turbidity	Clear	Below 5 NTU
Salinity	Not saline	Below 1000 mg/l

The water resources of Lebak consist of Tran River 120 km (75 mi), Salaman River 36.4 km (22.6 mi), and Barurao River 19 km (12 mi) the Makin and Ebi Waterfalls, Nuling, Salangsang and Ebi Springs. Some are tapped for irrigation and other purposes.

=== Climate ===
Climate data for Lebak, Sultan Kudarat
Month	Jan	Feb	Mar	Apr	May	Jun	Jul	Aug	Sep	Oct	Nov	Dec	Year
Mean daily maximum °C (°F)	31 (88)	31 (88)	32 (90)	31 (88)	30 (86)	29 (84)	29 (84)	29 (84)	30 (86)	30 (86)	30 (86)	31 (88)	30 (87)
Mean daily minimum °C (°F)	23 (73)	23 (73)	23 (73)	24 (75)	25 (77)	25 (77)	24 (75)	24 (75)	24 (75)	24 (75)	24 (75)	24 (75)	24 (75)
Average precipitation mm (inches)	119 (4.7)	99 (3.9)	132 (5.2)	147 (5.8)	256 (10.1)	291 (11.5)	287 (11.3)	286 (11.3)	228 (9.0)	227 (8.9)	208 (8.2)	135 (5.3)	2,415 (95.2)
Average rainy days	19.2	17.9	20.9	24.6	29.4	29.1	29.7	28.9	27.2	28.5	27.2	22.5	305.1
Source: Meteoblue

Under the Köppen climate classification system, the municipality of Lebak features a tropical rainforest climate. Together with the rest of the Philippines, Lebak has a mild climate with evenly distributed rainfall throughout the year. Being located outside of the typhoon path, it does not experience tropical depressions, typhoons and devastating winds. Mean relative humidity for the Municipality of Lebak is 87%. The highest humidity is 89.5% and the lowest is 83.6%.

The municipality of Lebak falls under TYPE IV classification. Rainfall is more or less evenly distributed throughout the year. Prevailing winds- light to moderate.

The municipality of Lebak, PAG-ASA recorded mean maximum and minimum temperatures of 34.3 and 32.5 °C (93.7 and 90.5 °F), respectively.

Mean, Maximum and Minimum Temperature ( °C ):

=== Barangays ===
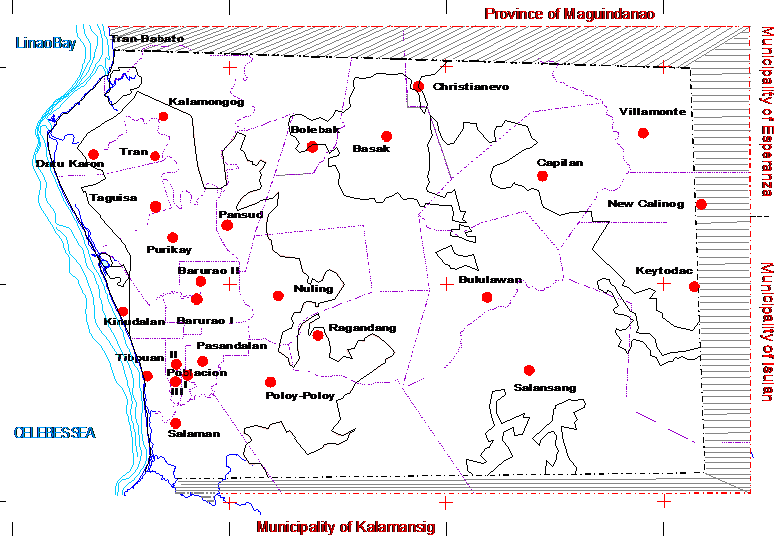
Administrative map for Lebak

Lebak is politically subdivided into 27 barangays. Each barangay consists of puroks while some have sitios.

- Aurelio F. Freires (Poblacion II)
- Barurao
- Barurao II
- Basak
- Bolebak
- Bululawan
- Capilan
- Christiannuevo
- Datu Karon
- Kalamongog
- Keytodac
- Kinodalan
- New Calinog
- Nuling
- Pansud
- Pasandalan
- Poblacion I
- Poblacion III
- Poloy-poloy
- Purikay
- Ragandang
- Salaman
- Salangsang
- Taguisa
- Tibpuan
- Tran
- Villamonte

Datu Guiabar is a newly created barangay carved out from barangay Poloy-poloy. It is not officially recognized until plebiscite is held.

== Demographics ==
Population census of Lebak
Year	Pop.	±% p.a.
1918	889	—
1939	5,403	+8.97%
1948	67	−38.60%
1960	22,173	+62.16%
1970	27,538	+2.19%
1975	31,478	+2.72%
1980	37,851	+3.75%
1990	52,428	+3.31%
1995	61,884	+3.16%
2000	70,899	+2.96%
2007	77,139	+1.17%
2010	83,280	+2.83%
2015	88,868	+1.24%
2020	91,344	+0.58%
2024	93,312	+0.51%
Source: Philippine Statistics Authority

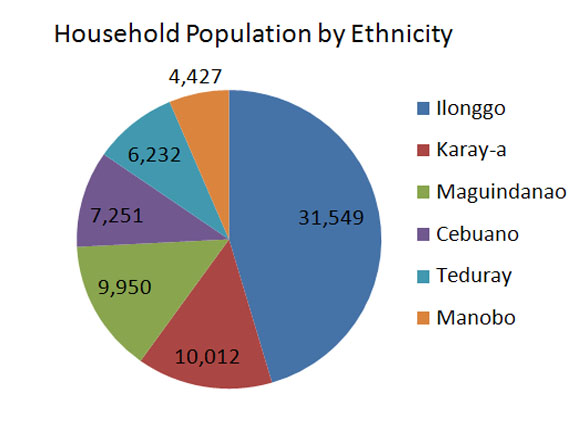
Household population by ethnicity of the municipality of Lebak.

The population of Lebak by age group reveals a dominance of the young population. Based on the 2007 population, children under five years old made up 14% or 11,163 of the total population of the municipality, lower than the percentage for the age group 5 – 9 which is 14.67% or 11,234 of the same year.

Child dependency ratio registered at 78.73% meaning 78 children dependents for every 100 working population. Total dependency ratio is 84.15%, the higher the total dependency ratio, the heavier the burden of the working age population.

Economically dependent persons less than 15 years old are about 32,979 or 42.75%, Working age population registered 41,888 or 54.23% are between the ages 15–64.

The percentage of female population in the reproductive age (15–49) registered 36,534 or 47.28%. About 47,436 or 61.51% of both men and women belonged to the age group 24 years and below. The population by age group declines with increase in age.

The population of those belonging to ages 65 years and over or the elderly population constitutes a very small proportion of the population. Population age 65 and above constitutes 2,272 or 5.4% of the total population. Old age dependency ratio is 5.4%, meaning for every 100 working population there are 5 old age dependent persons.

The working age group of 15 to 64 years old makes up 54% or 41,888 of the population while 43% or 32,979 are 14 years or younger and 5% or 2,272 are 65 years old or above.

Male population in the municipality is slightly higher than that of the female. The same is true in all barangays. Male population registered a total of 39,958 or 51.80% and 37,181 or 48.20%. The municipality is predominated by males showing males per 100 females.

=== Religion ===
There are 4 major religious groups in the municipality of Lebak. These are the Roman Catholic which accounts for 62% of the total population, Islam, 15%, Protestants, 8% and UCCP, 7%. The remaining percentage is distributed to Evangelical, United Pentecostal Church and other religions which make up 8%.

=== Languages ===
The most widely spoken language is Hiligaynon (41.06%), followed by Karay-a (12.98%), Maguindanaon (12.91%), Cebuano (9.42%), Teduray (8.08%), Ilocano (7%), Manobo (5.74%), and 4.57% for other languages.

== Economy ==
Poverty incidence of Lebak (%)

Source: Philippine Statistics Authority

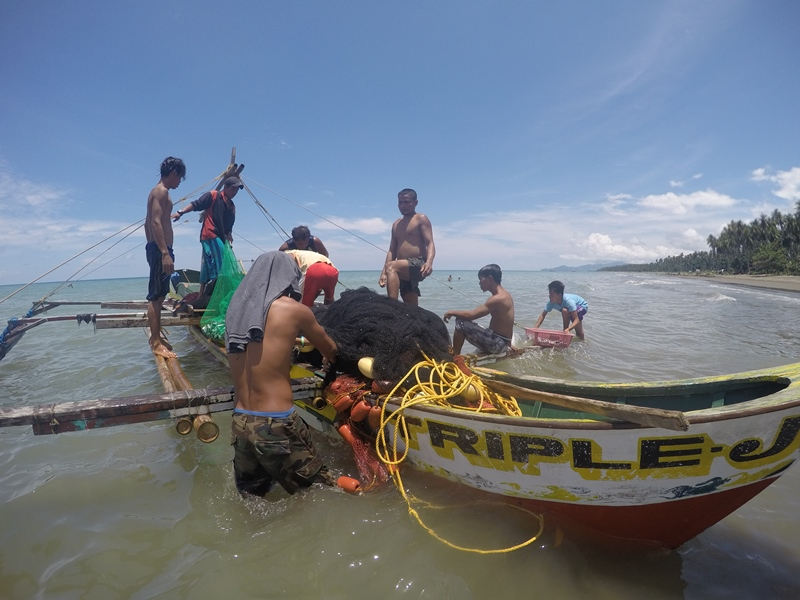
Fishing, Fish Catch, Fisherman of Lebak

This municipality managed to boost its local economy to its full potential. Saturday market was started as early as the 1960s and the market days still observe today. The opening of new routes and improvement in transport system are expect to deliver the town into an economic promise. Strengthen inter-regional trade linkage, gain access to potential agricultural production and will support various economic activities in the adjacent areas.

The 2016, National Competitiveness Council shows that the size of the local economy has total registered business gross sales of Php. 789,977,450.84.

=== Agriculture Sector ===
Agriculture is the primary source of income. Corn, rice and coconut are the most extensive crops grown. Cacao most commonly intercropped with coconut while the coffee is still a major crop.

Crops	Area Harvested	Production (metric tons)
Rice		
Irrigated	6,241.2	29,957.8
Rainfed	835.41	3,337.0
Corn		
Yellow Corn	10,236.20	52,204.70
White Corn	4,061.30	20,306.55

Livestock like swine/hog, ducks, cattle, carabao, goat and poultry products, fruits and vegetables.

Fishing Coastal barangay like Salaman, Tibpuan, Kinudalan, Datu Karon and Taguisa rely on fishing as their livelihood.

	Metric Tons	Area
Commercial	64 M.T.	207 hectares
Brackish aquaculture
Freshwater/backyard ponds	24 M.T.	50 hectares

Lebak is known for its produce like crabs (alimango), prawns (sugpo), milkfish (bangus) on its total of 247 Has. of shallow ponds. Shell fish are also abundant in shallow areas.

=== Communication ===
Smart Communications provide services like wireless 3G connection and broadband connection on its Smart Bro product. While Globe Telecom offers 3G and HSDPA signal that boost mobile internet connectivity. Some complain of unstable and frequent disconnection on Globe Tattoo and WiMax services. Fixed telephone line are provided by the Sultan Kudarat Telephone System Incorporated (SKTSI) subsidiary of PLDT.

FM station is also present in Lebak. The 105.1 MHz DXLR Radyo Natin of the Manila Broadcasting Company broadcast local news and advertisements with power of 500 Watts Kalamansig-Lebak Cable System, Inc. (KALECA) carries cable television signal to barangay Poblacion, Salaman, Pasandalan, Tibpuan, Barurao 1 & 2, Purikay and far as barangay Pansud. Direct-To-Home satellite TV such as G Sat, Cignal and Dream are common in the rural areas.

=== Banking, Financial and Utility Services ===
==== Banking ====
With total of 27 financial institutions includes 1 commercial banks and 2 rural banks, 5 finance cooperatives, 9 pawnshops, 2 foreign exchange dealers, 6 remittance centers and 2 microfinance institutions. 3 automated teller machines (ATMs) operated by Land Bank of the Philippines and One Network Bank.

==== Water Utilities ====
Local water utilities are supplied by Lebak Water District (LEWADI) with a rate of Php. 55.2/Per Cubic Meter.

==== Energy ====
As of March 31, 2017 Sultan Kudarat Electric Cooperative (SUKELCO) provides electricity for 70% of the residents. The electric distribution company energized all 27 barangays (100%), 264 sitios (57%) with 6,457 member-consumer and 14,693 connections. The average cost of Php 6.7/KwH for commercial and industrial users. SUKELCO Lebak is in constant power interruption and unreliable service. Several complaints like rude employee including its security guards pretending to be a manager of the power cooperative.

== Culture ==
Lebak is a melting pot of culture and tradition. Mainstream culture of Lebak is the Ilonggo, the greatest number of the populace. Maguindanaon and tribal traditions can still be observed on its local settlements. Manobos and Tiduray minorities still widely practice and observe. Part of the culture of the people of Lebak is the celebration of Fiesta. Patronal Fiesta Celebration every 4th Sunday of May. Some barangays has its own festival like in Basak, Taguisa, Villamonte, Salangsang, Keytodac and Tibpuan.

The Araw ng Lebak is celebrated during August 18 yearly and the Kapeonan Festival.

== Tourism ==
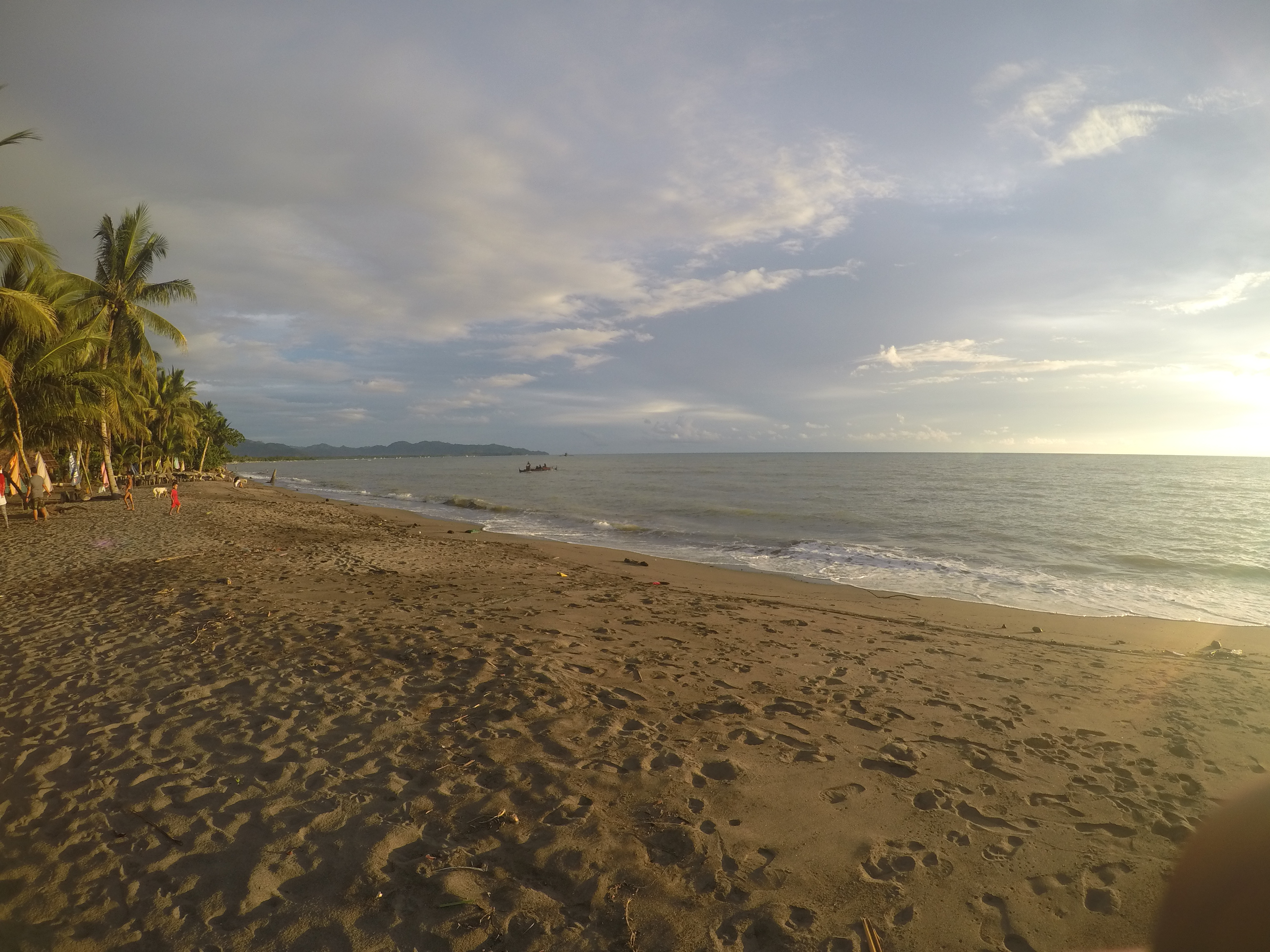
Lebak Shoreline

Lebak features several tourism attractions, including 19 kilometers of beaches and resorts, as well as the Katunggan Coastal Eco Park. The Eco Park contains 29 species of mangroves and stretches between the barangays of Salaman, Tibpuan and Kinudalan, Taguisa and Datu Karon.

The 720 hectare Eco Park estuary has also become a sanctuary for birds, fish, crustaceans and shellfish species. There are 237 hectares dedicated for eco-tourism which includes the beach, rivers, sandbars with developments such as a 1.6 kilometer bamboo boardwalk, forest ranger stations and cottages.

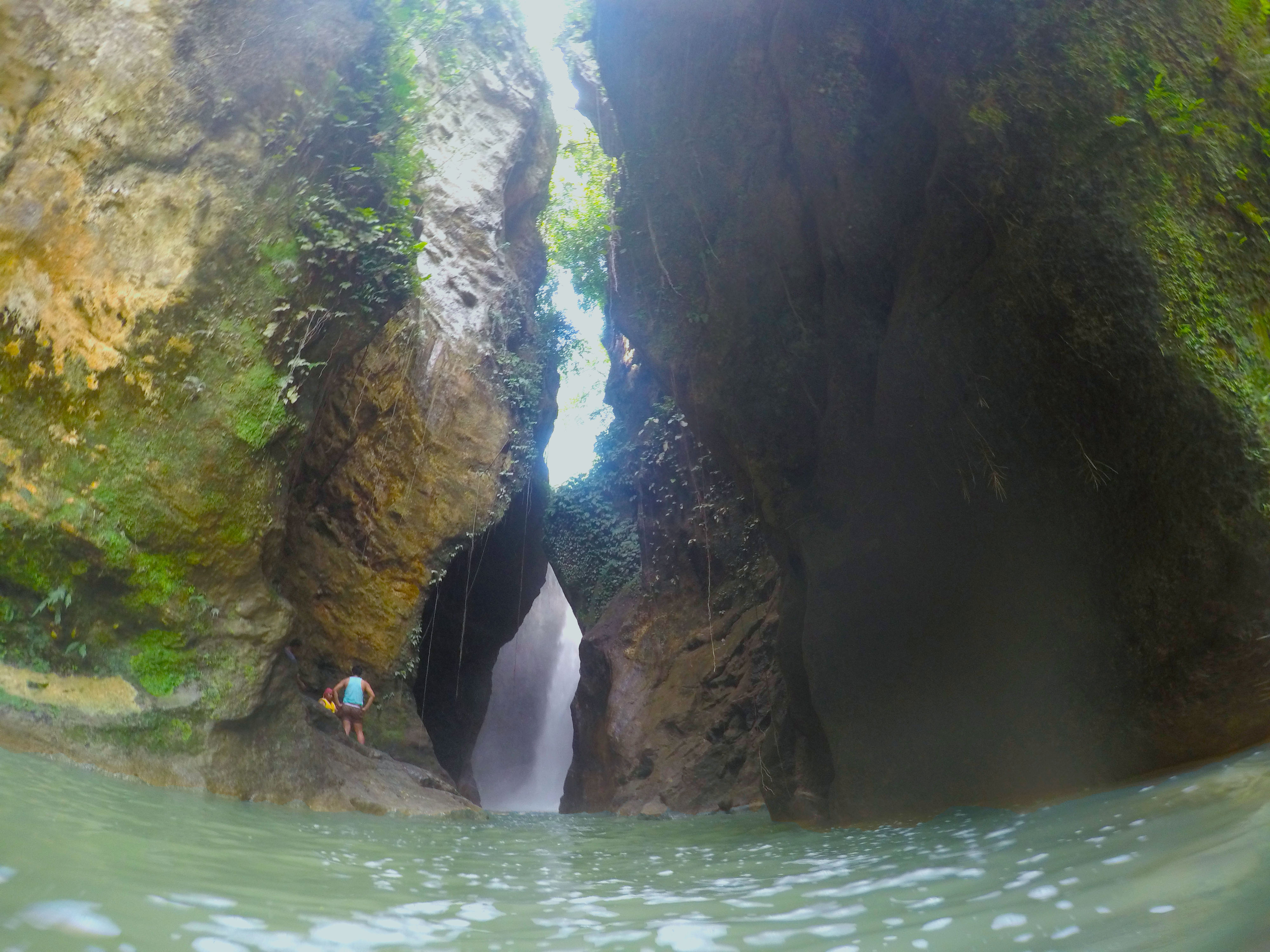
Photo of the entrance of Makin Falls at Villamonte, Lebak, Sultan Kudarat

Lebak also is home to several waterfalls such as the Makin Falls, the Tres-Andanas Falls and the Tenubak Cave and Falls.

Networks of caves can also be found in Salangsang, Keytodac, Bululawan and Capilan. These networks include the Camilmil pit, the Lom cave, the Kiangus pit, the Sataluday cave and the Capilan Bat cave.

Lebak is also home to hot springs in the barangay of Nuling.

== Government ==
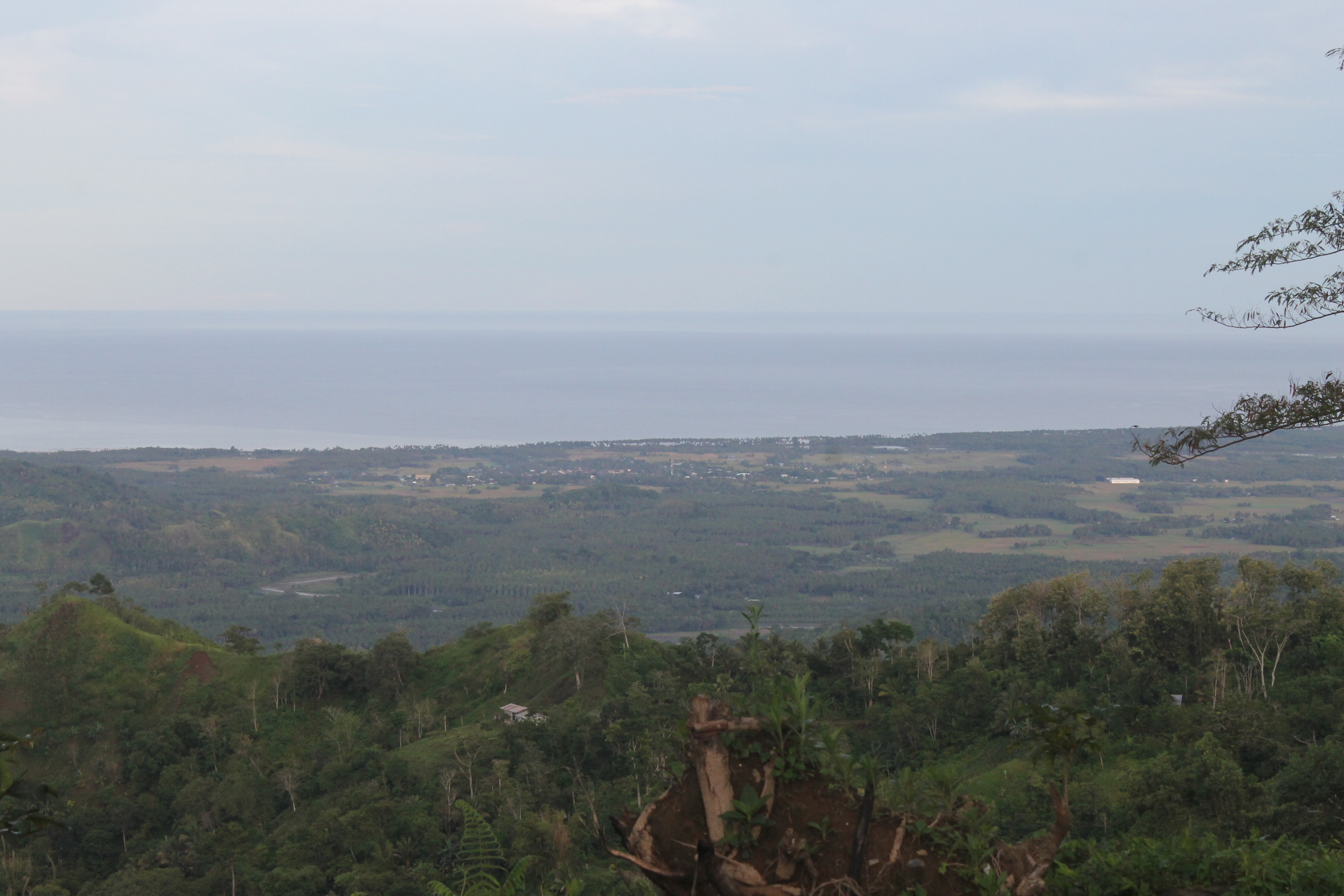
Lebak view seen from Km 12, Salangsang

=== List of former chief executives ===
- Aurelio F. Freires, Sr. 1948–1955
- Timoteo P. Belarmino 1956–1959
- Aurelio F. Freires, Sr. 1960–1963
- Aurelio C. Freires, Jr. 1964–1967
- Jorge T. Labog 1968–1971
- Romeo F. Almirante 1972–1975
- Reynaldo P. Palileo, Sr. 1976–1979
- Romeo F. Almirante 1980–1986 (died in office)
- Salvador G. Ang, MD 1986–1987 (appointed)
- David Gestosani 1987–1988 (appointed)
- Sergio P. Sabio 1988–1998
- Kahirup C. Ang, M.D. 1998–2003
- Gerardo S. Delasan 2003–2010
- Dionesio Besana 2010–2019
- Frederick Celestial 2019–Present

== Transportation ==
Lebak has a road network of 219.35 kilometers and 37.85 km are concrete, 111.5 km graveled road and 70 km of unpaved roads. The distance to the nearest airport (Awang Domestic Airport) is 53.99 km.

Transportation from and to the muicipalites was already in place since 1925. Early steamers like Fernadez Hermanos, Neil McLeod and Mindanao from Manila had regular call at Lebak port, Tablas had irregular interval while Research had irregular trips also survey the . Early hydrography made by steamer Pathfinder on February 4 until end of July 1914.

The lack of access to road Lebak was isolated for many years. These are Construction and Improvement of Awang-Upi-Lebak-Kalamansig Road, the Isulan – Bagumbayan, Senator Ninoy Aquino – Lebak Road, the planned Lebak-Kalamansig-Bagumbayan-Maitum Road.
Transport of goods from and into the town was very difficult and tricky before. Rough road to Isulan by provincial road sometimes take 1 day. The shipping from Port of Cotabato to Lebak by motorboat locally called lantsa (an engine powered small boat) also took 12 hours of travel.

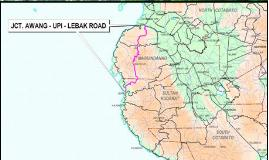
Junction Awang – Upi – Lebak – Kalamansig Road Project

Travel from Manila to Lebak is possible by plane via Manila-Gensan or Manila-Cotabato. The completion of the concrete national road from the junction of Awang — Upi — Lebak road could bring benefits to Lebak's economy.

It can be reached by Public Utility Jeep, vans and private vehicles for about eight to 12 hours to and from Isulan, and for about five hours via Cotabato City, the nearest city. Several Utility Van (UV Express) in Davao City, General Santos, Tacurong City, Cotabato City and Isulan have routes for Lebak.

Local transportation includes UV express, motor vehicles, trucks, modified motorcycle (habal-habal or skylab) and even horseback riding are common in some area. Motorboats are also available in coastal areas. This municipality has two airstrips: Lebak Municipal Airport (IATA: LWA 6°40′25″N 124°3′29″E), just 4 kilometers located at Kumalawit, Barangay Purikay is already concreted and will be fully operational accommodating from Cessna, turboprop to Airbus A320.

Another way of reaching this municipality is by the sea. The existing Port of Lebak which is 9 km in nearby municipality of Kalamansig.

== Education ==
The town has total of 10 secondary schools, 2 in private and 8 public schools. Literacy rate is at 93% and mostly having a secondary education.

Elementary education is divided into three districts: East, Central and West. These districts in total comprise the 11 primary schools, 26 elementary schools and three central schools of Lebak.

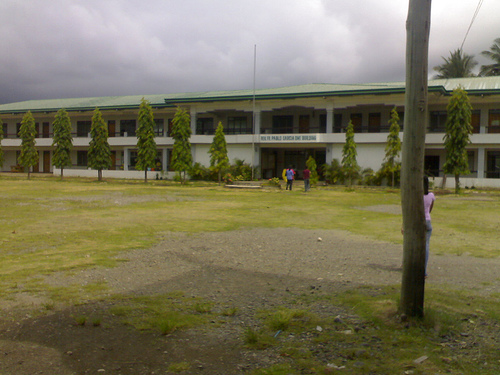
Notre Dame of Salaman College

Public High School

- E. Arcaño Mem. National High School (Basak National High School)
- Lebak Legislated National High School
- Purikay National High School
- Tran National High School
- Keytodac National High School
- Mangudadatu National High School
- Lebak National Highschool-Villamonte

Private High School

- Salaman Institute (SI)
- Notre Dame of Salaman College (NDSC) (High School)

Vocational and Tertiary Education

- Notre Dame of Salaman College
- Salaman Institute
- West Celebes College of Technology, Inc.
- Lebak Family Doctors Hospital and School of Midwifery

List of Elementary School (Elementary School) and Primary School (Primary School)

- Lebak East District – 11 Schools
1. Babato Primary School
2. Bolibak Elementary School
3. Christianuevo Primary School
4. Datu Karon Elementary School
5. Don M. Concha MElementary School (Taguisa Elementary School)
6. Nuling Elementary School
7. Pansud Elementary School
8. Celeste Central Elementary School
9. Tapudi Elementary School
10. Tinonggos Elementary School
11. Tran Elementary School
- Lebak Central District – 13 Schools
1. Adalla Primary School
2. Bululawan Primary School
3. Capilan Elementary School
4. Dimapitan Elementary School
5. Elem Primary School
6. F. Parohinog MElementary School (Basak Elementary School)
7. Keytodac Central Elementary School
8. Kimakang Primary School
9. New Calinog Elementary School
10. S.A. Balabagan Primary School
11. Salangsang Elementary School
12. Tibong-tibong Primary School
13. Villamonte Elementary School
- Lebak West District – 12 Schools
1. Ampad-Guibar MElementary School
2. B. Difunturom MElementary School (Poloy-Poloy Elementary School)
3. Barurao Elementary School
4. Gestosani Mem. Elementary School
5. Guintales Primary School
6. Kinudalan Elementary School
7. Lagandang Elementary School
8. Nabagbag Primary School
9. Pakil Central Elementary School
10. Pasandalan Elementary School
11. Posadas Primary School
12. Salaman Central Elementary School

== Healthcare ==
The health services are categorized into two. Public health services and private health services. The capacity of public health services are 3 doctors, 16 nurses, 30 midwives with 28 health centers and the private services have 7, nurses 16 and 11 midwives with 6 clinics and 2 hospitals.

- Lebak Doctors Hospital
- Lebak Santo Niño Hospital
- Lebak Medical Group of Hospital
- Medicare Community Hospital of Lebak
- Lebak Family Doctors Hospital
- Sabio Medical Clinic
- Municipal Health Center (Birthing Section)
- Labian Medical Clinic

== Sister cities ==
- (Philippines) City of Makati (since 2011)
- (Philippines) Cotabato City

== See also ==
- History of the Philippines
