= Esperanza, Sultan Kudarat =

Municipality in Sultan Kudarat, Philippines

Esperanza
- Municipality
- Municipality of Esperanza

Other transcription(s)
  - Jawi: اسڤيرنس
- Municipal Hall

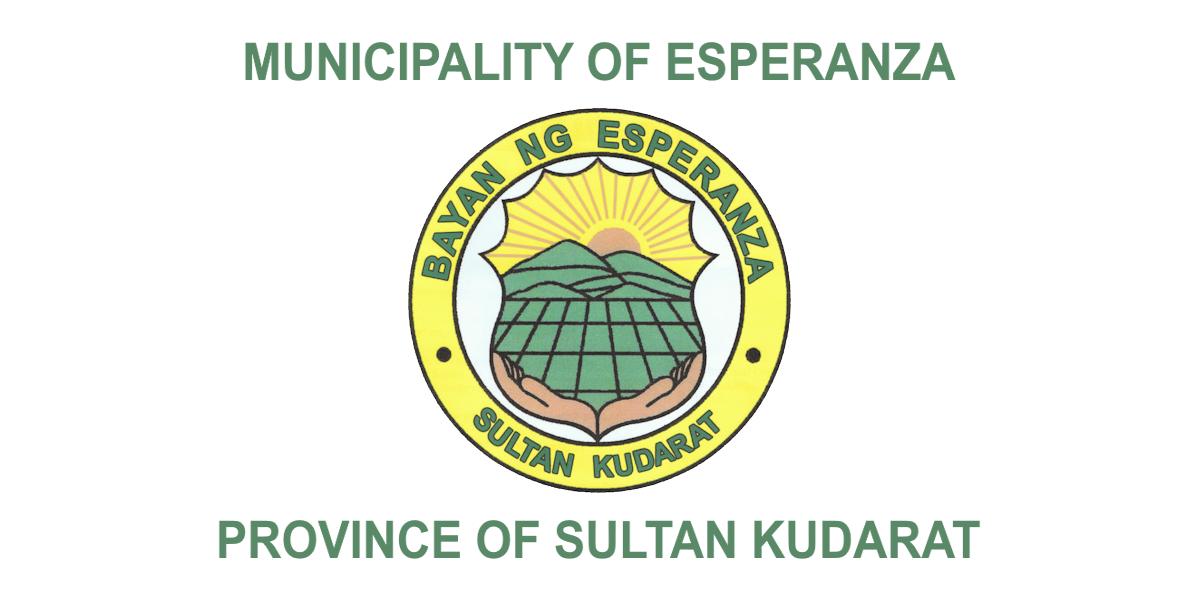
- Flag Seal

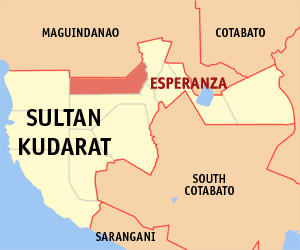
- Map of Sultan Kudarat with Esperanza highlighted
- Interactive map of Esperanza
- Location within the Philippines
- Coordinates: 6°43′20″N 124°31′12″E
- Country: Philippines
- Region: Soccsksargen
- Province: Sultan Kudarat
- District: 2nd district
- Founded: November 22, 1973
- Barangays: 19 (see Barangays)

Government
  - Type: Sangguniang Bayan
  - Mayor: Charles Federic R. Ploteña
  - Vice Mayor: Lalaine Villaruel-Suhanda
  - Representative: Horacio P. Suansing Jr.
  - Electorate: 46,667 voters (2025)

Area
  - Total: 324.29 km^{2} (125.21 sq mi)
- Elevation: 54 m (177 ft)
- Highest elevation: 237 m (778 ft)
- Lowest elevation: 31 m (102 ft)

Population (2024 census)
  - Total: 73,822
  - Density: 227.64/km^{2} (589.59/sq mi)
  - Households: 19,309

Economy
  - Income class: 1st municipal income class
  - Poverty incidence: 22.81% (2023)
  - Revenue: ₱ 339.6 million (2024)
  - Assets: ₱ 1,681 million (2024)
  - Expenditure: ₱ 269.7 million (2024)
  - Liabilities: ₱ 819.2 million (2024)

Service provider
  - Electricity: Sultan Kudarat Electric Cooperative (SUKELCO)
- Time zone: UTC+8 (PST)
- ZIP code: 9806
- PSGC: 1206503000
- IDD : area code: +63 (0)64
- Native languages: Hiligaynon; Maguindanao; Tagalog; Teduray
- Website: www.lgu-esperanza.gov.ph

Esperanza, officially the Municipality of Esperanza (Hiligaynon: Banwa sang Esperanza; Maguindanaon: Inged nu Ispiransa, Jawi: ايڠد نو اسڤيرنس); Tagalog: Bayan ng Esperanza, is a municipality in the province of Sultan Kudarat, Philippines. According to the 2024 census, it has a population of 73,822 people.

== History ==
“Esperanza,” a Spanish word meaning “hope,” is believed to have been derived from the name given to the first child born in the early settlement of Dulawan. According to local tradition, the settlers named the baby girl Esperanza in the belief that her birth would symbolize and inspire peace, unity, and prosperity within the community.

In 1952, a group of Christian settlers established a settlement in Villamor within the then municipal district of Dulawan (presently known as barangay Villamor).

In 1953, motivated by the primary concern for the education of their children, the settlers petitioned the school authorities for a school at Barrio Villamor. And on the opening of that school year, the Villamor Primary School started. In the same year, purok leader Silverio Africa of Purok Esperanza initiated and requested a government survey for the proposed bario site of Esperanza with the expressed approval of Datu Into Saliao. The survey was officially known and identified as TS–310.

When the Cotabato–General Santos City National Highway was constructed. Esperanza became an independent barrio of Dulawan, Cotabato with Silverio Africa as the first "Barrio Lieutenant".

In 1956, Datu Into Saliao, a prominent Datu of the place has distributed lands to the people either by lease, share system and even donation to those close to him. By this philanthropic benevolence, people from all walks of life flocked to his barrio. Residential houses mushroomed around and that was the beginning of the programs of Esperanza.

Upon written petition of the residents, the municipality of Ampatuan was created by virtue of Republic Act No. 2509 which was enacted and approved into law without executive approval on June 21, 1959. Esperanza was created by virtue of Presidential Decree No. 339 dated November 22, 1973, issued by President Ferdinand E. Marcos. The place progressed rapidly because of its location and philanthropic act of prominent leader of the place named Datu Into Saliao who welcomed the immigrants to the area.

In 1995, Esperanza suffered losses in agricultural crops, implements, farm animals and houses other properties when Lake Maughan overflowed due to heavy rains.

The municipality of Esperanza was transferred from Cotabato Province to Province of Sultan Kudarat on November 22, 1973, by presidential decree 341 of President Ferdinand E. Marcos.

== Geography ==
=== Barangays ===
Esperanza is politically subdivided into 19 barangays. Each barangay consists of puroks while some have sitios.

- Ala
- Daladap
- Dukay
- Guiamalia
- Ilian
- Kangkong
- Laguinding
- Magsaysay
- Margues
- New Panay
- Numo
- Paitan
- Pamantingan
- Poblacion
- Sagasa
- Salabaca
- Saliao
- Salumping
- Villamor

=== Climate ===
Climate data for Esperanza, Sultan Kudarat
Month	Jan	Feb	Mar	Apr	May	Jun	Jul	Aug	Sep	Oct	Nov	Dec	Year
Mean daily maximum °C (°F)	31 (88)	31 (88)	32 (90)	32 (90)	31 (88)	30 (86)	29 (84)	30 (86)	30 (86)	30 (86)	30 (86)	31 (88)	31 (87)
Mean daily minimum °C (°F)	23 (73)	23 (73)	23 (73)	24 (75)	24 (75)	24 (75)	24 (75)	24 (75)	24 (75)	24 (75)	24 (75)	23 (73)	24 (74)
Average precipitation mm (inches)	64 (2.5)	45 (1.8)	59 (2.3)	71 (2.8)	140 (5.5)	179 (7.0)	192 (7.6)	198 (7.8)	163 (6.4)	147 (5.8)	113 (4.4)	66 (2.6)	1,437 (56.5)
Average rainy days	12.2	10.3	12.7	15.7	26.0	27.4	28.1	28.2	26.0	26.7	22.9	16.6	252.8
Source: Meteoblue

== Demographics ==
Population census of Esperanza
Year	Pop.	±% p.a.
1975	18,711	—
1980	28,149	+8.51%
1990	35,585	+2.37%
1995	43,374	+3.78%
2000	47,578	+2.00%
2007	52,731	+1.43%
2010	63,207	+6.82%
2015	66,095	+0.85%
2020	74,696	+2.61%
2024	73,822	−0.28%
Source: Philippine Statistics Authority

Maguindanaon and Teduray is the indigenous ethnic groups of the municipality, while the Hiligaynon (Ilonggo) are settlers originally from Iloilo in Visayas.

== Economy ==
Poverty incidence of Esperanza (%)

Source: Philippine Statistics Authority

== Culture ==
=== Hinabyog festival ===
The winning entry of NDEi (top) and one of the ENHS entries (bottom) at Hinabyog 2005, held in NDEi campus.

Esperanza celebrated the very first Hinabyog festival in November 2005. The word "Hinabyog" translates to the English word "swayed". This resembles to the idea of a "Bamboo swing" or more likely to be a hammock made in bamboo wood, which are very popular in the place.

Hinabyog festival was celebrated by showing different kinds of Bamboo swing/hammock and showing the importance of it. The celebration is likely to be started by a parade of "Drum and Lyre Corps" from schools all over Esperanza. Parades of hired Kings and Queens of the festival is also entered. And the most important part of the celebration is the Hinabyog Dance competition.

The participants for the competitions must be performed by students from schools around the municipality. The Hinabyog Dance Competition is themed by tribal music and dance steps. It is also being referenced to the Bamboo hammocks which mainly being used as props for the dance. Music comes from a group of drummers which must also come from the school.

Unfortunately, in the first Hinabyog Dance Competition, only two schools have entered. The Notre Dame of Esperanza Inc. (NDEi) and The Esperanza National Highschool (ENHS). ENHS have entered three entries for the competition, while NDEi have only given one. Although the stakes are high for the NDEi entry to win, they still managed to win the competition. The winner of the competition is automatically entered for the "Kalimudan Festival" or "The Festival of All Festivals" held in Isulan, Sultan Kudarat, to represent Esperanza and to compete against other municipalities. Which luckily, they have managed to win from and beating the 12 other competitors.

== Government ==
=== List of former chief executives ===
- Esperidion Limson - 1971
- Mariano Carumba - 1978
- Romulo L. Latog, Sr. - 1982
- Roberto E. Examen - 1986
- Jose A. Dequito - 1987
- Romulo L. Latog, Sr. - 1988
- Fernando L. Ploteña - 1995
- Romulo L. Latog, Jr. - 2001
- Helen T. Latog - 2019
- Charles Ploteña - present

== Education ==
- Notre Dame of Esperanza Inc.
- Esperanza National High School
- Esperanza Central School
- Notre Dame of Dukay Inc.
- Romulo Latog Sr. Elementary School
- Paitan Elementary School
- Sagasa Elementary School
- New Panay National High School
- New Panay Elementary School
- Guiamalia Elementary School
- Daladap Elementary School
- Salabaca Elementary School
- Salabaca National High School
- Magsaysay Elementary School
- Kangkong Elementary School
- Ala Elementary School
- Saliao Elementary School
