= Central Philippine languages =

Subgroup of the Austronesian language family

Central Philippine
- Geographic distribution: Philippines, Malaysia (eastern seaboard of Sabah state), Indonesia (northeastern part of North Kalimantan province)
- Linguistic classification: Austronesian: Malayo-Polynesian; Philippine?; Greater Central Philippine; Central Philippine
- Proto-language: Proto-Central Philippine
- Subdivisions: Kasiguranin–Tagalog; Bikol; Mansakan; Bisayan

Language codes
- Glottolog: cent2246

The Central Philippine languages are the most geographically widespread demonstrated group of languages in the Philippines, being spoken in southern Luzon, Visayas, Mindanao, and Sulu. They are also the most populous, including Tagalog (and Filipino), Bikol, and the major Visayan languages Cebuano, Hiligaynon, Waray, Kinaray-a, and Tausug, with some forty languages all together.

== Classification ==
=== Overview ===
The languages are generally subdivided thus (languages in italics refer to a single language):

- Kasiguranin–Tagalog (at least three dialects found in southern Luzon)
- Bikol (six languages in the Bicol Peninsula and two from Catanduanes)
- Bisayan (eighteen languages spoken in the whole Visayas, as well as southeastern Luzon, northeastern Mindanao and Sulu)
- Mansakan (eleven languages of the Davao Region)

There are in addition several Aeta hill-tribal languages of uncertain affiliation: Ata, Sorsogon Ayta, Tayabas Ayta, Karolanos (Northern Binukidnon), Magahat (Southern Binukidnon), Sulod, and Umiray Dumaget.

Most of the Central Philippine languages in fact form a dialect continuum and cannot be sharply distinguished as separate languages. Blust (2009) notes that the relatively low diversity found among the Visayan languages is due to recent population expansions.

=== Zorc (1977) ===
The expanded tree of the Central Philippine languages below is given in David Zorc's 1977 Ph.D. dissertation. The Visayan subgrouping is Zorc's own work, while the Bikol subgrouping is from McFarland (1974) and the Mansakan subgrouping from Gallman (1974).

Individual languages are marked by italics, and primary branches by bold italics.

- Central Philippine
  - Tagalog
    - Standard Filipino
    - Marinduque
    - Lubang
  - Bikol
    - Pandan (North Catanduanes)
    - Inland Bikol
      - Iriga (Rinconada Bikol)
      - Albay Bikol
    - Coastal Bikol (including the Naga City dialect)
      - Central Bikol
      - Virac (South Catanduanes)
  - Visayan
    - South (spoken on the eastern coast of Mindanao)
      - Butuan–Tausug
        - Tausug
        - Butuanon
      - Surigao
        - Surigaonon, Jaun-Jaun, Kantilan, Naturalis
    - Cebuan (spoken in Cebu, Bohol, western Leyte, northern Mindanao, and eastern Negros)
      - Cebuan
        - Cebuano, Boholano, Leyte
    - Central (spoken across most of the Visayan region)
      - Warayan
        - Waray–Samar
          - Waray, Samar-Leyte
          - Northern Samar
        - Gubat (South Sorsogon)
      - Peripheral
        - Sorsogon (North), Masbate
        - Camotes
        - Bantayan
        - Hiligaynon (Ilonggo), Capiznon, Kawayan
      - Romblon
        - Romblomanon
    - Banton/Asi (spoken in northwestern Romblon Province)
      - Banton
        - Banton, Odionganon, Simara, Calatrava, Sibale
    - West
      - Aklan (spoken in northern Panay)
        - Aklanon
      - Kinarayan (spoken in Panay)
        - Pandan, Kinaray-a, Gimaras
      - North-Central (spoken on Tablas Island and the southern tip of Mindoro)
        - Bulalakaw, Dispoholnon, Looknon, Alcantaranhon
      - Kuyan (spoken in the archipelagos west of Panay and Romblon, as well as the southern tip of Mindoro)
        - Datagnon, Santa Teresa, Semirara
        - Kuyonon
  - Mansakan
    - North Mansakan
      - Kamayo (North) and Kamayo (South)
    - Davaw
      - Davawenyo (Davaweño)
    - Eastern Mansakan
      - Isamal
      - Caraga (Karaga)
      - Kabasagan, Boso, Mansaka, Mandayan
    - Western Mansakan
      - Kalagan and Tagakaolo
  - Mamanwa
    - Mamanwa

=== Gallman (1997) ===
Andrew Gallman (1997) rejects Zorc's classification of the Mansakan languages and Mamanwa as primary branches of the Central Philippine languages coordinate to the Bisayan languages. Instead, he groups Mansakan, Mamanwa and the Southern Bisayan languages together into an "East Mindanao" subgroup, which links up with the remaining Bisayan branches in a "South Central Philippine" subgroup:

- Central Philippine
  - Tagalog
  - Bikol
  - South Central Philippine
    - West Bisayan
    - Banton
    - Central Bisayan
    - Cebuan
    - East Mindanao
      - North East Mindanao
        - Mamanwa
        - Surigaonon
        - Butuanon-Tausug
      - Central East Mindanao
        - Kamayo
        - Davawenyo (Banganga)
        - Davawenyo (Digos)
      - South East Mindanao
        - Mandaya (Kabasagan)
        - Mandaya (Caraga)
        - Mansaka, Mandaya (Maragusan), Mandaya (Boso)
          - (Branch)
            - Mandaya (Islam)
            - Kalagan (Kaagan), Kalagan (Tagakaulu)

=== Greater Central Philippine (Blust) ===
Blust (1991) notes that the central and southern Philippines has low linguistic diversity. Based on exclusively shared lexical innovations, he posits a Greater Central Philippine subgroup that puts together the Central Philippine branch with South Mangyan, Palawan, Danao, Manobo, Subanon and Gorontalo–Mongondow languages, the latter found in northern Sulawesi.
