= Kalagan people =

Austronesian ethnic group of the southern Philippines

Kalagan
Kagan Kaagan

Total population
- 87,327 (2020 census)

Regions with significant populations
- Philippines

Languages
- Native; Kalagan; Also; Cebuano, Filipino, English

Religion
- Sunni Islam

Related ethnic groups
- Maguindanaon • Tagakaulo • Mandaya–Mansaka • Blaan

The Kalagan (also known as Kagan, Kaagan, or in Spanish as Caragan) is a subgroup of the Mandaya–Mansaka people who speak the Kalagan language. The Kalagan comprise three subgroups which are usually treated as different tribes: the Tagakaulo, the Kagan, and the Kallao of Samal. They are native to areas within Davao del Sur, Davao de Oro, Davao del Norte (including Samal Island), Davao Oriental, and Cotabato; between the territories of the Blaan people and the coastline. They were historically composed of small warring groups. They are renowned as agriculturalists, cultivating rice, corn, abaca, and coconut for cash crops, whereas their counterparts living along the coast practice fishing.

The name "Kalagan" (also "Kaagan" or "Kagan", depending on subgroup) literally means '[strong] spirited', 'fierce', or 'brave'; from kalag ('spirit' or 'soul') in the native animistic anito religions. The whole Provincia de Caraga in 1622 was called region de gente animosa ('region of spirited folk') by Spanish colonizers for the same reason. They were historically composed of small groups led by datus.

The Kagan subgroup is the Islamized-indigenous people in the Davao Gulf area and known by the nickname "Davao Moros". They are one of the Muslim minority groups in Mindanao and belong to the 13 Moro Muslim tribes of the Bangsamoro family. They became Muslim in the middle of the 19th century due to extensive exposure or contact with the communities of their Maguindanaon neighbors, and intermarriages between Kalagan and Maguindanaons. Thus making Islamized Kagan heavily influenced by Maguindanaon culture.

== Geography ==
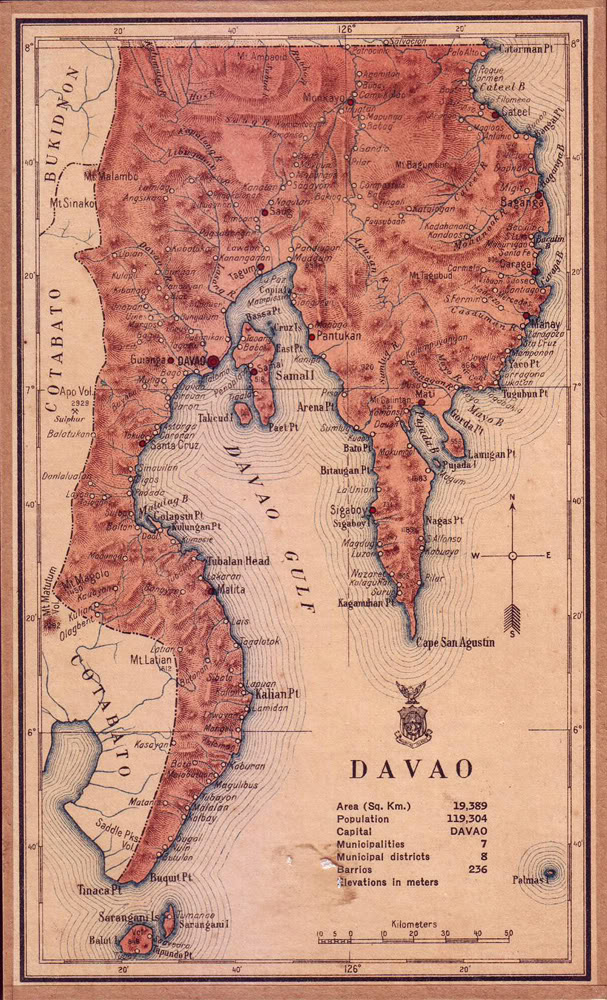
Davao province map shows the old Kagan town settlements, 1918.

The Kalagan people are most predominantly found on the River Delta areas surrounding the shorelines of Davao Gulf.

They live in the district of Sirawan, Bangkal, and Maa of Davao City; Kaganguwan in Panabo City; Hijo, Bingcongan, and Madaum in Tagum; Davao del Norte (including Samal Island); Piso, Macangao, Sumlog, Kaligaran, Lukatan, Mati in Davao Oriental; Pantukan, Mabini, and Maco in Davao de Oro; and some areas in Cotabato; between the territories of the Blaan people, and the Mandaya–Mansaka. The Caraga Region and the municipality of Caraga, Davao Oriental are named after them.

== Etymology ==
Kagan came from the word kaag, which means to inform, secure, or secrecy. It is a native word used by the tribe earlier when they have to inform the people in the tribe and also their neighbouring tribes, the Mandayas and Mansakas about something happening since they are living in the river keys and coastal areas of Davao. The other term also is Ka – allagan which means shining light referring to the sun as they are believed to be more advanced in lifestyle and society than their neighbouring tribes which live on the highlands of the mountains of Davao.

== History ==
=== Pre-Islamic era ===
The Kalagans lived in communities called banwa. The banwas were usually located at the rivers and the river keys of Davao. Each banwa has its leader called a datu. The datu is usually a man with strong political and physical leadership in the community.

Before Islam came to Mindanao, the early Kalagans were believed to be animists and they believed that there was one supreme God called Tagallang, which means "creator". They also believed that all of nature like trees, stones, mountains, the river, and the ocean has a spirit, that they called maguya. The Kalagan respected the maguya by performing ceremonial rituals.

The ones who perform the rituals are priests called balyans which means shaman or healer or the ones who can contact the spirits by asking for cures for the sick, for the guidance and security of the tribe, and even fortune-telling. The balyans may either be a man or woman, and they are specialized in contacting the spiritual realm. Same as the Mandayas, the Kalagan people contact the spiritual realm by performing a kulintang and a ritual dance holding a kasag, a native shield with bells surrounding it, while the balyans dance, the bells creating a sound as an activation of the spirits to enter the body of the balyan.

=== Sultanate era and beyond ===
It is believed that Kalagans were Islamized by the early 16th century by Muslim missionaries from their neighboring Maguindanaon tribe. They intermarried and shared their culture with the Kalagans and brought 4 Qurans to them for the guidance of the faith. These 4 Qurans still exist today and are owned by prominent families of the tribe. They follow the traditional Sunni Shafié of Islam, however many of them remain animist and still believe in the traditions and religion of their ancestors, practicing a mix of Islam and animism in their adat. Some Kalagans have been converted to Christianity upon missionary work and contact with new Christian migrant neighbors from Luzon and Visayas during the early 20th century.

== Language ==
The Kalagan language is similar to the Tagakaolo language but has increasingly incorporated some Tausug and Maguindanaon words. Some also know Cebuano, Filipino (Tagalog), English, and Arabic. It is related to the Mandayan language as well as Maguindanaon, Tausug, and Visayan languages.

Kagan	Maguindanaon	English
gadong	gadung	green
bero	bilu	blue
napas	napas	breath
atawa	atawa	or
bagi	bagi	destiny
kallini	kalini	like
karasay	kalasay	suffering
ginawa	ginawa	self
suwara	suara	voice
pakaradyan	pakaradyan	thanksgiving
tagaynap	taginep	dream
lugat	lugat	fatigue
mawat	mawatan	far
kawin	kawing	wedding
badan	badan	body
siksa	siksa	punish
paras	palas	face
pamili	pamili	to choose
uriyan	uliyan	end
gabun	gabun	cloud
gango	gangu	dry
dunya	dunya	world
sigay	sigay	shine
tanud	tanud	to remember
sabap	sabap	because
nanam	nanam	taste
bero	bilu	blue
binaning	binaning	yellow
badas	badas	to hit (body)
ma'na	mana	meaning
anad	anad	to learn
uman	uman	every
sampay	sampay	until
bau	baw	smell
mapakay	mapakay	be able to
sugat	sugat	to aim/to hit
kuyug	kuyung	to shake
sawpama	upama	example
tagad	tagad	to wait
tangub	takub	cave
patana	patana	to rest
subod	sebud	fat
budak	bedak	powder
masudi	masudi	judgemental
sudi	sudi	judgement
panik	panik	to climb
adapan	hadapan	in front
tagnok	tagenek	mosquito
sindo	sindul	dessert soup
anad	anad	artocarpus odoratissimus
pagutan	pageletan	between
umor	umul	age
amayka	amayka	if
darowaka	darwaka	disobedient
ungaya	ungaya	objective
pusaka	pusaka	inheritance
kanilan	kanilan	their
silan	silan	them
warna	warna	color
korit	kulit	orange
lambayong	lambayung	purple
kasomba	kasumba	pink
antap	antap	suspicion

== Culture ==
The Kalagans are self-sufficient farmers, producing nearly all of their own food. Wet-rice is grown in the lowlands, and dry-rice and corn are farmed in the upland areas. Yams and sweet potatoes are also staple crops. Vegetables such as tomatoes, squash, and beans are grown; coconuts abound and many kinds of fruit are available. Goats are raised for meat, and chickens are raised for both eggs and meat. In addition to farming, the Kalagans catch fish and obtain wild foods and other various materials from the marshes around them.

Those of highest rank in their society do not perform manual labor. Among the rest of the population, male/female division of labor is not very pronounced. Generally, men do the plowing, tilling, and other heavy farm work. The women do most of the domestic work, often assisted by their older children.

Traditional Kalagan art includes weaving, basketry, and various ornamental crafts. Personal adornment in the form of bright clothing, beaded jewelry, and other accessories is distinctive and colorful. On special occasions, graceful dances are performed to the rhythmic music of gongs and other instruments.

The Kalagan social structure is unusual because it is modified by a system of social rank, certain rules of descent, and distinctive marriage patterns. For most purposes, social rank is less important than blood ties. Higher-ranking families maintain elaborate genealogies to prove their claims of descent.

There is a strong preference for marriage between related families, especially marriage to second cousins. After marriage, the couple usually resides in the husband's community. Today, however, many young couples form their own independent households.

== See also ==
Kalagan language

- Mansakan languages

Davao Region

Caraga

Ethnic groups in the Philippines

- Lumad
