= Interdental consonant =

Consonant formed with tongue between the teeth

Interdental

◌̪͆
Image

Interdental consonants are produced by placing the tip of the tongue between the upper and lower front teeth. That differs from typical dental consonants, which are articulated with the tongue against the back of the upper incisors. No language is known to contrast interdental and dental consonants.

Interdental consonants may be transcribed with the extIPA subscript plus superscript bridge (⟨◌̪⟩ + ⟨◌͆⟩ = ⟨◌̪͆⟩), as in ⟨n̪͆ t̪͆ d̪͆ θ̪͆ ð̪͆ r̪͆ ɹ̪͆ l̪͆ ɬ̪͆ ɮ̪͆⟩, but it is also common to transcribe them as advanced dentals, as in ⟨n̪̟ t̪̟ d̪̟ θ̟ ð̟ r̪̟ ɹ̪̟ l̪̟ ɬ̪̟ ɮ̪̟⟩, or even as advanced alveolars, as in ⟨n̟ t̟ d̟ r̟ ɹ̟ l̟ ɬ̟ ɮ̟⟩.

Interdental consonants are rare cross-linguistically. Interdental realisations of otherwise-dental or alveolar consonants may occur as idiosyncrasies or as coarticulatory effects of a neighbouring interdental sound. The most commonly-occurring interdental consonants are the non-sibilant fricatives (sibilants may be dental but do not appear as interdentals, except for in disordered speech). No language is known to contrast interdentals with dentals of the same manner.

== Occurrence ==
Voiced and voiceless interdental fricatives [ð̟, θ̟] appear in American English as the initial sounds of words like 'then' and 'thin'. In British English, the consonants are more likely to be dental [ð, θ].

An interdental [l̟] occurs in some varieties of Italian, and it may also occur in some varieties of English though the distribution and the usage of interdental [l̟] in English are not clear.

Interdental approximants [ð̞] are found in about a dozen Philippine languages, including Kagayanen (Manobo branch), Karaga Mandaya (Mansakan branch), Kalagan (Mansakan branch), Southern Catanduanes Bicolano, and several varieties of Kalinga, as well as in the Bauchi languages of Nigeria. See voiced dental fricative for further description.

Interdental [ɮ̟] occurs in some dialects of Amis. Mapuche has interdental [n̟], [t̟], and [l̟].

In most Indigenous Australian languages, there is a series of "dental" consonants, written th, nh, and (in some languages) lh. They are always laminal (pronounced by touching with the blade of the tongue) but may be formed in one of three different ways, depending on the language, the speaker, and how carefully the speaker pronounces the sound. They are apical interdental [t̺͆~d̺͆ n̺͆ l̺͆] with the tip of the tongue visible between the teeth, as in th in American English; laminal interdental [t̻͆~d̻͆ n̻͆ l̻͆] with the tip of the tongue down behind the lower teeth, so that the blade is visible between the teeth; and denti-alveolar [t̻̪~d̻̪ n̻̪ l̻̪], that is, with both the tip and the blade making contact with the back of the upper teeth and alveolar ridge, as in French t, d, n, l.

== See also ==
- Bidental consonant
- Adyghe language
