= Mabini Protected Landscape and Seascape =

- IUCN category V (protected landscape/seascape)
- Location within Philippines
- Location: Davao de Oro, Philippines
- Nearest city: Tagum
- Coordinates: 7°17′25″N 125°50′32″E
- Area: 6,106 hectares (15,090 acres)
- Established: December 29, 1981 (Wilderness area); May 31, 2000 (Protected landscape/seascape)
- Governing body: Department of Environment and Natural Resources

The Mabini Protected Landscape and Seascape, in Davao de Oro, Philippines, is a terrestrial and marine protected area established in 2000 to protect ecologically significant habitats in Davao Gulf. The park extends along the coast of the municipality of Mabini from the mouth of the Pandasan River to the southern tip of Kopiat Island. It also includes Lunod Island, also known as Pandasan Island, which was earlier declared a wilderness area in 1981. It covers 6,106 hectares (15,090 acres) of extensive mangrove forests, white sand beaches and rich coral reef systems.

== Geography ==
The Mabini protected area is situated in the coastal villages of Cuambog, San Antonio, Pindasan, Cadunan and Tagnanan in the northeastern side of Davao Gulf, some 80 kilometers east of the regional capital Davao City. Its coast is characterized as generally flat and covered by San Miguel silty clay loam. It is lined by a good stand of mangrove forest, particularly along the shores of San Antonio and Pindasan. It is crossed by 9 rivers and creeks which drain into Davao Gulf, including the Lapinigan, Tagbalawlaw and Pindasan rivers.

The park also includes two small islands in Davao Gulf: the 47-hectare (120-acre) Kopiat Island and the 17-hectare (42-acre) Lunod Island. The islands contain stretches of white sand beaches with coconut and mangrove areas. In Kopiat Island, a 7-hectare (17-acre) lagoon can be found. The waters surrounding the islands are known as a coral diversity hotspot hosting 46 of the 72 known genera of Scleractina found in the Philippines.

Visitor facilities are provided at Kopiat Island, including resorts and cottages with comfort rooms and dressing rooms.

== Biodiversity ==
The Mabini portion of Davao Gulf is a feeding ground to 11 species of cetaceans such as sperm whales, killer whales and bottle-nosed dolphins. It also supports 5 marine turtle species including hawksbill turtles and leatherback turtles which lay their eggs on Kopiat Island.

Mangrove forests cover 72 hectares (180 acres) of the park, dominated by the Rhizophora apiculata variety. It provides habitat to the following bird species:

- Olive-backed sunbird
- Little tern
- Gray wagtail
- Little slaty flycatcher
- Coleto
- Philippine glossy starling
- White-collared kingfisher
- River kingfisher
- Yellow-vented bulbul
- Brown shrike
- Little mangrove heron
- Zebra dove
- Pink-necked green pigeon
- Pygmy swiftlet
- White-rumped swift
- Philippine spine-tailed swift
- Ashy minivet
- Wandering whistling-duck
- Tree sparrow
- Olive-capped flowerpecker
