= Davaoeño language =

Austronesian language spoken in the Philippines

Davaoeño
- Dabawenyo; Davaoeño
- Matino
- Native to: Philippines
- Region: Davao Region, Mindanao
- Native speakers: 150,000 (2005)
- Language family: Austronesian: Malayo-Polynesian; Philippine; Greater Central Philippine; Central Philippine; Mansakan; Davaoeño

Language codes
- ISO 639-3: daw
- Glottolog: dava1245

Davaoeño (Dabawenyo) is a language of the Davao Region of Mindanao in the Philippines. According to Zorc (1977), it is a native Mansakan language influenced by Cebuano and Tagalog. Traditionally, it was the principal language of the Davaoeño people, but it is no longer spoken in Davao City as speakers have shifted to a local dialect of the Cebuano language, called Davaoeño Cebuano (and often just called Davaoeño, Dabawenyo or Bisaya).

The Davaoeño language and Davaoeño Cebuano are also not to be confused with the extinct Davaoeño dialect of the Chavacano language that was once spoken in Davao (known as Chavacano Davaoeño or simply Davaoeño).
