= Tausug =

Tausug or Tausūg may refer to:

- Tausug language, Malayo-Polynesian language spoken mainly in the Philippines
  - Tausug alphabet
  - Tausūg people, speakers of the language
