= Mabini, Davao de Oro =

Municipality in Davao de Oro, Philippines

Mabini Doña Alicia
- Municipality
- Municipality of Mabini
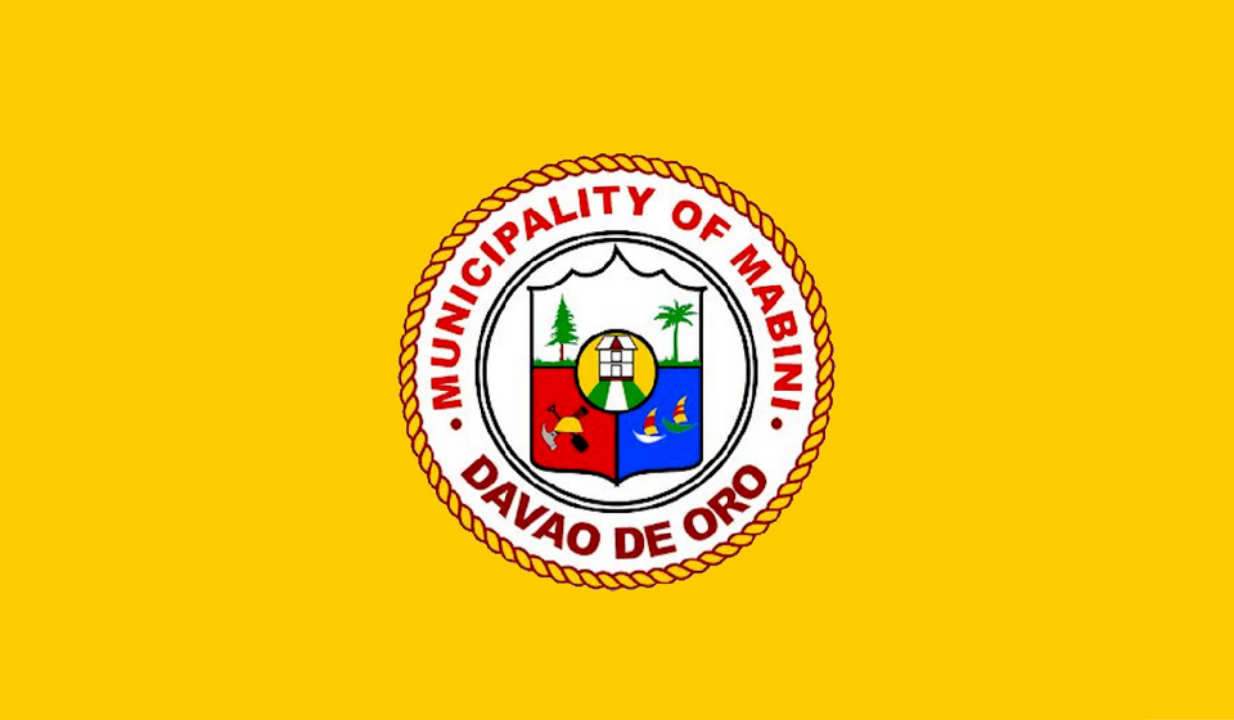
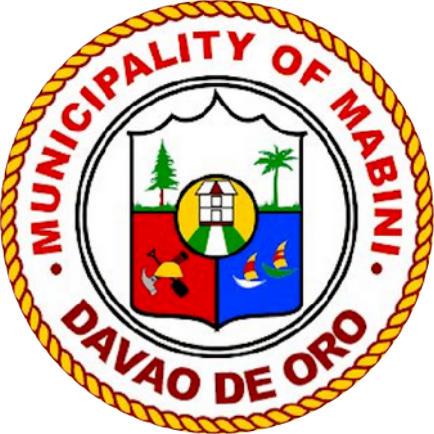
- Flag Seal
- Nickname: The Gold Coast
- Map of Davao de Oro with Mabini highlighted
- Interactive map of Mabini
- Location within the Philippines
- Coordinates: 7°18′33″N 125°51′20″E
- Country: Philippines
- Region: Davao Region
- Province: Davao de Oro
- District: 2nd district
- Founded: May 28, 1953
- Named for: Apolinario Mabini
- Barangays: 11 (see Barangays)

Government
  - Type: Sangguniang Bayan
  - Mayor: Emerson Luego
  - Vice Mayor: Halima Muñoz
  - Representative: Ruwel Peter S. Gonzaga
  - Electorate: 31,560 voters (2025)

Area
  - Total: 400.00 km^{2} (154.44 sq mi)
- Elevation: 72 m (236 ft)
- Highest elevation: 665 m (2,182 ft)
- Lowest elevation: 0 m (0 ft)

Population (2024 census)
  - Total: 43,971
  - Density: 109.93/km^{2} (284.71/sq mi)
  - Households: 10,434

Economy
  - Income class: 1st municipal income class
  - Poverty incidence: 14.49% (2023)
  - Revenue: ₱ 282.2 million (2024)
  - Assets: ₱ 672.6 million (2024)
  - Expenditure: ₱ 283 million (2024)
  - Liabilities: ₱ 170.3 million (2024)

Service provider
  - Electricity: Northern Davao Electric Cooperative (NORDECO)
- Time zone: UTC+8 (PST)
- ZIP code: 8807
- PSGC: 1108203000
- IDD : area code: +63 (0)87
- Native languages: Davawenyo; Cebuano; Kalagan; Mansaka; Tagalog; Ata Manobo

Mabini, officially the Municipality of Mabini (Cebuano: Lungsod sa Mabini; Tagalog: Bayan ng Mabini), is a municipality in the province of Davao de Oro, Philippines. According to the 2024 census, it had a population of 43,971.

The municipality is the location of the Mabini Protected Landscape and Seascape. It was formerly known as Cuambog and Doña Alicia.

== History ==
The first people to occupy the area now known as Mabini were the Mansakas.

The settlement was formerly known as Cuambog, named after a tree species of the family Dilleniaceae.

On May 28, 1953, by virtue of Executive Order No. 596 of President Elpidio Quirino, the municipality of Mabini was created from the eastern part of Tagum and the northern part of Pantukan. The municipality was originally part of the undivided province of Davao. Barrio Cuambog became the seat of the municipal government. The municipality was named Doña Alicia after President Quirino's wife Alicia Syquía, who was killed by Japanese soldiers during the Second World War. In 1954, the municipality was renamed in honor of revolutionary leader Apolinario Mabini.

Mabini became part of Davao del Norte when Davao province was split on May 8, 1967. On June 17, 1967, the municipality of Maco was created from the northern barangays of Mabini.

In 1998, Mabini became part of Compostela Valley, a new province that separated from Davao del Norte. Compostela Valley was renamed Davao de Oro in 2019.

== Geography ==
=== Barangays ===
Mabini is politically subdivided into 11 barangays. Each barangay consists of puroks while some have sitios.

In 1957, the sitios of Panibasan Proper and Andili became barrio Panibasan (Pindasan), the sitios of Cadunan Proper, Anislagan, Malabatuan and Lapinigan became barrio Cadunan, and the sitios of Tangnanan Proper, Mampising and Tagbalabao became barrio Tangnanan.

- Cadunan
- Pindasan
- Cuambog (Poblacion)
- Tagnanan (Mampising)
- Anitapan
- Cabuyuan
- Del Pilar
- Libodon
- Golden Valley (Maraut)
- Pangibiran
- San Antonio

=== Climate ===
Climate data for Mabini
Month	Jan	Feb	Mar	Apr	May	Jun	Jul	Aug	Sep	Oct	Nov	Dec	Year
Mean daily maximum °C (°F)	29 (84)	30 (86)	30 (86)	31 (88)	31 (88)	30 (86)	30 (86)	30 (86)	30 (86)	30 (86)	30 (86)	30 (86)	30 (86)
Mean daily minimum °C (°F)	22 (72)	22 (72)	22 (72)	23 (73)	24 (75)	24 (75)	24 (75)	24 (75)	24 (75)	24 (75)	23 (73)	22 (72)	23 (74)
Average precipitation mm (inches)	98 (3.9)	86 (3.4)	91 (3.6)	83 (3.3)	133 (5.2)	158 (6.2)	111 (4.4)	101 (4.0)	94 (3.7)	117 (4.6)	131 (5.2)	94 (3.7)	1,297 (51.2)
Average rainy days	16.4	14.3	16.3	18.5	25.3	25.0	23.8	21.9	20.8	24.4	24.3	18.7	249.7
Source: Meteoblue

== Demographics ==
Population census of Mabini
Year	Pop.	±% p.a.
1960	20,153	—
1970	18,343	−0.94%
1975	26,194	+7.41%
1980	16,517	−8.81%
1990	24,433	+3.99%
1995	29,548	+3.63%
2000	32,058	+1.76%
2007	35,308	+1.34%
2010	36,807	+1.52%
2015	41,102	+2.12%
2020	43,552	+1.23%
2024	43,971	+0.23%
Source: Philippine Statistics Authority

In the 2024 census, the population of Mabini was 43,971 people, with a density of 110 inhabitants per square kilometre or 280 inhabitants per square mile.

== Economy ==
Poverty incidence of Mabini (%)

Source: Philippine Statistics Authority

== See also ==
- List of renamed cities and municipalities in the Philippines
