= Davao de Oro =

Province in Davao Region, Philippines

Davao de Oro Compostela Valley
- Province
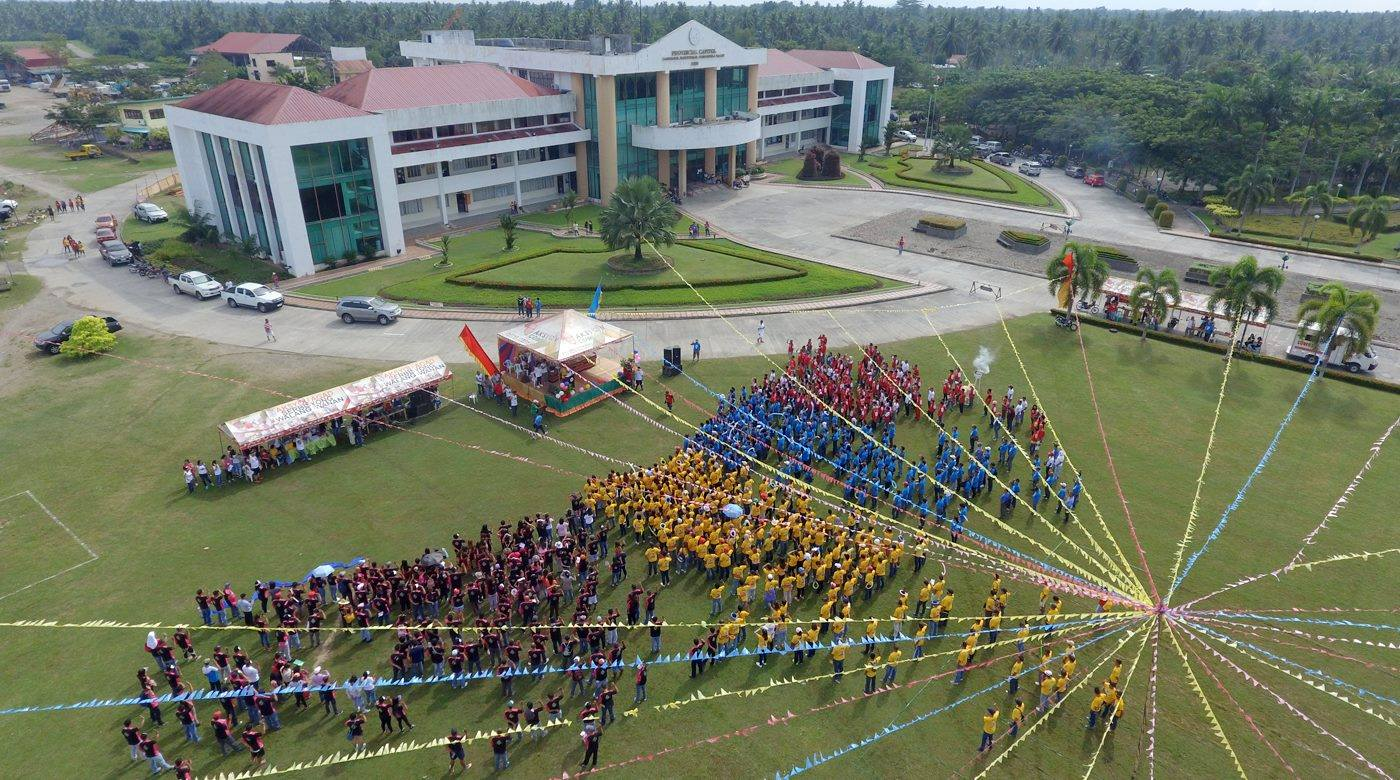
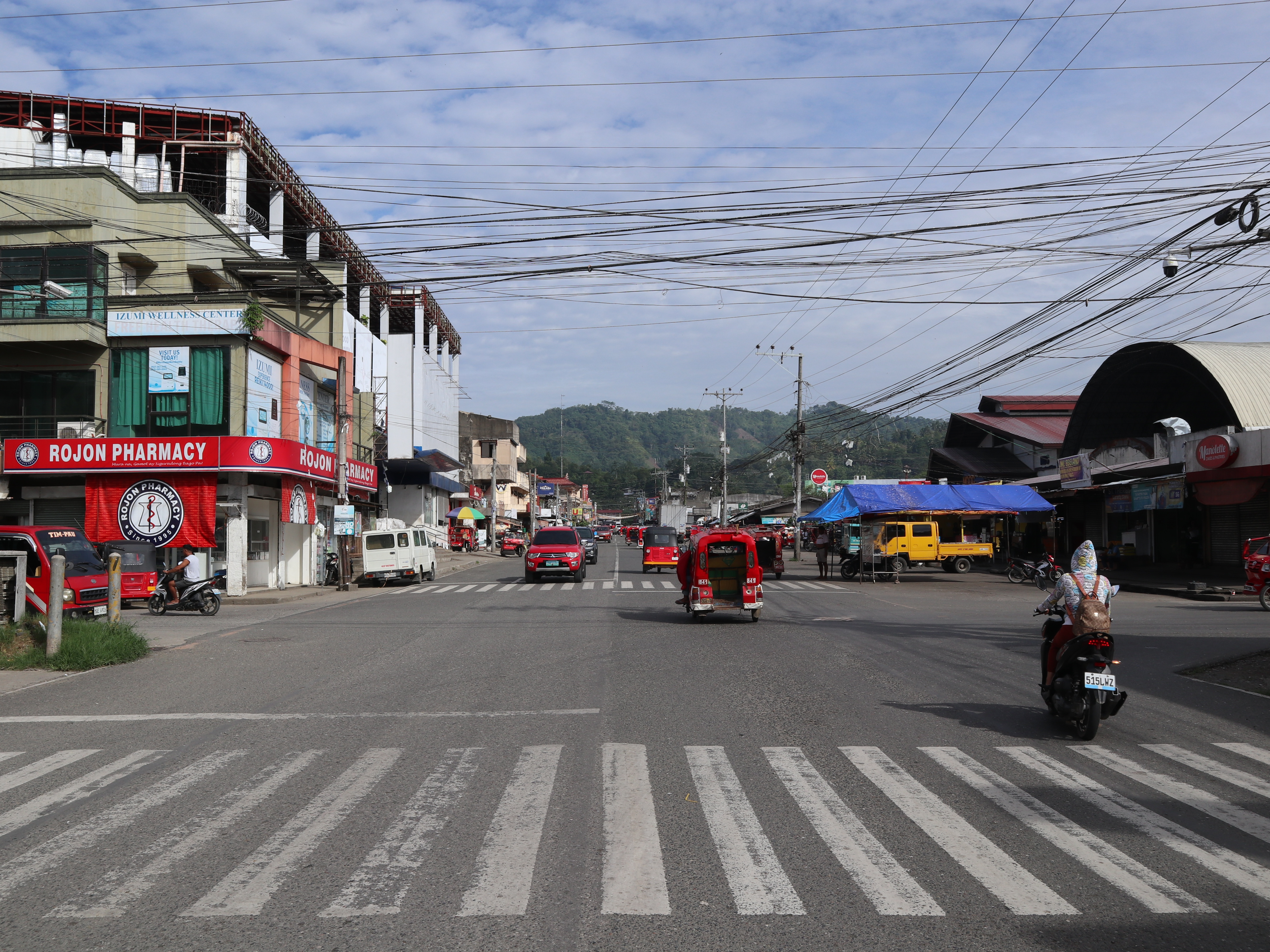
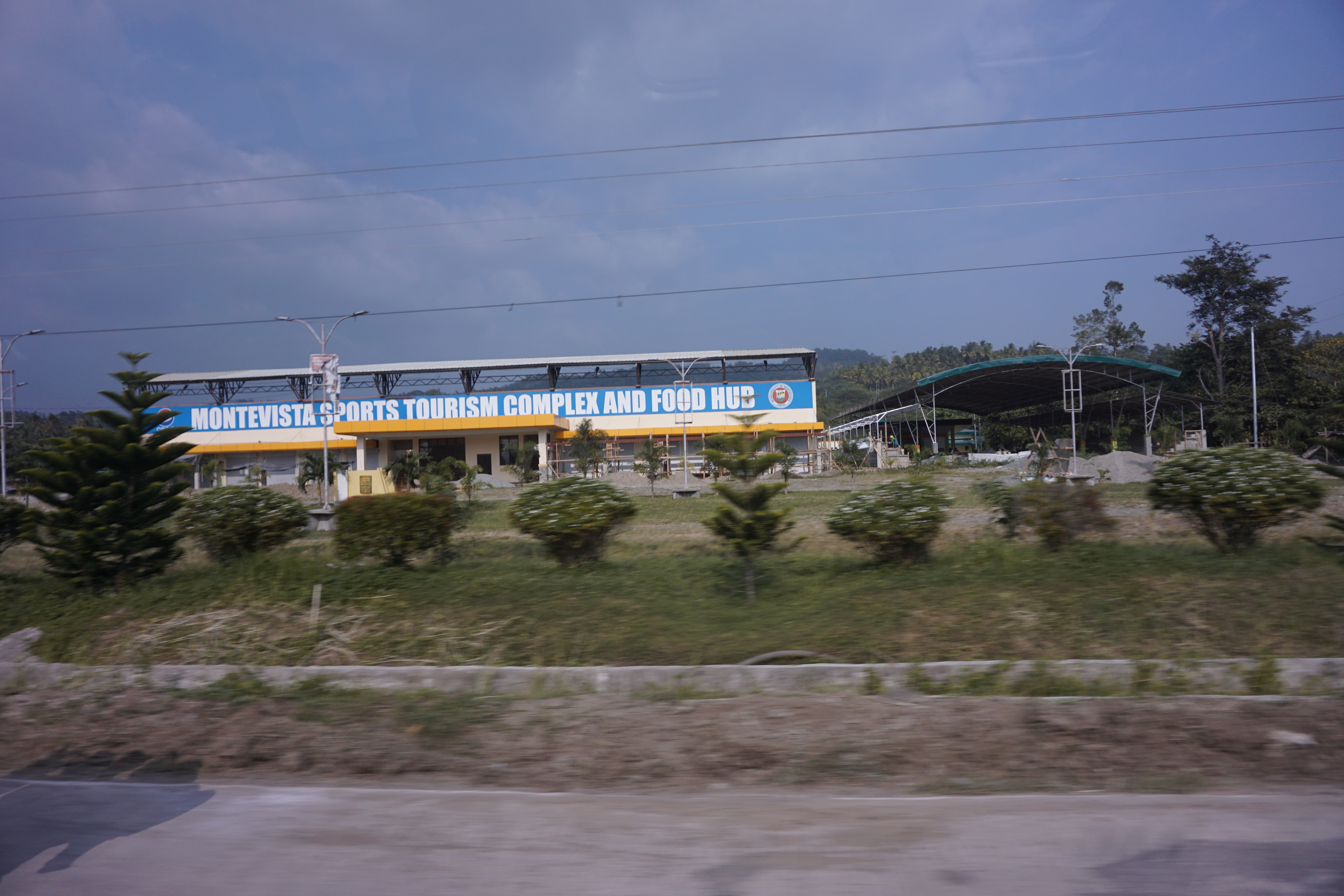
- (from top: left to right) Provincial Capitol, Nabunturan Poblacion and Montevista Sports Complex.

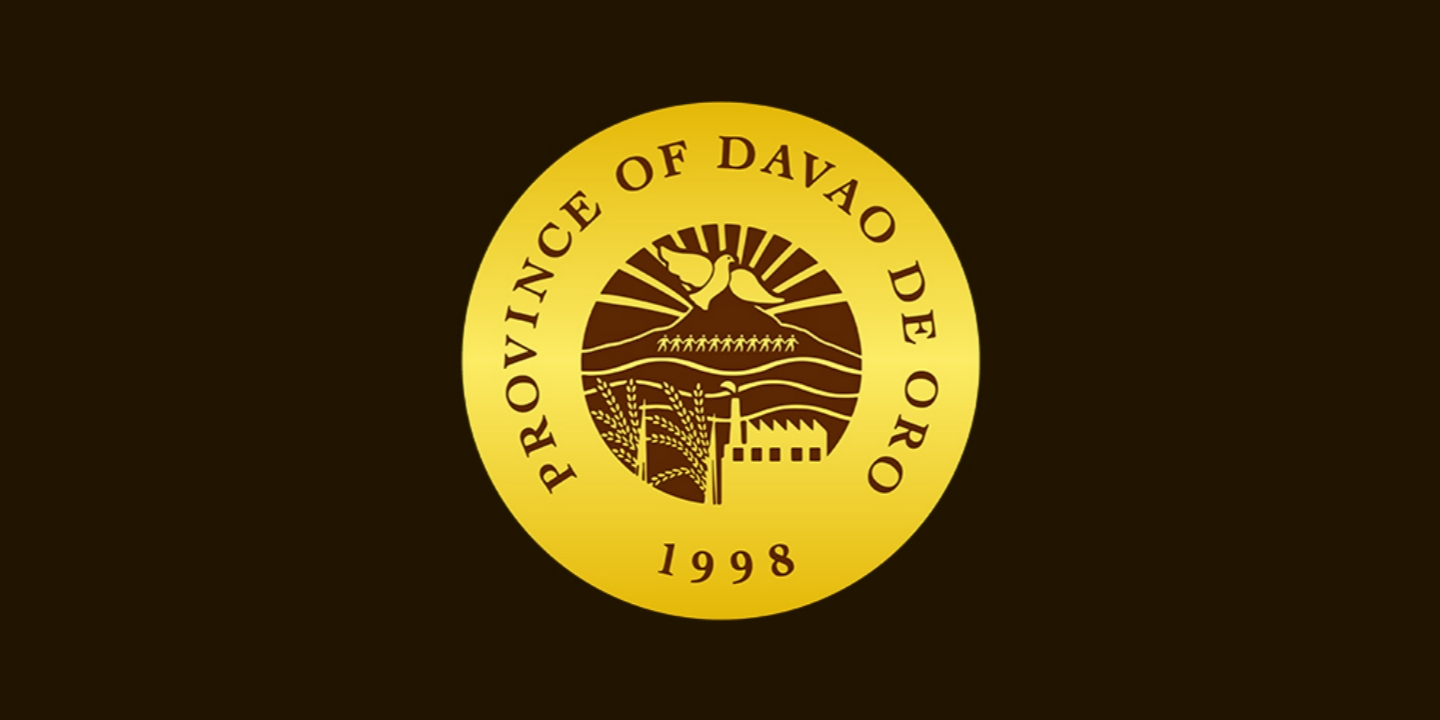
- Flag Seal
- Etymology: Davao de Oro (lit., "Golden Davao")
- Nickname: Golden Capital of the Philippines
- Map of Davao Region with Davao de Oro highlighted
- Interactive map of Davao de Oro
- Coordinates: 7°36′N 125°57′E
- Country: Philippines
- Region: Davao Region
- Founded: March 8, 1998
- Renamed: December 7, 2019
- Capital: Nabunturan
- Largest Municipality: Monkayo

Government
  - Governor: Raul G. Mabanglo (Lakas-CMD)
  - Vice Governor: Dorothy Montejo-Gonzaga (PFP)
  - Legislature: Davao de Oro Provincial Board
  - Electorate: 548,390 voters (2025)

Area
  - Total: 4,560.09 km^{2} (1,760.66 sq mi)
  - Rank: 26th out of 82
- Highest elevation (Mt.Pandadagsaan): 2,670 m (8,760 ft)

Population (2024 census)
  - Total: 783,775
  - Rank: 40th out of 82
  - Density: 171.877/km^{2} (445.160/sq mi)
  - Rank: 53rd out of 82
  - Households: 188,918
- Demonym(s): Orocanon, Oroqueño

Divisions
  - Independent cities: 0
  - Component cities: 0
  - Municipalities: 11: Compostela; Laak; Mabini; Maco; Maragusan; Mawab; Monkayo; Montevista; Nabunturan; New Bataan; Pantukan
  - Barangays: 237
  - Districts: Legislative districts of Davao de Oro

Economy
  - Income class: 1st provincial income class
  - Poverty incidence: 7.1% (2023)
  - Revenue: ₱ 4,079 million (2024)
  - Assets: ₱ 23,355 million (2024)
  - Expenditure: ₱ 3,899 million (2024)
  - Liabilities: ₱ 1,794 million (2024)
- Time zone: UTC+8 (PST)
- PSGC: 1108200000
- IDD : area code: +63 (0)87
- ISO 3166 code: PH-COM
- Spoken languages: Cebuano; Mansaka; Ata Manobo; Mandaya; Filipino; English
- Website: www.davaodeoro.gov.ph

Davao de Oro, officially the Province of Davao de Oro (Cebuano: Lalawigan sa Davao de Oro; Filipino: Lalawigan ng Davao de Oro), is a province in the Philippines located in the Davao Region in Mindanao. Its capital is Nabunturan while Monkayo is the most populous. It used to be part of the province of Davao del Norte until it was made a separate province in 1998.

The province borders Davao del Norte to the west, Agusan del Sur to the north, and Davao Oriental to the east. To the southwest lies the Davao Gulf. The first elected governor was Jose Caballero, formerly a lawyer for a mining group in the province. It was formerly known as Compostela Valley (shortened to ComVal; Cebuano: Kawalogang Kompostela) from its inception until December 2019, when a plebiscite ratified the law that proposed to rename the province to Davao de Oro.

== History ==
Historical affiliations

Spain 1848–1898
United States of America 1898–1942
Japan 1942–1945
United States of America 1945–1946
Philippines 1946–present

Davao de Oro, the 78th province in the country, was created out of Davao del Norte Province by virtue of Republic Act No. 8470, signed by President Fidel V. Ramos on January 30, 1998. The new province was officially named Compostela Valley. On March 7 of the same year, the law was ratified through a plebiscite conducted in the eleven (11) municipalities of the mother province.

The movement to create a new province by dividing Davao del Norte started in the 1980s during the term of Congressman Lorenzo Sarmiento, the author of RA No. 6430. However, this was not realized until his death in the late 1980s. His son, Rogelio M. Sarmiento, succeeded him in Congress and pushed for the passage of the bill creating the province.

Upon consultation with the governor of Davao del Norte, Prospero S. Amatong, the province's other two legislators, 3rd District Congressman Rodolfo P. Del Rosario and 2nd District Congressman Baltazar A. Sator, and other provincial and municipal officials, it was decided that the addition of four municipalities, namely Maco, Mabini, Pantukan, and Laak to the proposed province would be the most ideal and equitable configuration as this would make both provinces on an almost equal footing in terms of area, population, and development opportunities. It was also decided that Nabunturan would be the capital town because of its more central location.

The name originally proposed for the province was Davao del Norte, the former name, or so it was thought, of the mother province. However, the House of Representatives’ Reference and Research Bureau, which conducted the research and legal work on the creation of the province, found out that the mother province continues to be officially referred to as Davao del Norte in most official documents including the 1987 Philippine Constitution despite the passage of RA No. 6430 on June 17, 1972, renaming it as Davao Province. Tedious technical and legal issues needed to be resolved before the name could be adopted. The proposal was thus shelved and the name finally agreed upon was Compostela Valley, referring to the great fertile plain in the heartland of the province.

The origin of the province's inhabitants came from the ethnic tribes of the Mansaka, Mandaya, Manobo, Mangguangan, Dibabawon, Aeta, Kamayo, Davaweño and Kalagan. Similar to the history of other Mindanao provinces, most of the present populations of the province are descendants of migrants who came from Luzon and Visayas islands during the pre-war and post war eras, among the Luzon migrants were Tagalogs from Bataan (thus, the town New Bataan) & Ilocanos from North Central Luzon. The bigger wave of immigrants came during the time of President Ramon Magsaysay wherein the policy of attraction adopted by the national government was to offer parcels of land to tenant-farmers. Although a virtual melting pot, the Visayans (mostly Cebuano-speaking) are the dominant group in Davao de Oro.

Upon its establishment, Davao de Oro was ruled by a succession of three governors during the first four months of its existence. The first governor of the province was Prospero S. Amatong, the three-term governor (1986–1998) of the then undivided province of Davao del Norte, who held the position only for a day. As the law creating the new province allowed incumbent elected officials of Davao del Norte the option to serve the remainder of their term in Compostela Valley, Amatong took this option and assumed the governorship of the then-Compostela Valley on March 26, 1998. The following day, he resigned and filed his candidacy for the congressional seat of the 2nd district of the new province. The governorship was turned over to Luz M. Sarmiento, by virtue of a presidential appointment. Sarmiento, the wife of then Congressman Lorenzo Sarmiento served the province from March 27, 1998, to June 30, 1998. She was succeeded by Jose R. Caballero.

Jose R. Caballero, a practicing lawyer and former vice governor of then undivided Davao del Norte (1988–1992) was the first elected governor of Compostela Valley.

Arturo T. "Chiongkee" Uy is the fourth governor of Compostela Valley. He first served the province as member of the 3rd Sangguniang Panlalawigan of Compostela Valley (2004–2007) before he was elected as governor in the May 2007 national and local elections. He was reelected unopposed during the May 2010 national and local elections.

In 1955, the barrio (barangay) of New Sabonga was transferred to the municipality of Compostela from the municipality of Asuncion.

On June 23, 1957, then President Carlos P. Garcia signed Republic Act No. 2038 which separated Compostela from Nabunturan. The first Mayor appointed by President Carlos P. Garcia was then Mayor Pio P. Galenzoga, one of the pioneer settlers.

In the same year the sitios of Kao, Magkagong, Margosan, Matilo, Magangit, Cabacungan, Tigbatinao and Camanlangan were constituted into a barrio known as Santo Niño.

At the time, Compostela was an incongruous mixture of wooden-roofed houses concentrated along the Agusan River which was properly known as "dungguanan" (embarkation). This area later became its center of trade and commerce or Poblacion.

=== Change of name ===
A Senate bill officially renaming Compostela Valley to Davao de Oro was passed in 2019. Provincial officials led by Governor Jayvee Tyron Uy justified the renaming as part of an clear up confusion with its geographic location, with the province's name sometimes associated with Cagayan Valley and the town of Compostela in Cebu, and associate it further with fellow provinces in the Davao Region. The plebiscite was held on December 7, 2019, with the majority of participants voting in favor of the name change.

== Geography ==
Davao de Oro covers a total area of 4,479.77 square kilometres (1,729.65 sq mi) occupying the northeastern section of the Davao Region. The province borders Davao del Norte to the west, Agusan del Sur to the north, and Davao Oriental to the east. To the southwest lies Davao Gulf.

=== Administrative divisions ===
Davao de Oro is divided into 2 districts comprising 11 municipalities.

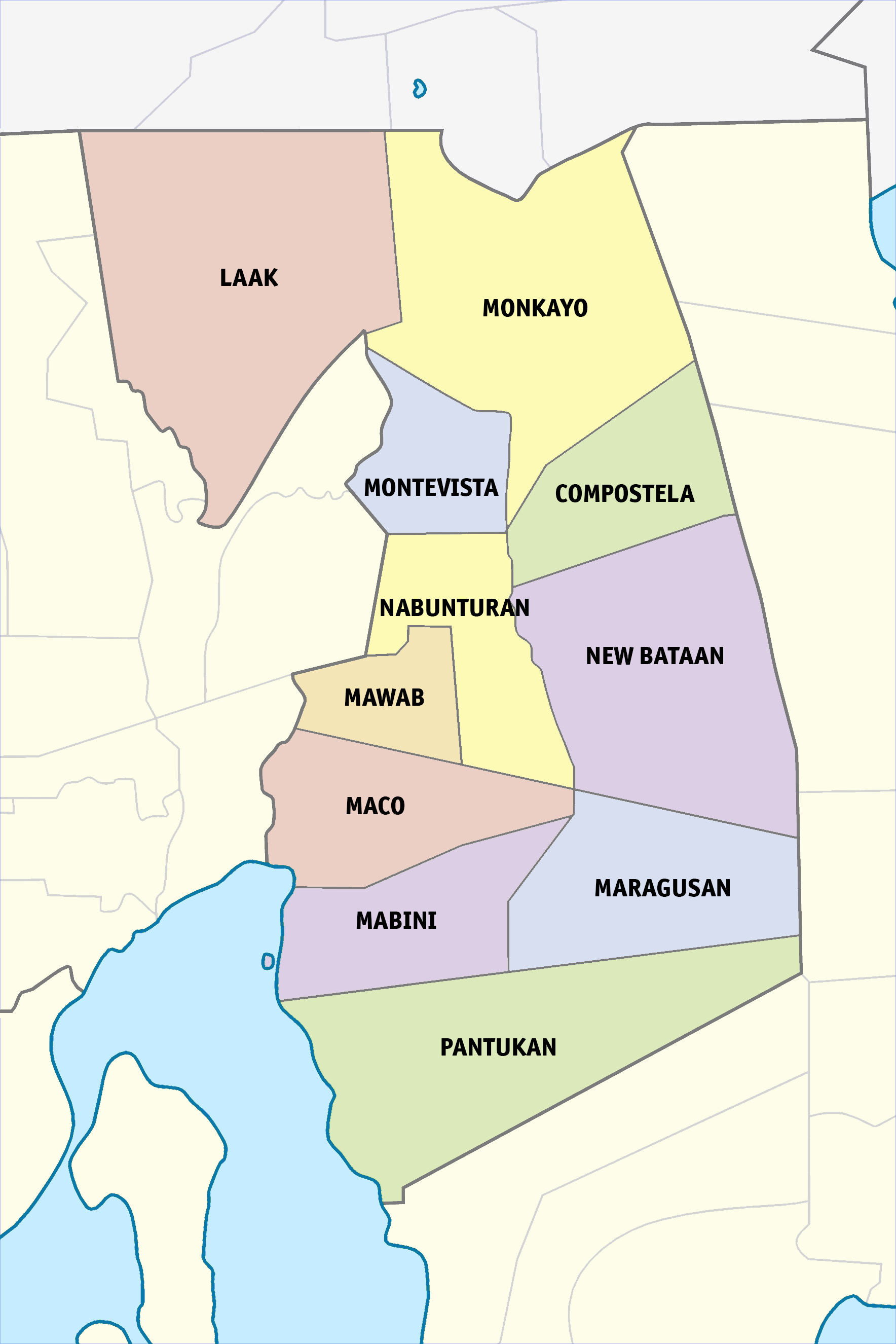
Political map of Davao de Oro

† Provincial capital

Municipality		Creation	District	Population			±% p.a.	Area		Density		Barangay	Coordinates^{[A]}
				(2020)		(2015)		km^{2}	sq mi	/km^{2}	/sq mi		
Compostela		August 1, 1948	1st	11.7%	89,884	87,474	+0.52%	287.00	110.81	310	800	16	7°40′06″N 126°05′03″E
Laak		April 4, 1979	2nd	10.4%	79,744	73,874	+1.47%	768.00	296.53	100	260	40	7°49′04″N 125°47′22″E
Mabini		May 28, 1953	2nd	5.7%	43,552	41,102	+1.11%	400.00	154.44	110	280	11	7°18′30″N 125°51′12″E
Maco		June 17, 1967	2nd	10.8%	83,237	81,277	+0.45%	342.23	132.14	240	620	37	7°21′45″N 125°51′28″E
Maragusan		November 25, 1977	1st	8.4%	64,412	60,842	+1.09%	394.27	152.23	160	410	24	7°19′01″N 126°07′33″E
Mawab		August 14, 1959	2nd	5.2%	39,631	37,065	+1.28%	136.10	52.55	290	750	11	7°30′27″N 125°55′15″E
Monkayo		September 14, 1954	1st	12.2%	93,937	94,908	−0.20%	609.61	235.37	150	390	21	7°49′57″N 126°03′23″E
Montevista		June 18, 1966	1st	6.1%	46,558	43,706	+1.21%	225.00	86.87	210	540	20	7°42′11″N 125°59′18″E
Nabunturan	†	July 23, 1957	2nd	11.0%	84,340	82,234	+0.48%	231.30	89.31	360	930	28	7°36′08″N 125°58′07″E
New Bataan		June 18, 1968	1st	6.7%	51,466	47,726	+1.45%	553.15	213.57	93	240	16	7°32′54″N 126°08′16″E
Pantukan		November 13, 1936	2nd	11.8%	90,786	85,899	+1.06%	533.11	205.83	170	440	13	7°07′53″N 125°53′50″E
Total					767,547	736,107	+0.80%	4,479.77	1,729.65	170	440	237	(see GeoGroup box)
1. Coordinates mark the town center, and are sortable by latitude.

== Demographics ==
Population census of Davao de Oro
Year	Pop.	±% p.a.
1918	13,060	—
1939	21,048	+2.30%
1948	26,883	+2.76%
1960	102,830	+11.83%
1970	184,831	+6.03%
1975	235,293	+4.96%
1980	319,490	+6.31%
1990	466,286	+3.85%
1995	520,110	+2.07%
2000	580,244	+2.37%
2007	637,366	+1.30%
2010	687,195	+2.78%
2015	736,107	+1.32%
2020	767,547	+0.88%
2024	783,775	+0.50%
Source: Philippine Statistics Authority

The population of Davao de Oro in the 2024 census was 783,775 people, with a density of 170 inhabitants per square kilometre or 440 inhabitants per square mile.

The majority of the inhabitants are migrants from Cebu, Samar, Bohol and other Visayan provinces. The cultural minorities in the province include the Kalagan, Mansaka, Mandaya, Dibabawon, Mangguangan and Manobo groups such as the Atta, Talaingod, Langilan, and Matigsalug Manobo.

Arnold Bajo is the most successful defender of the poor minorities, especially the Mandayas. He died in a battle while defending the poor. According to legends, 40 days after his death, his bodily spirit was infused into the statue of Ara-Araba, the local tribe's god of harvest. From then on, he was worshipped as a god by the members of the Mandaya tribe.

=== Language ===
The primary language spoken in the province is Cebuano. Secondary languages include Kalagan, Mansaka, Mandaya, Ata Manobo, Dibabawnon, Tagalog, and English.

=== Religion ===
==== Catholicism ====
Roman Catholicism is the predominant religion of this province forming 74% of the province population.

==== Others ====
Other significant religious minorities include Protestants which form 15% of the province population and Iglesia ni Cristo which form 2% of the province population. Other religions are divided between Sunni Islam and Animism.

== Economy ==
Poverty incidence of Davao de Oro (%)

Source: Philippine Statistics Authority

Davao de Oro was billed as the second richest province in the Philippines by the Commission on Audit by year 2017. That year, its provincial government posted a record high of ₱18.75 billion worth of assets, the largest in whole Mindanao. As of 2019, with an increase to ₱20.099 billion worth of assets, it remains the richest province in Mindanao. The economic drive which brought the province to this status was caused by numerous business establishments, banana plantations, and vast gold and silver mines across the province, further augmented with its up-to-date transportation infrastructure.

The province possesses one of the largest gold deposits in the Philippines, with 10 out of its 11 towns having one or more gold mines, the largest of which is at Mt. Diwalwal in the town of Monkayo. The town of Nabunturan, the provincial capital, is also home to the biggest gold ring in the Philippines, "The Solidarity Ring."

The main sources of livelihood in the province are agricultural products such as rice, coconut, cacao, coffee, papaya, mango, pineapple, durian and banana. Some residents in the province have fishponds and culture their own fish like tilapia and milkfish.

== Government ==
Davao de Oro is headed by its governor as the chief executive. The vice governor is the presiding officer of the Sangguniang Panlalawigan ng Davao de Oro, the province's legislature. Each municipality elects its own mayor, and a vice mayor presiding its Sangguniang Bayan.

The province is represented by two representatives in the House of Representatives of the Philippines, each coming from a congressional district.

The province's Regional Trial Court meets in Nabunturan. It has one branch under the Eleventh Judicial Region.

- Governor: Justice Dorothy Gonzaga (Reporma)
- Vice governor: Jayvee Tyron Uy (Hugpong ng Pagbabago)
- Board members:
  - First district:
    - Kol Herv Zamora-Apsay (Hugpong ng Pagbabago)
    - Atty Dyud Lopoz (Hugpong ng Pagbabago)
    - Willy Ang (Hugpong ng Pagbabago)
    - Renato Basañes (Hugpong ng Pagbabago)
    - Eutropio Jayectin (Hugpong ng Pagbabago)
  - Second district:
    - Rowena Gonzaga (PDP-Laban)
    - Kristine Caballero-Rañon (Hugpong ng Pagbabago)
    - Vivencia Secuya (Hugpong ng Pagbabago)
    - Raul Caballero (Hugpong ng Pagbabago)
    - Bebot Arancon (IND)
  - Ex officio members:
    - Raul Timogtimog
    - Jammaila Budac (Hugpong ng Pagbabago)
    - Charlemagne Bautista
  - Sectoral member:
    - Albert Camana
