= Boston, Davao Oriental =

Municipality in Davao Oriental, Philippines

Boston
- Municipality
- Municipality of Boston
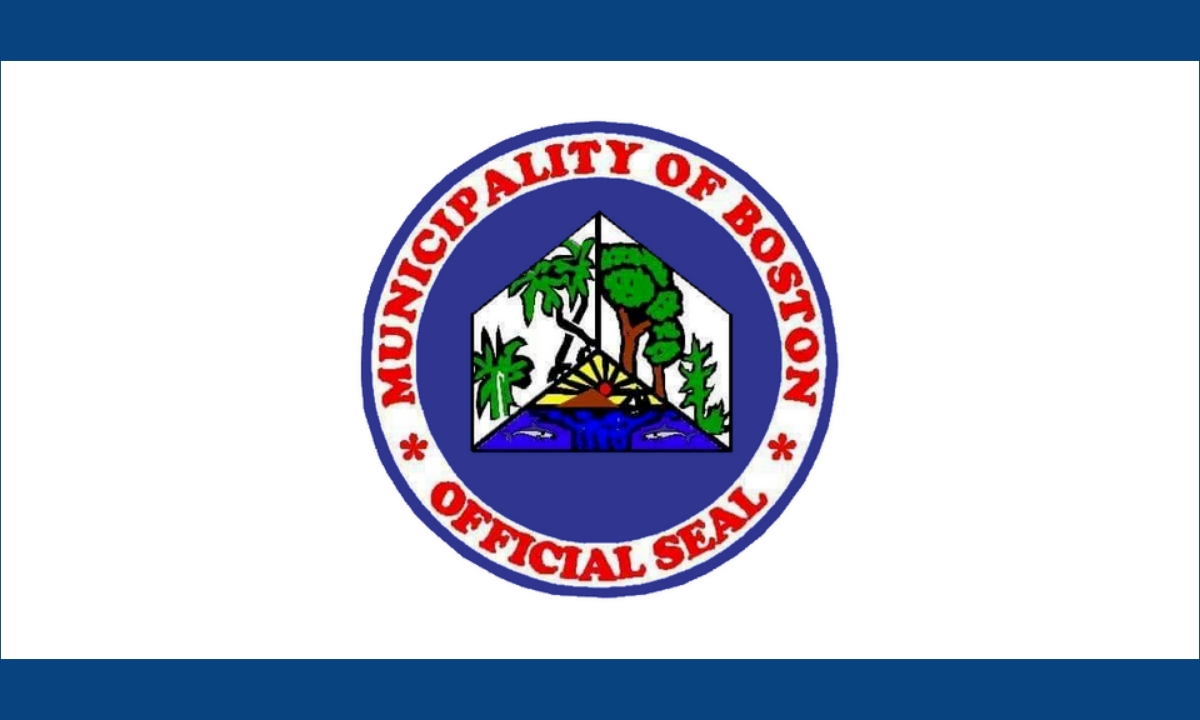
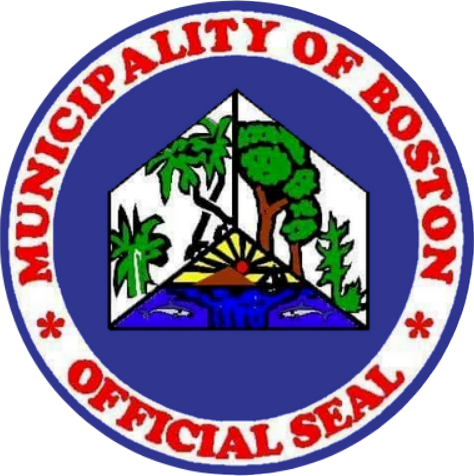
- Flag Seal

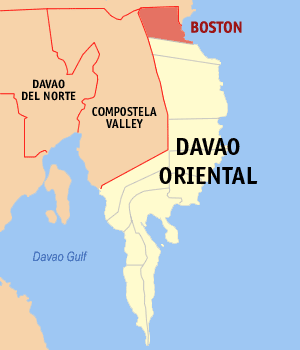
- Map of Davao Oriental with Boston highlighted
- Interactive map of Boston
- Location within the Philippines
- Coordinates: 7°52′11″N 126°22′34″E
- Country: Philippines
- Region: Davao Region
- Province: Davao Oriental
- District: 1st district
- Founded: June 21, 1969
- Named for: Boston, Massachusetts
- Barangays: 8 (see Barangays)

Government
  - Type: Sangguniang Bayan
  - Mayor: Rowell F. Rosit
  - Vice Mayor: Eleuterio C. Manaytay
  - Representative: Corazon N. Malanyaon
  - Municipal Council: Members: Rosalinda A. Adalim; Revelyn F. Rosit; Nilo B. Rosit; Kristoffer R. Pagaduan; Rommel G. Pawaon; John Paul C. Lampig; Amie B. Monredondo; Menith C. Castillones
  - Electorate: 11,497 voters (2025)

Area
  - Total: 357.03 km^{2} (137.85 sq mi)
- Elevation: 279 m (915 ft)
- Highest elevation: 1,629 m (5,344 ft)
- Lowest elevation: 0 m (0 ft)

Population (2024 census)
  - Total: 15,074
  - Density: 42.221/km^{2} (109.35/sq mi)
  - Households: 3,596
- Demonym: Bostonian

Economy
  - Income class: 2nd municipal income class
  - Poverty incidence: 37.93% (2023)
  - Revenue: ₱ 179.3 million (2024)
  - Assets: ₱ 461.9 million (2024)
  - Expenditure: ₱ 178.5 million (2024)
  - Liabilities: ₱ 238.5 million (2024)

Service provider
  - Electricity: Davao Oriental Electric Cooperative (DORECO)
- Time zone: UTC+8 (PST)
- ZIP code: 8206
- PSGC: 1102503000
- IDD : area code: +63 (0)87
- Native languages: Davawenyo; Surigaonon; Cebuano; Kalagan; Kamayo; Tagalog
- Website: www.boston.gov.ph

Boston ([ˈboston]), officially the Municipality of Boston (Kamayo: Lungsod ng Boston), is a municipality in the province of Davao Oriental, Philippines. According to the 2024 census, it has a population of 15,074 people.

It is the northernmost and least populated municipality in Davao Oriental.

== Etymology ==
Boston is named after Boston, Massachusetts, whose name in turn derives from the English locality where it originated. The municipality was likely established during the American period; however, historical records of its founding are said to have been lost during World War II.

== Geography ==
=== Climate ===
Boston has a tropical rainforest climate (Af) with heavy to very heavy rainfall year-round and with extremely heavy rainfall in January.

Climate data for Boston
Month	Jan	Feb	Mar	Apr	May	Jun	Jul	Aug	Sep	Oct	Nov	Dec	Year
Mean daily maximum °C (°F)	29.7 (85.5)	29.7 (85.5)	30.7 (87.3)	31.5 (88.7)	31.8 (89.2)	31.6 (88.9)	31.5 (88.7)	31.8 (89.2)	32.0 (89.6)	31.7 (89.1)	31.2 (88.2)	30.3 (86.5)	31.1 (88.0)
Daily mean °C (°F)	25.7 (78.3)	25.7 (78.3)	26.4 (79.5)	27.0 (80.6)	27.4 (81.3)	27.1 (80.8)	26.9 (80.4)	27.2 (81.0)	27.3 (81.1)	27.1 (80.8)	26.8 (80.2)	26.2 (79.2)	26.7 (80.1)
Mean daily minimum °C (°F)	21.8 (71.2)	21.8 (71.2)	22.1 (71.8)	22.6 (72.7)	23.0 (73.4)	22.7 (72.9)	22.4 (72.3)	22.6 (72.7)	22.6 (72.7)	22.6 (72.7)	22.4 (72.3)	22.2 (72.0)	22.4 (72.3)
Average rainfall mm (inches)	756 (29.8)	550 (21.7)	499 (19.6)	337 (13.3)	241 (9.5)	130 (5.1)	123 (4.8)	107 (4.2)	111 (4.4)	191 (7.5)	296 (11.7)	639 (25.2)	3,980 (156.8)
Source: Climate-Data.org

=== Barangays ===
Boston is politically subdivided into 8 barangays. Each barangay consists of puroks while some have sitios.

- Caatihan
- Cabasagan
- Carmen
- Cauwayanan
- Poblacion
- San Jose
- Sibajay
- Simulao

== Demographics ==
Population census of Boston
Year	Pop.	±% p.a.
1970	5,321	—
1975	6,111	+2.82%
1980	9,660	+9.59%
1990	9,917	+0.26%
1995	10,424	+0.94%
2000	10,266	−0.33%
2007	11,176	+1.18%
2010	12,670	+4.67%
2015	13,535	+1.27%
2020	14,618	+1.63%
2024	15,074	+0.74%
Source: Philippine Statistics Authority

== Economy ==
Poverty incidence of Boston (%)

Source: Philippine Statistics Authority
