= Mamanwa language =

Austronesian language

Mamanwa
- Native to: Philippines
- Region: Agusan del Norte and Surigao provinces, Mindanao
- Native speakers: (5,200 cited 1990 census)
- Language family: Austronesian: Malayo-Polynesian; Philippine; Greater Central Philippine; Central Philippine; Mansakan; Mamanwa
- Writing system: Latin

Language codes
- ISO 639-3: mmn
- Glottolog: mama1275

The Mamanwa language is a Central Philippine language spoken by the Mamanwa people. It is spoken in the provinces of Agusan del Norte and Surigao del Norte in the Lake Mainit area of Mindanao, Philippines. It had about 5,000 speakers in 1990.

Mamanwa is a grammatically conservative language, retaining a three-way deictic distinction in its articles which elsewhere is only preserved in some of the Batanic languages.

Before the arrival of Mamanwa speakers in central Samar Island, there had been an earlier group of Negritos on the island. According to Lobel (2013), the Samar Agta may have switched to Waray or Northern Samarenyo, or possibly even Mamanwa.

In addition to this, Francisco Combes, a Spanish friar, had observed the presence of Negritos in the Zamboanga Peninsula "in the Misamis strip" in 1645, although no linguistic data had ever been collected. The traditional Mamanwas believe in Tahaw as their supreme deity who is given prayers of supplications and petitions, as well as True, a deity of the forest and herder of hunting animals.

== Phonology ==
=== Consonants ===
		Labial	Alveolar	Palatal	Velar	Glottal
Nasal		m	n		ŋ	
Plosive	voiceless	p	t		k	ʔ
Plosive	voiced	b	d		ɡ	
Fricative	voiceless		s			h
Fricative	voiced		z			
Trill			r			
Lateral			l			
Approximant		w		j		

/r/ can be heard as a flap [ɾ] or a trill [r] in free variation.

/z/ may also be heard as [ʒ] in free variation, and even as [dʒ] when occurring after /d/ or in free variation with the allophone [ʒ].

=== Vowels ===
	Front	Central	Back
Close	i	ɨ	
Mid			o
Open		a	

== General references ==
- Lobel, Jason William (2013). Philippine and North Bornean Languages: Issues in Description, Subgrouping, and Reconstruction (PDF) (Ph.D. dissertation). University of Hawai'i at Manoa.
- Miller, Jeanne; Miller, Helen (1976). Mamanwa Grammar. Huntington Beach, California: Summer Institute of Linguistics. ISBN 0-88312-208-1.
