= Mansakan languages =

Subgroup of the Austronesian language family

Mansakan
- Geographic distribution: Davao Region, Mindanao
- Linguistic classification: Austronesian: Malayo-Polynesian; Philippine; Greater Central Philippine; Central Philippine; Mansakan
- Proto-language: Proto-Mansakan

Language codes
- ISO 639-3: –
- Glottolog: mans1261

The Mansakan languages are a group of Austronesian languages spoken in the Philippines. Dabawenyo is the principal native language of the Davao region; however, there is a high degree of bilingualism in Cebuano among their speakers. Most speakers have shifted to a dialect of Cebuano today.

== Classification ==
=== Overview ===
The Mansakan languages are:

- Mansakan
  - Dabawenyo
  - Mandayan
    - Mansaka
    - Mandaya
  - Kamayo
  - Kalagan (a dialect cluster)
  - Mamanwa

=== Gallman (1974) ===
The Mansakan subgrouping below is from Gallman (1974).

Individual languages are marked by italics, and primary branches by bold italics.

- Mansakan
  - North Mansakan
    - Kamayo North
    - Kamayo South
  - Dabaw
    - Dabawenyo (Davaoeño)
  - Eastern Mansakan
    - Mandayan
  - Western Mansakan
    - Kalagan
    - Tagakaolo
- Mamanwa
