= Kalagan language =

Austronesian dialect cluster

Kalagan
- Native to: Philippines
- Region: Mindanao (Davao Region and a few parts in Caraga)
- Ethnicity: Kalagan people (or "Caragans" or "Caragas")
- Native speakers: (160,000 cited 2000–2002)
- Language family: Austronesian: Malayo-Polynesian; Philippine; Central Philippine; Mansakan; Kalagan

Language codes
- ISO 639-3: Variously: kqe – Kalagan kll – Kagan Kalagan klg – Tagakaulu Kalagan
- Glottolog: west2552

Kalagan is an Austronesian dialect cluster of the Davao Region of Mindanao in the Philippines. It is also spoken in a few parts of Caraga, also in Mindanao.

== Distribution ==
Ethnologue lists the following locations for Kalagan.

- Davao del Sur Province: southwest of Davao City, along inland coasts
- Davao de Oro and Davao del Norte provinces: including Samal and associated islands, and inland on eastern shores of Davao Gulf
- Davao Oriental Province highlands

Kalagan dialects are:

- Isamal dialect: spoken in Samal, Davao del Norte
- Western Kalagan: spoken in Davao Oriental Province
- Lupon: spoken in Davao del Sur Province, along the gulf down to Hagonoy and Guihing near Digos
- Eastern Kalagan: spoken mainly in Davao Oriental Province

Other dialects include the Kagan Kalagan which is spoken near Digos in Davao del Sur Province where there are 6,000 speakers, and the Tagakaulo which is spoken mainly in Davao del Sur Province (western shore of Davao Gulf, from Digos south to Bugis and inland), Sarangani Province (Malungon Municipality), and also in Sultan Kudarat (Columbio municipality) and South Cotabato (Tampakan) provinces.

== Phonology ==
=== Consonants ===
| | | Labial | Dental/ Alveolar | Palatal | Velar | Glottal |
|---|---|---|---|---|---|---|
| Plosive | voiceless | p | t | | k | ʔ |
| Plosive | voiced | b | d | | ɡ | |
| Nasal | | m | n | | ŋ | |
| Fricative | | | s | | | |
| Rhotic | | | (ɾ) | | | |
| Lateral | | | l | | | |
| Approximant | | w | | j | | |

- /d/ can have an allophone of [ɾ] in intervocalic positions.

=== Vowels ===
| | Front | Central | Back |
|---|---|---|---|
| Close | i | ɨ | u |
| Mid | ɛ | | u |
| Open | ɛ | a | |

- /ɨ/ can be heard as [ə] in word-final stressed syllables when preceding /ʔ/.
- /i, a/ can be heard as [ɪ, ʌ] in closed syllables.
- /ɛ/ is heard as [æ] when after /m/.
- /u/ is heard as [o] in word-final position.
