= Mansaka language =

Austronesian language

Mansaka
- Minansaka
- Native to: Philippines
- Region: most parts of Davao de Oro, Mindanao
- Native speakers: (58,000 cited 2000)
- Language family: Austronesian: Malayo-Polynesian; Philippine; Central Philippine; Mansakan; Mandayan; Mansaka

Language codes
- ISO 639-3: msk
- Glottolog: mans1262
- ELP: Mansaka

Mansaka (Mansaka: Minansaka) is an Austronesian language of Mindanao in the Philippines. It may be intelligible with Mandaya.

Mansaka is spoken in western Baganga, and into central-west Davao de Oro province, continuing south back into Davao Oriental Province as far south as Pujada Bay.
