= Tausug language =

Austronesian language of the Tausug people

Tausūg
- Bahasa Sūg, بَهَسَ سُوْغْ
- Native to: Philippines; Malaysia; Indonesia
- Region: — Spoken throughout the Sulu Archipelago (Basilan and Tawi-Tawi), southern Palawan, eastern Sabah and northern portion of North Kalimantan — Also spoken in Zamboanga City and Zamboanga Peninsula
- Ethnicity: Tausūg
- Native speakers: 1.93 million (2013–2020) (Note: The number of speakers in the Philippines is calculated from the reported number of households, based on an average household size of 5.9 persons in the Bangsamoro Autonomous Region in Muslim Mindanao as of 2020.)
- Language family: Austronesian: Malayo-Polynesian; Philippine; Greater Central Philippine; Central Philippine; Bisayan; Southern Bisayan; Butuan–Tausug; Tausūg
- Writing system: Latin (Filipino alphabet); Arabic (Jawi alphabet); Historically Luntar Sūg

Official status
- Official language in: Regional language in the Philippines
- Regulated by: Komisyon sa Wikang Filipino

Language codes
- ISO 639-3: tsg
- Glottolog: taus1251
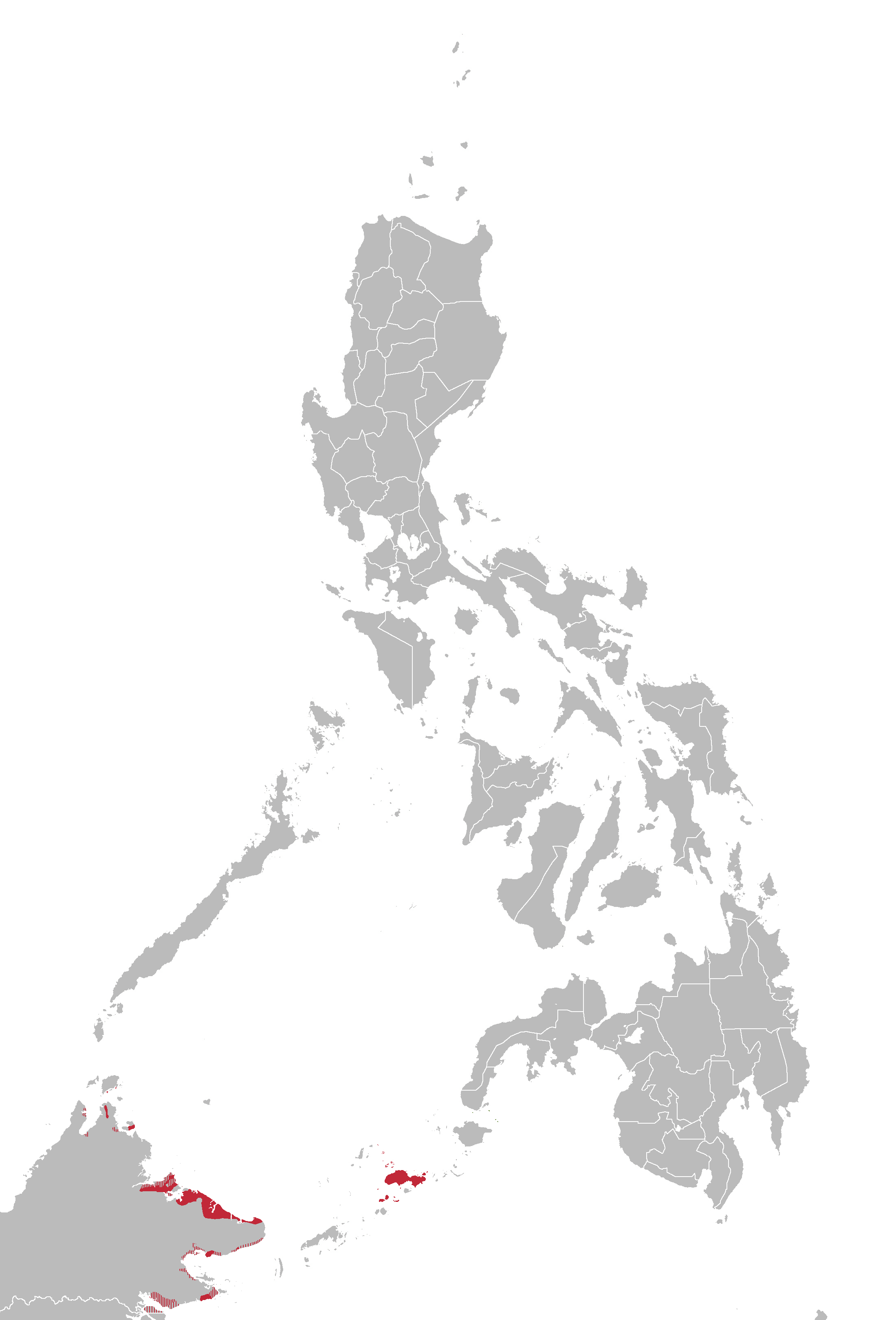
- Areas where Tausūg is the majority language

Tausūg (Bahasa Sūg, بَهَسَ سُوْغْ, Filipino: Wikang Bahasa Súg, Malay: Bahasa Suluk, بهاس سولوق, lit. 'Language of Sulu/the Tausūg people') is an Austronesian language spoken in the province of Sulu in the Philippines and in the eastern area of the state of Sabah, Malaysia. It is widely spoken in the Sulu Archipelago (Sulu, Tawi-Tawi, and Basilan), the Zamboanga Peninsula (Zamboanga del Norte, Zamboanga Sibugay, Zamboanga del Sur, and Zamboanga City), southern Palawan, Malaysia (eastern Sabah), and Indonesia (Tarakan City and Nunukan Regency, province of North Kalimantan).

Tausūg has some lexical similarities or near similarities with Surigaonon language of the provinces Surigao del Norte, Surigao del Sur, and Agusan del Sur and with the Butuanon language of Agusan del Norte; it has also some vocabulary similarities with Sugbuanon, Bicolano, and with other Philippine languages. Many Malay and Arabic words are found in Tausug language.

== Nomenclature ==
In English, the language is primarily known as Tausug (i.e. Tausug language). The local name of the language is bahasa Sūg or Sinūg. The term Tausūg (tau Sūg, meaning "people of Sulu") is derived from two words: tau ("person" or "people") and Sūg

Sūg is the modern form of the older term Sulug (meaning "[sea] currents"), which was also the old name of the island of Jolo. It is derived from Proto-Malayo-Polynesian *sələg ("flowing water, current"), and is a cognate of Cebuano sulog, Tagalog silig, and Malay suluk (a borrowing).

== Classification ==
Tausūg is an Austronesian language. It is classified by linguists as being a member of the Bisayan languages family, which includes Cebuano and Waray. In particular, it has many similarities with the Surigaonon language of the provinces Surigao del Norte, Surigao del Sur and Agusan del Sur and with the Butuanon language of Agusan del Norte – both spoken in northeastern Mindanao; hence, Zorc (1977) groups these three languages as part of a "South Bisayan" grouping.

== Speakers ==
Tausūg is primarily spoken in the Sulu Archipelago, which aside from the island of Sulu, also includes the Tawi-Tawi chain of islands and the island of Basilan. It is a lingua franca spoken in different areas/islands of the archipelago.

Due to migration, the language is also spoken alongside other local languages in the Zamboanga Peninsula (e.g., Cebuano and Chavacano), which includes the provinces of Zamboanga del Norte, Zamboanga Sibugay, Zamboanga del Sur, and Zamboanga City. It is also spoken in Southern Palawan, Eastern Sabah, Malaysia and in Tarakan City and Nunukan Regency, North Kalimantan, Indonesia.

== Phonology ==
=== Vowels ===
Tausūg has three vowel phonemes: /a/, /i/, /u/, with phonemic length (e.g. īpun, "shrimp" vs. ipun, "tooth"). Stress is not phonemic and usually occurs on the final syllable.

The vowel phonemes have a broad range of allophones:

- /a/: [a,ɐ,ɑ]
- /i/: [i,ɪ]
- /u/: [u,ʊ,ɤ,ʌ,ə]

Tausūg has expectedly developed some variations in accent and vocabulary from one area to another, but there are two basic dialects characterized by differences with regard to vowel sounds. The "Gimbahanun" (literally means people from the farm) speakers, the residents of the out-of-town rural areas, use four vowels: /a/, /i/, /u/ and /ə/, the last vowel representing schwa sound or "obscure u", a retention from Proto-Philippine and Proto-Bisayan. The "Parianun", the residents of the urban areas, use only three vowel phonemes: /a/, /i/, /u/,; the loss of /ə/ is common in many Bisayan and other Philippine languages.

=== Consonants ===
The consonant phonemes are:

		Labial	Alveolar	Palatal	Velar	Glottal
Nasal		m	n		ŋ	
Plosive Affricate	voiceless	p	t		k	ʔ
Plosive Affricate	voiced	b	d	d͡ʒ ⟨j⟩	ɡ	
Fricative		f	s			h
Approximant			l	j ⟨y⟩	w	
Trill			r			

Allophones:

- /b/: per default [b], but [β] between vowels
- /g/: per default [ɡ], but [ɣ] between vowels
- /h/: per default [h], but [ɦ] between vowels
- /r/: per default [r], but [ɹ] before /m, n, g, k/

Medial gemination (of all non-glottal consonants) is phonemic.

== Grammar ==
=== Pronouns ===
==== Personal pronouns ====
Tausūg has three pronoun sets:

			nominative		genitive		oblique	
1st person	singular		aku	اَكُ	-ku	ـكُ	kāku'	كَاكُؤْ
1st person	dual		kita	كِتَ	-ta / -natu'	ـتَ / ـنَتُؤْ	kātu'	كَاتُؤْ
1st person	plural	exclusive	kami	كَمِ	-namu	ـنَمُؤْ	kāmu'	كَامُؤْ
1st person	plural	inclusive	kitanyu	كِتَپُ	-taniyu / -natu'nyu	ـتَپُ / ـنَتُؤْپُ	katu'nyu, katu'tanyu	کَاتُؤْپُ / كَاتُؤْتَپُ
2nd person	singular		ikaw / kaw	اِكَوْ / كَوْ	-mu	ـمُ	kaymu	كَيْمُ
2nd person	plural		kamu	كَمُ	-nyu	ـپُ	kanyu	كَپُ
3rd person	singular		siya	سِيَ	-niya	ـنِيَ	kaniya	كَنِيَ
3rd person	plural		sila	سِلَ	-nila	ـنِلَ	kanila	كَنِلَ

=== Case markers ===
The case markers of Tausūg are:

	nominative	genitive	oblique
common	in	sin	ha
common	اِنْ	سِنْ	هَ
proper singular	hi		kan
proper singular	هِ		كَنْ
proper plural	hinda'		kanda'
proper plural	هِنْدَ		كَنْدَ

Non-subject undergoers take the oblique marker when definite or a proper noun, but indefinite common nouns take the genitive marker sin.

- Hi Nasul in kimaun ha mampallam. هِ نَسُلْ اِنْ کِمَؤُنْ هَ مَمْفَلَّمْ.
  - "It was Nasul who ate the mango."
- Nagdakdak sin baju' in manga bujang. نَغْدَكْ۲ سِنْ بَجُ اِنْ مَڠَ بُجَڠْ.
  - "The maidens washed clothes."

=== Existentials ===
The positive existential ("there is") is aun, the negative existential ("there is none") is way.

=== Interrogative words ===
English	Tausug
Who?	Siyu?/Hisiyu?
What?	Unu?
Where?	Diin? / Hariin? / Hāin? (contracted Hariin) / Haunu? (Ha+uuu)
Why?	Mayta'? / Mahi?
When? (future)	Ku'nu?
When? (past)	Ka'nu?
How? (manner)	Biya'diin?
How many?	Pila?

=== Verbs ===
Verbs in Tausūg are inflected for focus and aspect.

	completed	progressive	contemplative	imperative
Actor focus	⟨im⟩ nag- naN-	C⟨im⟩V- nag-CV- naN-CV-	‹um› mag- maN-	∅ ∅ paN-
Patient focus	⟨i⟩	C⟨iy⟩V-	-un	-a
Locative focus	⟨i⟩ -an	C⟨iy⟩V- -an	-an	-i
Instrument focus	⟨i⟩	C⟨iy⟩V-	hi-	-an

Affixes expressing ability:

	completed	progressive	contemplative
Actor focus	naka-	nakaka-	maka-
Patient focus	na-	na-CV-	ma-
Locative focus	kiya- -an	kiya-CV- -an	ka- -an
Instrument focus	kiya-	kiya-CV-	hika-

=== Numbers ===
Tausūg numerals:

	Tausug	
1	isa / hambuuk	اِسَ
2	duwa	دُوَ
3	tū	تُوْ
4	upat	اُفَتْ
5	lima	لِيْمَ
6	unum	اُنُمْ
7	pitu	فِتُ
8	walu	وَلُ
9	siyam	سِيَمْ
10	hangpū'	هَڠْفُؤْ
11	hangpū' tag isa	هَڠْفُؤْ تَغِسَ
20	kawha'an	كَوْهَأَنْ
30	katlu'an	كَتْلُؤَنْ
40	kapatan	كَفَتَنْ
50	kay'man	كَيْئْمَنْ
60	kanuman	كَأْنُمَنْ
70	kapituwan	كَفِتُوَنْ
80	kawaluwan	كَوَلُوَنْ
90	kasiyaman	كَسِيَمَنْ
100	hanggatus / gatus	هَڠْغَتُسْ / غَتُسْ
1,000	hangibu / ibu	هَڠِيْبُ / إِيْبُ
1,282	hangibu tag duwang gatus tag kawaluwan tag duwa	هَڠِيْبُ تَغْدُوَڠْ غَتُسْ تَغْكَوَلُوَنْ تَغْدُوَ
2,000	duwa nga'ibu	دُوَ ڠَئِيْبُ
10,000	hangpu' nga'ibu	هَڠْپُؤْ ڠَئِيْبُ

== Writing system ==
Tausūg is today primarily written using the Latin alphabet. Historically, it had previously been written using the Arabic alphabet. The script used was derived from Jawi used in writing the Malay language. The script is referred to as Sulat Sug

The Arabic script used to write Tausūg differs in some aspects from the script used for Arabic and in the Jawi script used for Malay.

In Sulu, there is no separate letter for [g]. Whereas in Jawi, the sound [g] is represented by the letter غ (which has a pronunciation [ɣ] in Arabic) is reserved for Arabic loanwords, and sometimes the letter ݢ.

In Sulu, there is no differentiation between [f] and [p]. Whereas in Jawi, the letters ف and ڤ are used respectively, in Sulu the letter ف is used in all instances.

For the sound [ɲ] in the final position, in Sulu, the letter پ is used whereas in Malay Jawi, the letter ڽ is instead used. The letter پ is associated with the sound [p] in Persian and other scripts derived from Persian. In both Malay Jawi and Sulu the letter پـ/ڽـ is used in all other positions.

For the sound [k] in the final position, in Malay Jawi, the letter ک is used, having the same form as when in initial or medial positions. In Sulu, similar to Arabic, it is customary to use ك.

=== Latin ===
Tausūg Alphabet (Bahasa Sūg Alipbā'tā')
Letter	A	B	D	G	H	I	J	K	L	M
Name	Alip	bā'	dāl	gā'	hā'	ī	jīm	kāp	lām	mīm
IPA	/a/	/b/, /β/	/d/	/ɡ/, /ɣ/	/h/, /ɦ/	/i/	/dʒ/	/k/	/l/	/m/
Letter	N	Ng	P	R	S	T	U	W	Y	'
Name	nūn	ngā'	pā'	rā'	sīn	tā'	ū	wāw	yā'	hamja
IPA	/n/	/ŋ/	/p/	/r/, /ɹ/	/s/	/t/	/u/	/w/	/j/	/ʔ/

=== Arabic ===
Tausūg Alphabet – Arabic Script
Character	Isolated	Initial	Medial	Final	Name
ا	ﺍ			ﺎ	alip
ب	ب	بـ	ـبـ	ـب	bā'
ت	ﺕ	ﺗ	ـﺘ	ـﺖ	tā'
ث	ث	ثـ	ـثـ	ـث	sā(thā')
پ	پ	پـ	ـپـ	ـپ	nyā'
ج	ﺝ	ﺟ	ـﺠ	ـﺞ	jīm
ح	ح	حـ	ـحـ	ـح	hā'
خ	خ	خـ	ـخـ	ـخ	khā'
چ	چ	چـ	ـچـ	ـچ	chā'
د	د			ـد	dāl
ذ	ذ			ـذ	jāl
ر	ﺭ			ـر	rā'
ز	ز			ـز	jā'
س	ﺱ	ﺳ	ـﺴ	ـﺲ	sīn
ش	ش	شـ	ـشـ	ـش	sīn
ص	ص	صـ	ـصـ	ـص	sād
ض	ض	ضـ	ـضـ	ـض	dād
ط	ط	طـ	ـطـ	ـط	tā'
ظ	ظ	ظـ	ـظـ	ـظ	lā'
ع	ع	عـ	ـعـ	ـع	'ayn
غ	ﻍ	ﻏ	ـﻐـ	ـﻎ	gayn
ڠ	ڠ	ڠـ	ـڠـ	ـڠ	ngā'
ف	ﻑ	ﻓ	ـﻔ	ـﻒ	pā'
ق	ق	قـ	ـقـ	ـق	kāp
ك	ك	كـ	ـكـ	ـك	kāp
ل	ﻝ	ﻟ	ـﻠ	ـﻞ	lām
م	ﻡ	ﻣ	ـﻤ	ـﻢ	mīm
ن	ﻥ	ﻧ	ـﻨ	ﻦ	nūn
ه	ﻩ	ﻫ	ـﻬ	ﻪ	hā'
و	ﻭ			ـو	wāw
ي	ﻱ	ﻳ	ـﻴـ	ﻲ	yā'
ء	ء			ء	hamja
أ	أ			ـأ	alip with hamja above
ﺅ	ﺅ			ـﺆ	wāw with hamja above
ئ	ئ	ئـ	ــئـ	ـئ	yā' with hamja above
لا	لا	لا	ــلا	ــلا	lām alip

=== Sample Texts ===
Below some examples of Sulu in both Latin and Arabic scripts:

- Latin script:
  - Wayruun tuhan malayngkan Allāh, hi Muhammad ing (in) rasūl sin Allāh
- Arabic script
  - وَيْرُؤُنْ تُهَنْ مَلَيِڠْکَنْ هَالله، هِمُحَمَّدْ اِڠْ رَسُولْ سِنْ الله
- English translation
  - There is no god but Allah, Muhammad is the Messenger of Allah

- Latin script
  - Uu kamu manga bang-sa Islam dii haka-pu'-pu' an Suug, agad tu'ud kamy sing da'akun i-ban sing tagga-hun sing parin-ta.
- Arabic script
  - اُو كَمْ مَڠَ بَڠْ‌سَ اِسْلَامْ دِي هَكَ فُؤْ۲ اَنْ سُوغْ اَغَدْ تُؤُدْ كَمُ سِڠْ دَأَ كُنْ اِ بَنْ سِڠْ تَغَّ هُنْ سِڠْ فَرِنْ تَ.
- English translation
  - Oh ye of Islamic race here in the Sulu Archipelago, obey ye fully the orders and prohibitions of the government.

== Examples ==
English	Tausūg Latin Script	Tausūg Arabic Script
What is your name?	Unu in ngān mu? (Note: "Unu in ngān mu?" is a literal translation of Tagalog question "Ano ang pangalan mo?" (or "What is your name?" in English) but is not used by autochthonous Tausūg in day-to-day conversations. To use "Unu in ngān mu" is a glaring sign that the speaker is not a Tausug. "Siyu (or Hisiyu) in ngān mu?" is used for knowing the given or personal name, but to know other callings that are not personal, "Unu" is used, as in: "Unu in pagtawag kaymu ha bāy?" (What is your calling in the house?... "In pagtawag kāku' Bungsu, sabab aku in kabungsuhan." (My calling is Bungsu because I am the youngest); "Unu in ama' mu? Siyu in ngān niya?" (What is your father? What is his name?)..."In ama' ku mangingista'. In ngān niya hi Abdulla." (My father is a fisherman. His name is Abdulla);) / Siyu in ngān mu?	اُنُ اِنْ ڠَانْ مُ؟ / سِيُ اِنْ ڠَانْ مُ؟
My name is Muhammad.	In ngān ku Muhammad.	اِنْ ڠَانْ كُ مُحَّمَدْ.
How are you?	Maunu-unu na kaw?	مَؤُنُ اُنُ نَكَوْ؟
I am good.	Marayaw da isab.	مَرَيَوْ دَ اِسَبْ.
Where is Ahmad?	Hariin hi Ahmad?	هَرَينْ هِ اَحْمَدْ؟
He is in the house.	Yadtu siya ha bāy.	يَدْتُ سِيَ هَ بَايْ.
Thank you!	Magsukul kaymu!	مَغْسُكُلْ كَيْمُ

== Loanwords ==
Many Tausug words derive from the Arabic language.

Some examples of Arabic words in Tausug are

Tausūg Word	Meaning (Tausūg)	Arabic Word	Pronunciation	Meaning (Arabic)
Adab	manners	أدب	adab	manners
Ahirat	hereafter	آخرة	ākhirah	hereafter
Ajayb	amazing	عجيب	'ajīb	amazing
Akkal	intelligence	عقل	'Aql	intellect
Alam	universe	عالم	'ālam	world
Allāh	God (Allah)	الله	Allāh	God (Allah)
Amānat	message	أمانة	amānah	trust
Ammal	use	عمل	'amal	to make
Awal	origin	أوّل	awwal	first
Awliya	ascetic	أولياء	awliyā'	ascetics
Ayat	verse	آية	āyah	verse
Ayb	shame	عيب	'ayb	shame
Barawi	Desert robber	بدوي	badawī	bedouin
Batāl	unclean	باطل	bātil	void
Bilāl	Muezzin/caller to prayer	بلال	Bilāl	Bilal ibn Rabah
Daawa	excuse/alibi	دعوة	da'wah	invitation
Duhul	extremity	دخول	dukhūl	entrance
Daira	city	دائرة	dā'irah	area
Dayyus	cuckold	ديّوث	dayyūth	cuckold
Dunya	earth	دنيا	dunyā	world
Duwaa	prayer	دعاء	du'ā	prayer/supplication
Habal	news	خبر	khabar	news
Hadas	impurity	حدث	hadath	impurity
Hakīka	birth ritual	عقيقة	aqīqah	birth ritual
Hakīkat	truth	حقيقة	haqīqah	truth
Hatīb	speaker	خطيب	khatīb	speaker
Hawa	Eve	حواء	Hawā'	Eve
Hidāyat	announcement	هداية	hidāyah	guidance
Hikmat	wisdom	حكمة	hikmah	wisdom
Hukum	judge	حكم	hukm	ruling
Humus	alms	خمس	khums	fifth
Hutba'	sermon	خطبة	khutbah	sermon
Hurup	sound of a letter	حروف	hurūf	letters
Ibilīs	demon	إبليس	Iblīs	devil
Ihilās	sincerity	إخلاص	ikhlās	sincerity
Ijin	blessing	إذن	idhn	permission
Ilmu'	knowledge	علم	'ilm	knowledge
Imān	forbearingness	إيمان	īmān	faith
Intiha'	end	إنتهى	intihā	end
Irādat	determination	إرادة	irādah	determination
Islām	Islam	إسلام	Islām	Islam
Istigapar	to beg pardon	إستغفار	istighfār	to beg pardon
Instinja	pure	إستنجاء	istinjā'	to clean one's self
Jabūr	Psalms	زبور	zabūr	Psalms
Jāhil	foolish	جاهل	jāhil	ignorant
Jakāt	tithe	زكاة	zakāh	tithe
Jamāa	congregation	جماعة	jamā'ah	congregation
Jamān	clock	زمان	zamān	time
Janāja	bier	جنازة	janāzah	funeral
Jāt	appearance	ذات	dhāt	self
Jaytūn	olive	زيتون	zaytūn	olive
Jin	spirit	جنّ	jinn	demon
Jinā	adultery	زنا	zinā	adultery
Juba	garment	جبّة	jubbah	garment
Jubul	anus	دبر	dubr	anus
Junub	pollution	جنوب	junūb	dirty
Jurriyat	lineage	ذرية	dhurriyyah	offspring
Kahawa	coffee	قهوة	qahwah	coffee
Kāpil	disbeliever	كافر	kāfir	disbeliever
Karāmat	miracle	كرامة	karāmah	miracle
Kawwāt	power	قوّة	quwwah	force
Kubul	grave	قبور	qubūr	graves
Kudarat	Power of God	قدرة	qudrah	ability
Kulbān	sacrifice	قربان	qurbān	sacrifice
Kuppiya'	male head covering	كوفيّة	kūffiyah	kefiyyeh
Kupul	disbelief	كفز	kufr	disbelief
Lidjiki'	blessing	رزق	rizq	sustenance
Maana	meaning	معنة	ma'nah	meaning
Magrib	sunset	مغرب	maghrib	sunset
Magsukul	Thanks	شكر	shukr	thanks
Mahluk	human	مخلوق	maklūq	created
Maksud	purpose	مقصود	maqsūd	intended
Makbul	fulfilled	مقبول	maqbūl	accepted
Malak	Beautiful	ملك	malak	Angel
Maruhum	deceased	مرحوم	marhūm	deceased
Masrik	east	مشرق	mashriq	east
Matakaddam	parable	متقدّم	mutaqaddam	preceding
Mayat	corpse	ميت	mayt	dead
Mujijat	mystery	معجزة	mu'jizah	miracle
Mulid	pupil	مريد	murīd	pupil
Munapik	hypocrite	منافق	munāfiq	hypocrite
Murtad	apostate	مرتد	murtad	apostate
Muskil	uncommon	مشكل	mushkil	problem
Mustahak	lawful owner	مستحقّ	mustahaqq	deserving
Mustajab	occurred	مستجاب	mustajāb	answered
Muwallam	scholar	معلّم	mu'allim	teacher
Nabī	prophet	نبي	nabī	prophet
Najal	promise	نذر	nadhar	vow/promise
Najjis	filth	ناجس	nājis	filthy
Napas	breath	نفس	nafas	breathe
Napsu	desire	نفس	nafs	ego/desire
Nasihat	advice	نصيحة	nasīhah	advice
Paham	familiarity	فهم	fahm	understanding
Pardu'	legislation	فرض	fard	compulsory
Piil	action	فعل	fi'l	action
Pikil	think	فكر	fikr	thought
Pir'awn	Pharaoh	فرعون	fir'awn	Pharaoh
Rahmat	blessing	رحمة	rahmah	mercy
Rasūl	messenger	رسول	rasūl	messenger
Ruku'	bow	ركوع	rukū'	bowing
Rukun	precept	ركن	rukn	pillar
Sabab	because	سبب	sabab	reason/cause
Sahabat	follower	صحابة	sahābah	companions
Saytān	Satan	شيطان	shaytān	Satan
Sual	discussion	سؤال	su'āl	question
Subu	dawn	صبح	subh	dawn
Sunnat	female circumcision	سنّة	sunnah	tradition/sunnah
Takabbul	arrogant	تكبّر	takabbur	arrogance
Takwīm	calendar	تقويم	taqwīm	calendar
Tallak	divorce	طلاق	talāq	divorce
Tarasul	Tausug poem	تراسل	tarāsul	correspondence
Tasbi	prayer beads	تسبيح	tasbīh	praise
Ummul	age	عمر	'amr	age
Wajib	compulsory	واجب	wājib	compulsory
Wakap	pause	وقف	waqf	pause
Waktu	time	وقت	waqt	time

Tausūg words derived from Sanskrit

Tausūg Word		Meaning (Tausūg)	Sanskrit Word	Pronunciation	Meaning (Sanskrit)
Guru	غُرُ	teacher	गुरु	guru	teacher
Naga	نَغَ	dragon	नाग	nāga	serpent
Āgama	آغَمَ	religion	आगम	āgama	religion
Lahu'	لَهُؤْ	eclipse	राहु	rāhu	eclipse
Lupa	لُفَ	appearance	रूप	rūpa	appearance
Dukka	دُكَّ	grieve	दुःख	duḥkha	suffering
Sutla'	سُتْلَأْ	silk	सूत्र	sūtra	to sew/thread

== See also ==
- Languages of the Philippines
- Yakan
- Bikol
- Cebuano
- Chavacano
- Hiligaynon
- Kapampangan
- Ilocano
- Pangasinan
- Bisayan languages
- Waray language

== Bibliography ==
- Peneyra, Irma V. (1992). A Grammatical Sketch of the Tausug Language. The Archive, Publication 6. Diliman: University of the Philippines.
- Rubino, Carl R. Galvez (2005). Intensive Tausug: A Pedagogical Grammar of the Language of Jolo, Philippines. Dunwoody Press. ISBN 978-1-931546-17-1.
- Tan, Evangeline K. (1967). The Phonology of Tausug: A Descriptive Analysis (Master's thesis). University of British Columbia. doi:10.14288/1.0105420.
