= Davao Region =

Administrative region of the Philippines

- Region
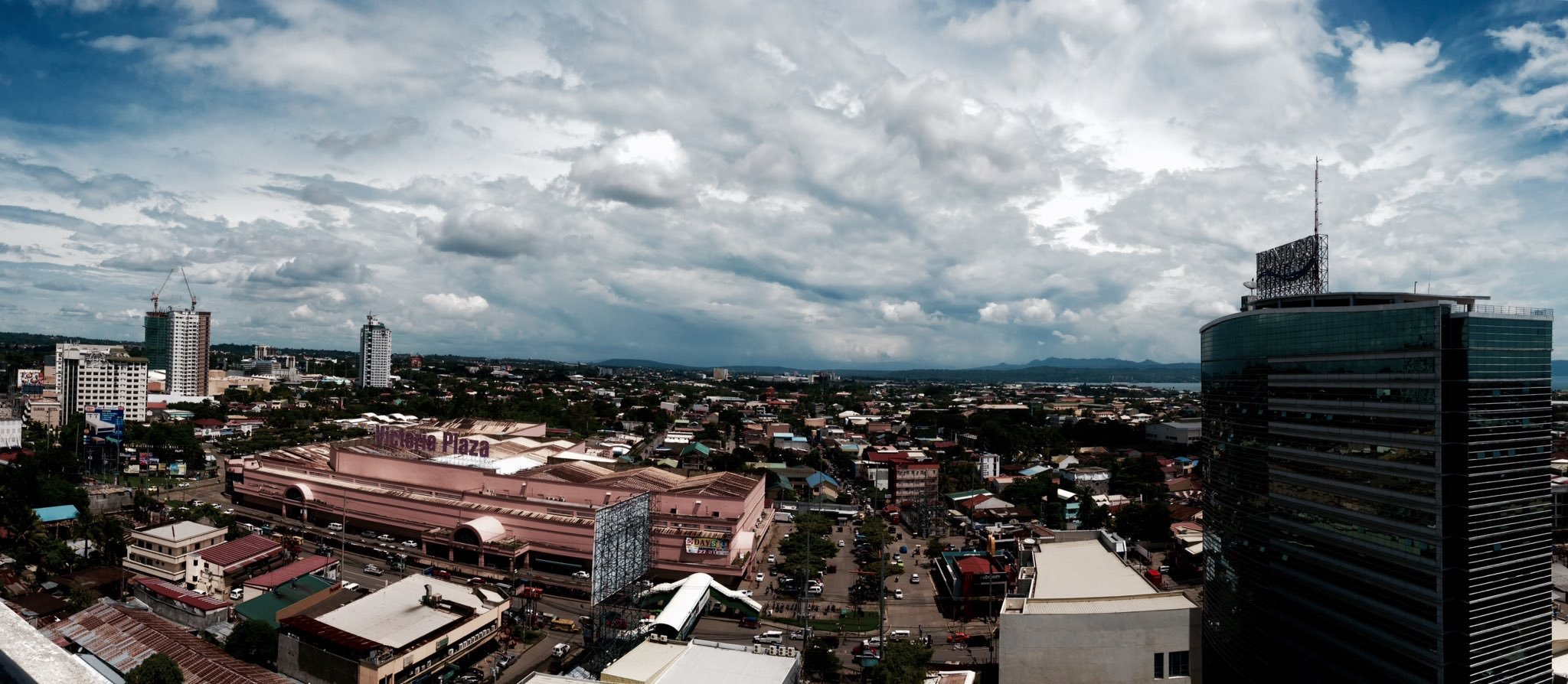
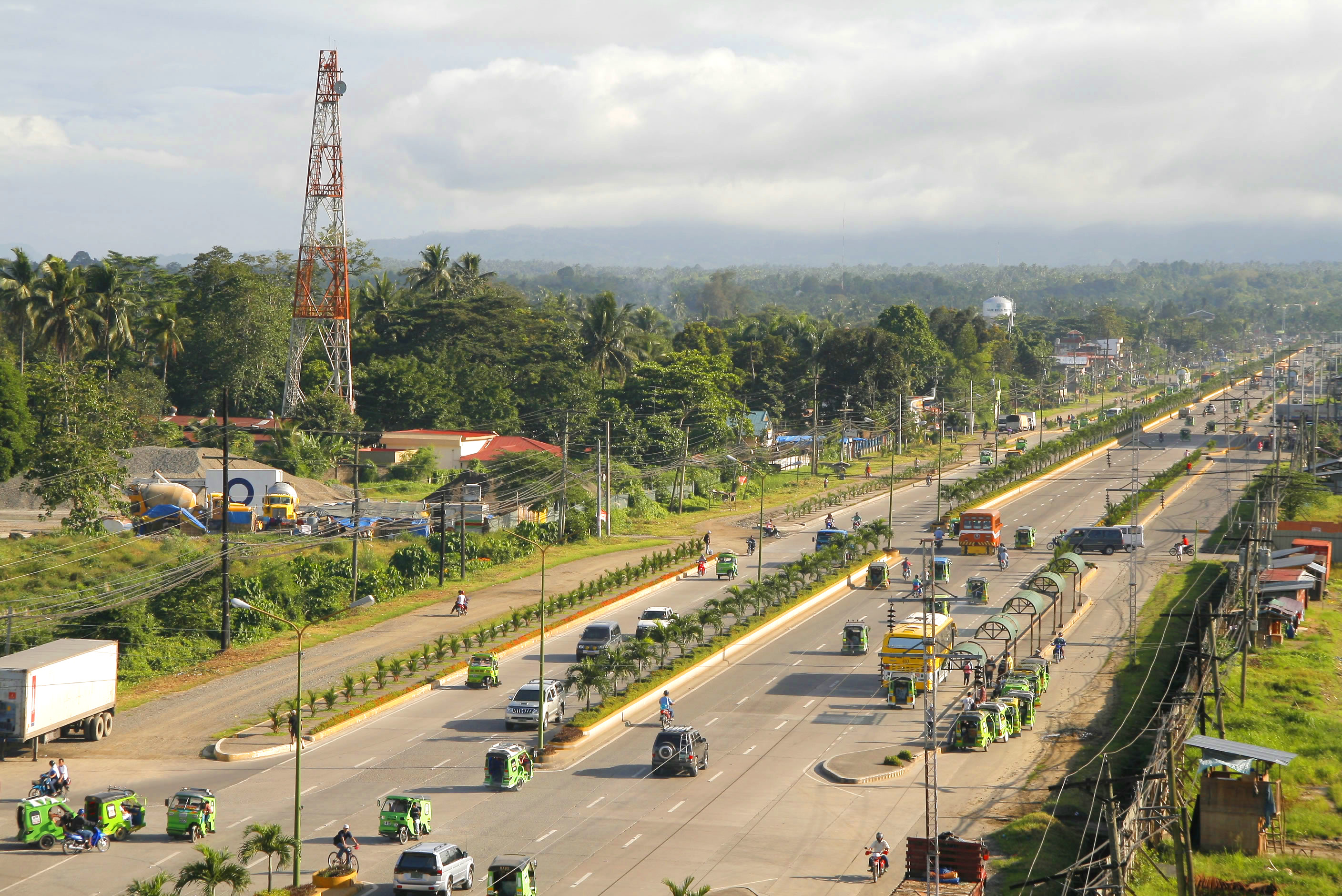
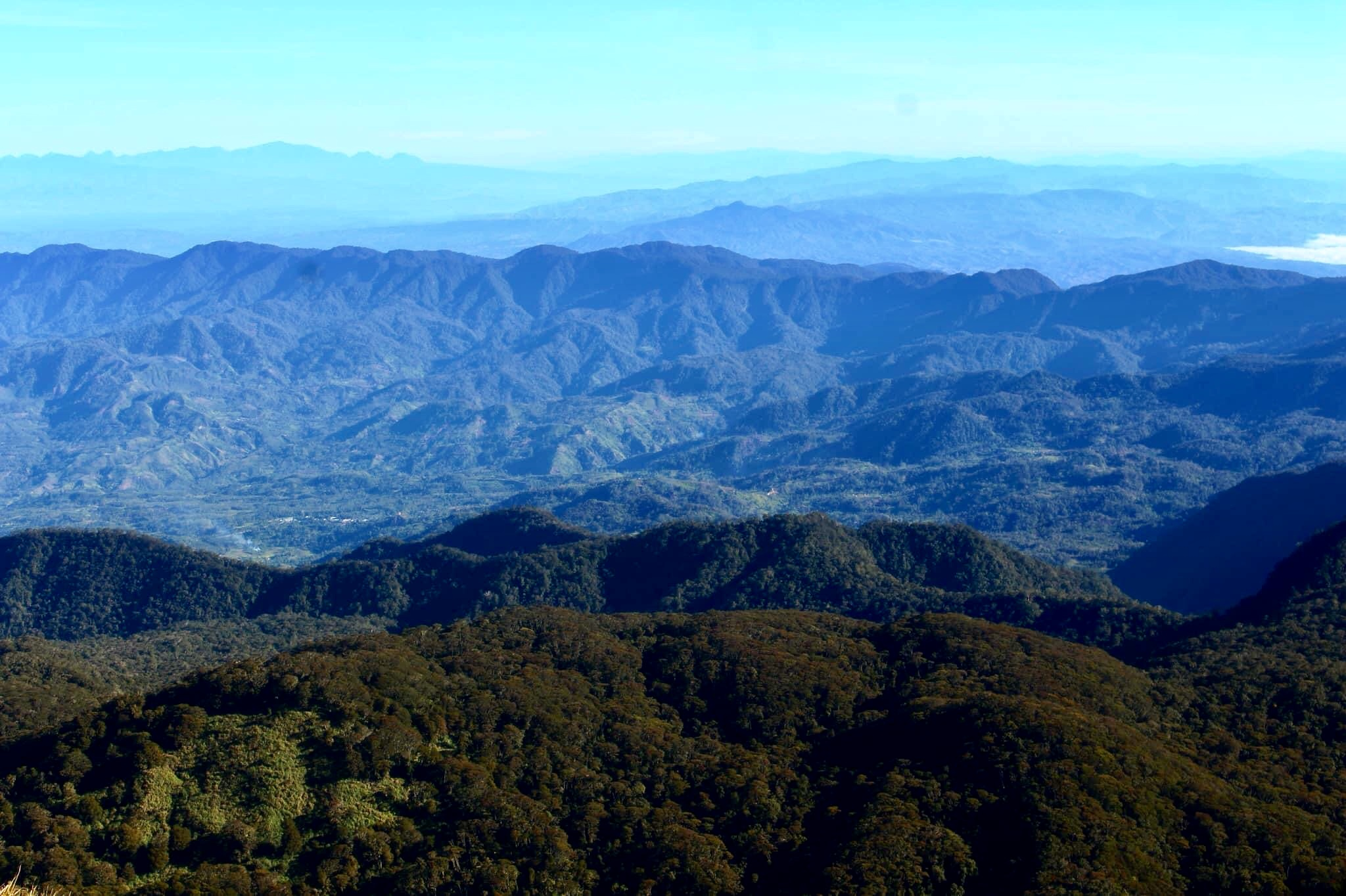
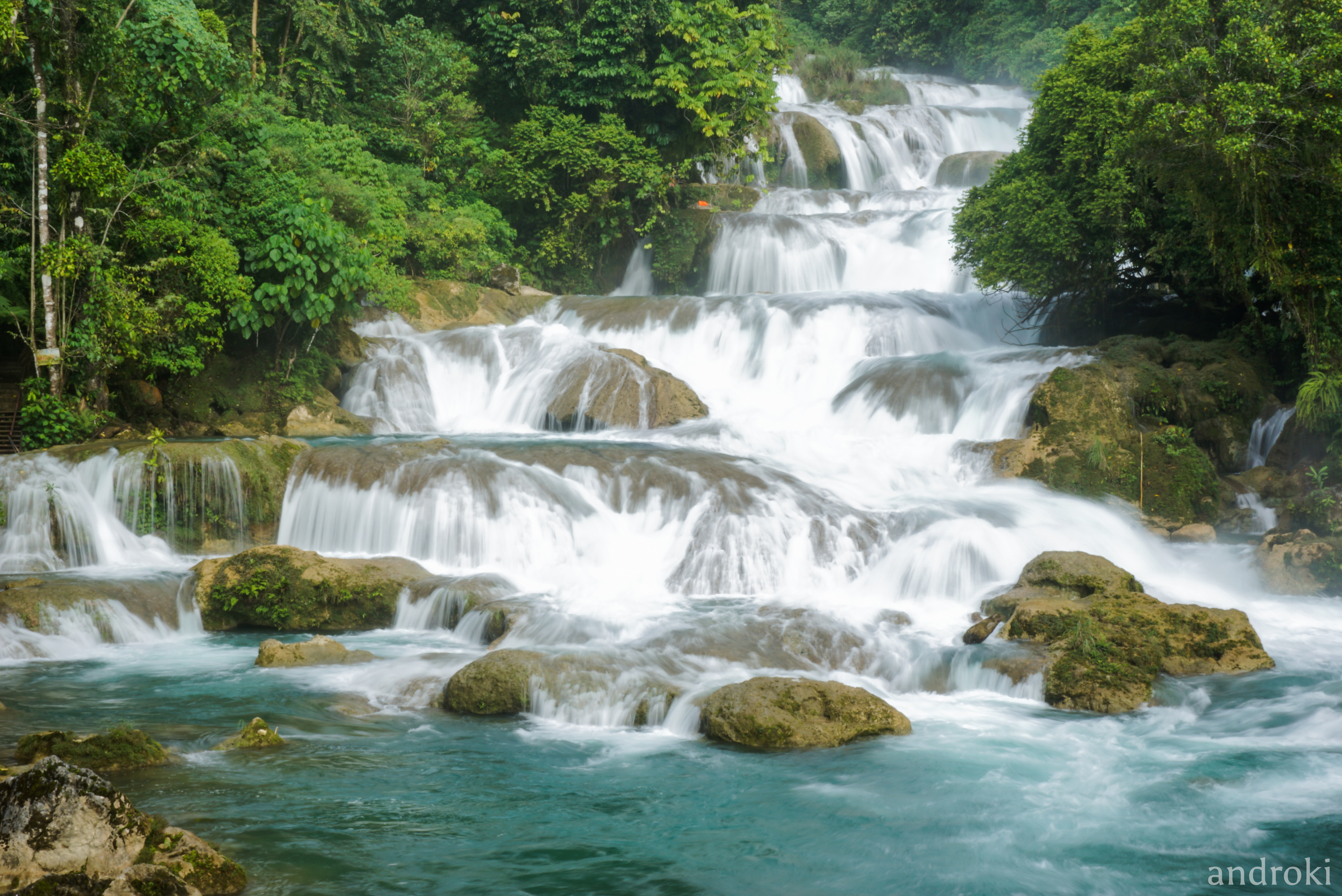
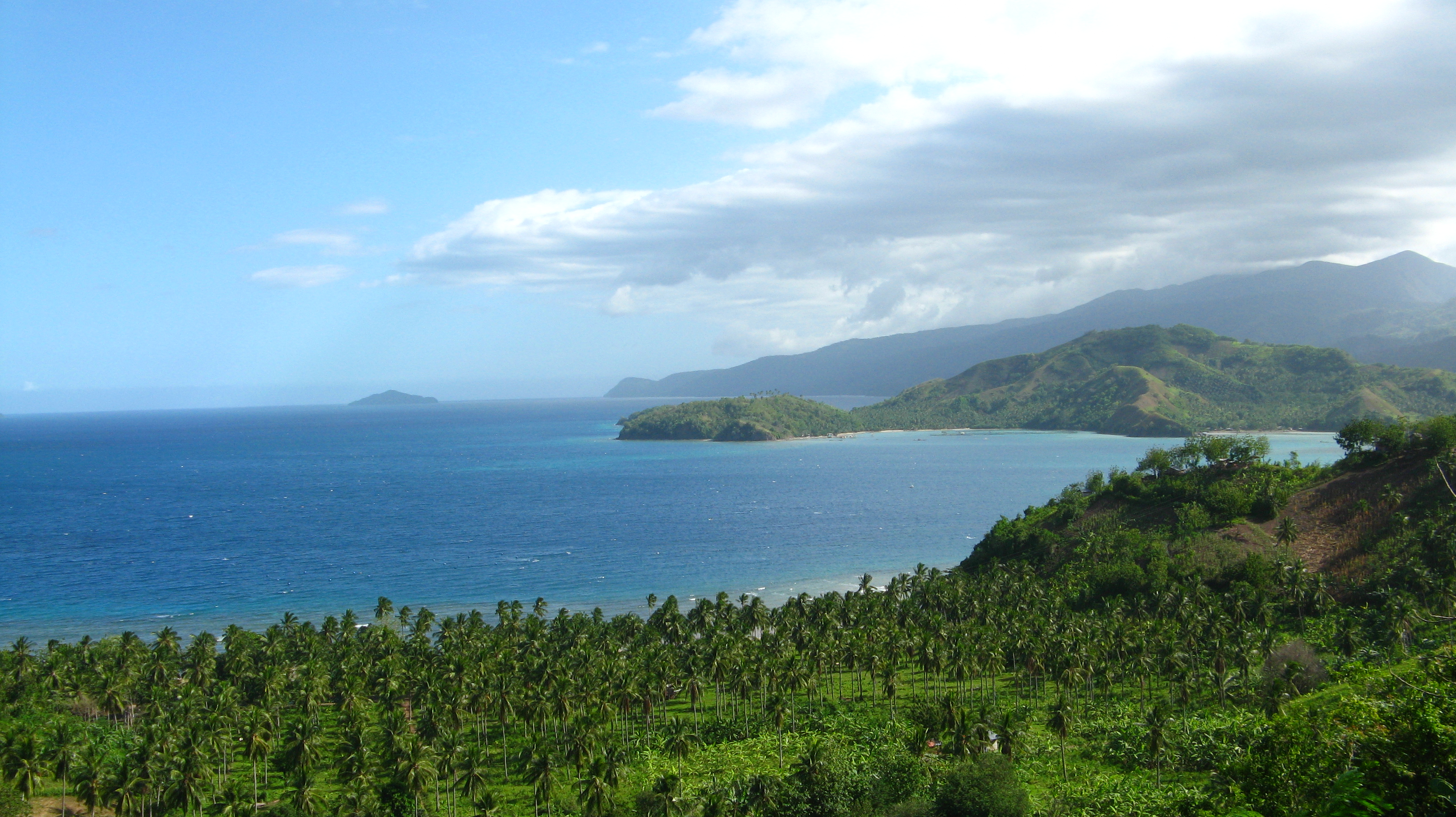
- Clockwise from the top: Davao City aerial view, Mount Apo, Pujada Bay, Aliwagwag Protected Landscape, Tagum
- Nickname: Cacao Capital of the Philippines
- Anthem: Pinanggang Yuta (Beloved Land)
- Location in the Philippines
- Interactive map of Davao Region
- Coordinates: 7°05′N 125°35′E
- Country: Philippines
- Island group: Mindanao
- Regional center and largest city: Davao City

Area
  - Total: 20,357.42 km^{2} (7,860.04 sq mi)
- Highest elevation (Mount Apo): 2,954 m (9,692 ft)

Population (2024 census)
  - Total: 5,389,422
  - Density: 264.7399/km^{2} (685.6733/sq mi)
  - Households: 1,337,781
- Demonyms: Davaoan (English); Davaoeño (Spanish); Dabawenyo, Dabawnon (Cebuano, Tagalog)

Divisions
  - Provinces: 5: Davao de Oro; Davao del Norte; Davao del Sur; Davao Occidental; Davao Oriental
  - Independent cities: 1: Davao City
  - Component cities: 5: Digos; Mati; Panabo; Samal; Tagum
  - Municipalities: 43
  - Barangays: 1,162
  - Districts: 11

Economy
  - Poverty incidence: 5.5% (2025)
  - GDP total: US$24.1 billion
  - GDP per capita: US$4,419
  - HDI (2023): 0.718 high · 10th of 17
- Time zone: UTC+8 (PST)
- PSGC: 110000000
- ISO 3166 code: PH-11
- Electorate: 3,376,470 voters (2025)
- Languages: Cebuano; Mandaya; Kalagan; Giangan; Dibabawon; Tagabawa; Mansaka; Sangirese; Obo; Sarangani; Tagalog; Filipino; English; Spanish

The Davao Region (Cebuano: Rehiyon sa Dabaw; Filipino: Rehiyon ng Davao), designated as Region XI, is an administrative region in the Philippines. Formerly called Southern Mindanao, it is situated in the southeastern portion of Mindanao, enclosing the Davao Gulf. The region comprises five provinces: Davao de Oro, Davao del Norte, Davao del Sur, Davao Oriental, and Davao Occidental. Davao City is the region's sole highly urbanized city, as well as its regional center.

== Etymology ==
The region's name is derived from its Bagobo origins, who are indigenous to the area. The word davao came from the phonetic blending of three Bagobo subgroups' names for the Davao River, a major waterway emptying into Davao Gulf near the city. The Obos, who inhabit the hinterlands of the region, called the river Davah (with a gentle vowel ending, although later pronunciation is with a hard v or b); the Klata (or Giangan/Diangan) called it Dawaw, and the Tagabawas called it Dabo. To the Obos, davah also means "a place beyond the high grounds" (alluding to settlements at the mouth of the river surrounded by high, rolling hills).

== History ==
The history of the region dates back to the times when various tribes occupied the region. It is believed that the Manobos, Mandayas, Kalagans, Mansakas, and Bagobos occupied the area. These are the same tribes that created the small settlements and communities that eventually became Mindanao.

=== Maguindanao era ===
The Davao Region was once part of Sultanate of Maguindanao and was called "Pinagurasan" by the Maguindanaons. Early settlers of the region were Maguindanaons and the Tausugs under the Sultanate of Sulu. Datu Bago was one of the Datus in Davao Gulf who resisted the Spanish Empire colonization on the region.

=== First European contact ===
The Davao Gulf area was the first region in the country that was in contact with the Europeans, with such contacts taking place as early as 16th century. The Portuguese preceded the Spaniards, who were the ones to colonize the region albeit much later, in sighting and visiting the region. In 1512, Francisco Serrano was shipwrecked in the shallow waters and coral reefs of Cape of San Agustín, located in what is now the province of Davao Oriental. In 1538, Francisco de Castro, a Portuguese ship captain, was driven by strong winds to the southeastern coast of Mindanao. He baptized several chieftains in the area.

Around January 1546, Francis Xavier, a Jesuit priest, left Malacca and went to Molucca Islands, then called the Spice Islands, where the Portuguese had some settlements, and for a year and a half he preached the Gospel to the inhabitants of Amboyna, Ternate, Baranura, and other lesser islands. It is claimed by some that during this expedition he landed on the island of Mindanao, which is confirmed by some writers of the seventeenth century, and in the Bull of canonization issued in 1623. It is also said that he is the one to have preached the Gospel in Mindanao.

=== Spanish administration ===
For centuries the tribes lived in relative peace until the Spanish, under the adventurous Spanish businessman Don Jose Oyanguren, arrived in the region in 1847. At that time, the Kalagan Moro chieftain Datu Bago was in control of the area in what is now Davao City. Don Oyanguren attempted to conquer the area which Datu Bago ruled; although he failed at first, the Moro chieftain eventually evacuated his people to live in the areas near Mount Apo. This is the time the town of Davao, then called Nueva Vergara by the Spaniards, was established in the year 1848.

Don Oyanguren attempted to develop the region. Although the Spanish gained the upper hand when they finally controlled the ports of the region, the population of Davao grew very slowly until the arrival of Christian missionaries in the area in 1890. Unlike the major parts of Luzon, Visayas and other coastal parts of Mindanao, Spanish rule in Davao lasted only for 50 years, abandoning it in 1898 when the Philippines became independent from Spain, making it among the shortest-lived areas controlled by Spain as Davao was among the last areas in the Philippines conquered by the Spaniards.

=== American administration ===
After the Spanish–American War in 1898, Spanish rule in the region ended. Americans then landed in the region and they subsequently developed the regions communications and transportation systems. During this period, private farm ownership grew in the region. Japanese migration in the region began as two Japanese entrepreneurs, Kyosaburo Ohta and Yoshizo Furukawa, were finding better agricultural lands for building abaca and coconut plantations in the region. The Port of Davao was opened on 1900, becoming the first Philippine international port to be established in the south.

In 1903 until 1914, the region was one of the districts of the former Moro Province in Mindanao. After 1914, the province was replaced by an American colonial agency called Department of Mindanao and Sulu, which spanned the entire Mindanao island except Lanao. The agency lasted from 1914 to 1920.

==== Wartime Japanese occupation ====
In 1942, during World War II, as the Japanese occupation of the Philippines began, the region was one of the first among the Philippine regions to be subjected by Japanese occupation. The Japanese immigrants in Davao acted as a fifth column, welcoming the Japanese invaders during World War II. These Japanese were hated by the Moro Muslims and disliked by the Chinese. The Moros were judged as "fully capable of dealing with Japanese fifth columnists and invaders alike." The Moros were to fight the Japanese invaders when they landed at Davao on Mindanao. The Japanese went back to their ships at night to sleep since the Moros struck so much fear into them, even though the Moros were outnumbered by the Japanese. The longest battle of the Allied liberation campaign, the Battle of Davao, took place in 1945. After the war, the region eventually passed to the American hands again for at least almost one year before the formal Philippine independence on July 4, 1946, most of the Japanese living in the region were now integrated in the Filipino population.

=== Philippine administration ===
==== Davao province ====
Prior to Philippine independence in 1946, the entire region was a single province called Davao Province, with Davao City serving as its capital. The province was one of the largest provinces in the Philippines during that time, spanning more than 20,000 square kilometres (7,700 sq mi). It lasted from 1920 until 1967, when the province was split into three provinces in May 1967: Davao del Norte, Davao del Sur and Davao Oriental. After the division, Davao City was officially named its regional center.

==== Southern Mindanao and Davao Region ====
Region XI, then known as Southern Mindanao, originally covered 6 provinces (Compostela Valley, Davao del Norte, Davao del Sur, Davao Oriental, South Cotabato and Sarangani), and the cities of Davao, Digos, Panabo, Tagum, Samal, General Santos and Koronadal. Surigao del Sur was moved to the newly-created region Caraga on February 23, 1995.

In September 2001, Executive Order No. 36 was enacted which reorganized the regions in Mindanao. Region XI, then known as Southern Mindanao, was renamed Davao Region and the provinces of South Cotabato and Sarangani, and the cities of General Santos and Koronadal were moved to Region XII.

On October 12, 2022, the Regional Peace and Order Council declared the entire region "insurgency-free" after decades of being a stronghold for the communist insurgency, barring some scattered members of the New People's Army that are left in the region.

== Administrative divisions ==
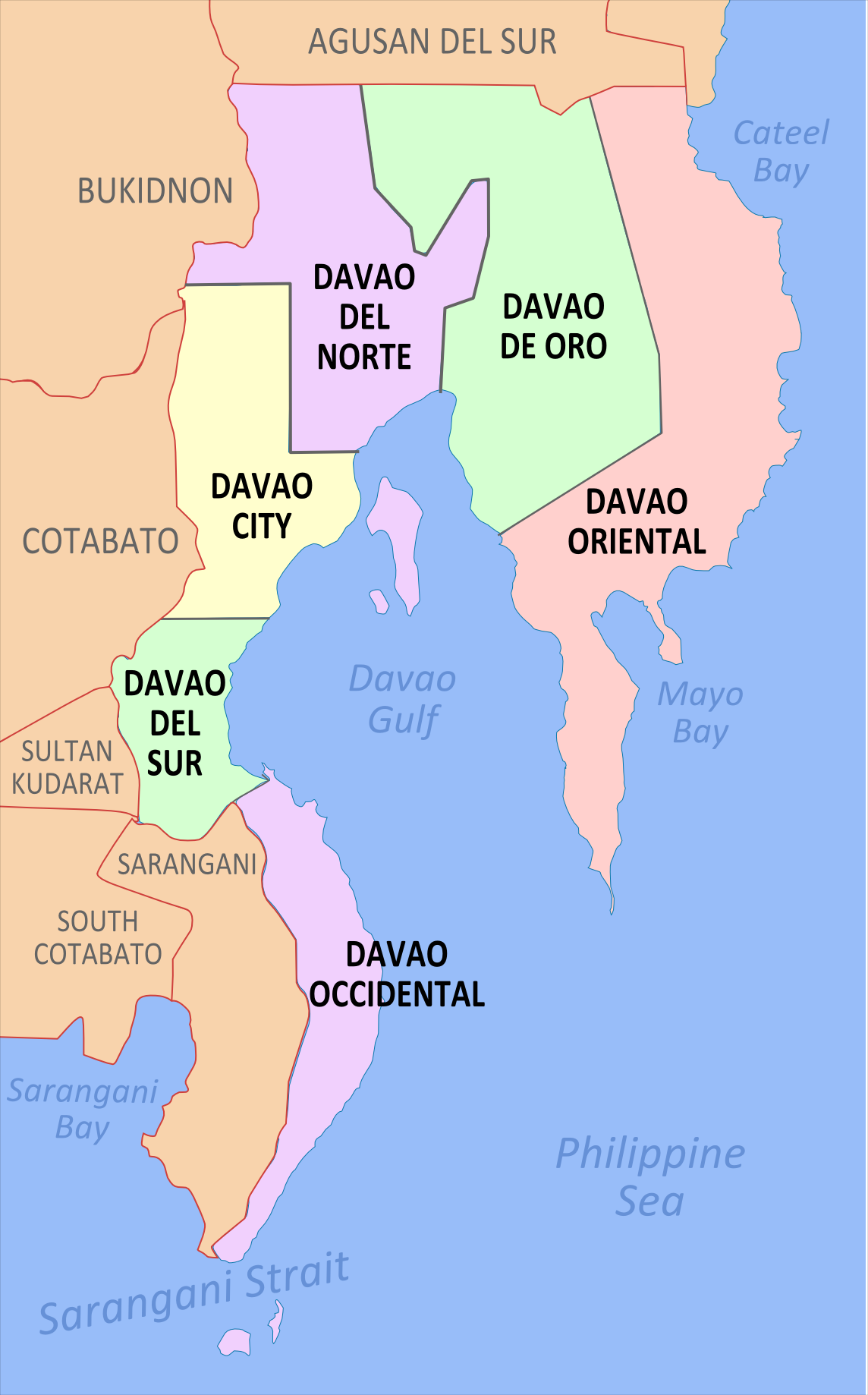
Map of Region XI

=== Provinces ===
Davao Region is subdivided into five provinces, 1 highly urbanized city, five component cities, 43 municipalities, and 1,162 barangays.

Province or HUC		Capital	Population (2020)		Area		Density		Cities	Muni.	Barangay
					km^{2}	sq mi	/km^{2}	/sq mi			
Davao de Oro		Nabunturan	14.6%	767,547	4,479.77	1,729.65	170	440	0	11	237
Davao del Norte		Tagum	21.5%	1,125,057	3,426.97	1,323.16	330	850	3	8	223
Davao del Sur		Digos	12.9%	632,588	2,163.98	835.52	290	750	1	9	232
Davao Occidental		Malita	6.0%	317,159	2,163.45	835.31	150	390	0	5	105
Davao Oriental		Mati	11.0%	576,343	5,679.64	2,192.92	100	260	1	10	183
Davao City	†	—	33.9%	1,776,949	2,443.61	943.48	730	1,900	—	—	182
Total				5,243,536	20,433.38	7,889.37	260	620	6	43	1,162
† Davao City is a highly urbanized city; figures are excluded from Davao del Sur.

==== Governors and vice governors ====
Province	Image	Governor	Political Partymed Office	Vice Governor
Davao de Oro		Raul G. Mabanglo	Independent	Dorothy M. Gonzaga
Davao del Norte		Edwin Jubahib	PFP	Clarice T. Jubahib
Davao del Sur		Yvonne Roña Cagas	Nacionalista	Marc Douglas C. Cagas IV
Davao Occidental		Franklin Bautista	Lakas	Lorna Bautista-Bandigan
Davao Oriental		Nelson L. Dayanghirang	Nacionalista	Ma. Glenda Monette R. Gayta

=== Cities ===
- † Regional center

City	Population (2020)	Area		Density		Founding year	City class	Income class	Province
		km^{2}	sq mi	/km^{2}	/sq mi				
† Davao City	1,776,949	2,443.61	943.48	730	1,900	1848 (cityhood: 1936)	Highly urbanized city	1st	Davao del Sur
Digos	188,376	287.10	110.85	660	1,700	1949 (cityhood: 2000)	Component	1st	Davao del Sur
Mati	147,547	588.63	227.27	250	650	1861 (cityhood: 2007)	Component	5th	Davao Oriental
Panabo	209,230	251.23	97.00	830	2,100	1949 (cityhood: 2001)	Component	3rd	Davao del Norte
Samal	116,771	301.30	116.33	390	1,000	1948 (cityhood: 1998)	Component	4th	Davao del Norte
Tagum	296,202	195.80	75.60	1,500	3,900	1941 (cityhood: 1998)	Component	1st	Davao del Norte

== Geography ==
The region is bounded on the north by Caraga, the province of Bukidnon in Northern Mindanao on the northwest, Soccsksargen on the west, Pacific Ocean (Philippine Sea) on the east, and on the south by the Celebes Sea. The region also shares a maritime border with North Sulawesi province of Indonesia.

=== Climate ===
The region has a generally uniform distribution of rainfall through the year. It lies outside the typhoon belt.

== Demographics ==
Population census of Davao Region

Year	Pop.	±% p.a.
1903	65,463	—
1918	108,222	+3.41%
1939	292,600	+4.85%
1948	364,854	+2.48%
1960	893,023	+7.74%
1970	1,475,936	+5.15%
1975	1,825,386	+4.35%
1980	2,198,683	+3.79%

Year	Pop.	±% p.a.
1990	2,933,743	+2.93%
1995	3,288,824	+2.16%
2000	3,676,163	+2.42%
2007	4,159,469	+1.72%
2010	4,468,563	+2.64%
2015	4,893,318	+1.74%
2020	5,243,536	+1.47%
2024	5,389,422	+0.66%

Source: Philippine Statistics Authority

Davao Region is the most populous region in Mindanao and the 7th most populous in the country, with a total of 5,389,422 inhabitants in 2024. Davao City, its regional capital, is also the largest city in Mindanao, with an area of 2,444 km^{2}, the largest in the country and one of the largest in the world, and has 1,632,991 inhabitants in 2015, making it the third most populous city in the country and the most populous city proper in the entire Visayas-Mindanao region. Davao Metropolitan Area, the primary economic and urban build-up area in the region, is also the most populous in the island and the third most populous in the country, with about 2,274,913 inhabitants in that year.

Most of the region's inhabitants speak Cebuano. are also spoken and widely used in schools, businesses, commerce, and industry. In the Davao City Metro Area, a linguistic phenomenon has developed whereby locals have either shifted to Filipino or significantly mix Filipino terms and grammar into their Cebuano speech. Minority indigenous groups of the region speak their own languages as well.

Chinese immigrants are widespread in the region, with a considerable population based in Davao City. Davao Chinatown is one of the two defined Chinatowns in the Philippines, alongside Binondo in Manila. A considerable population of Japanese are also found in the region, most of them also located in Davao City. Before World War II, Davao was and still is heavily populated by Japanese immigrants and their descendants, with Davao City being touted at one point in its history as the Little Tokyo of the Philippines.

=== Religion ===
The majority of the region's population are Christians, mostly Catholics (73.29%); and there are also Muslims (3.55%), Buddhists (0.03%), and Shintoists living in the region.

== Economy ==
Poverty incidence of Davao Region (%)

Source: Philippine Statistics Authority

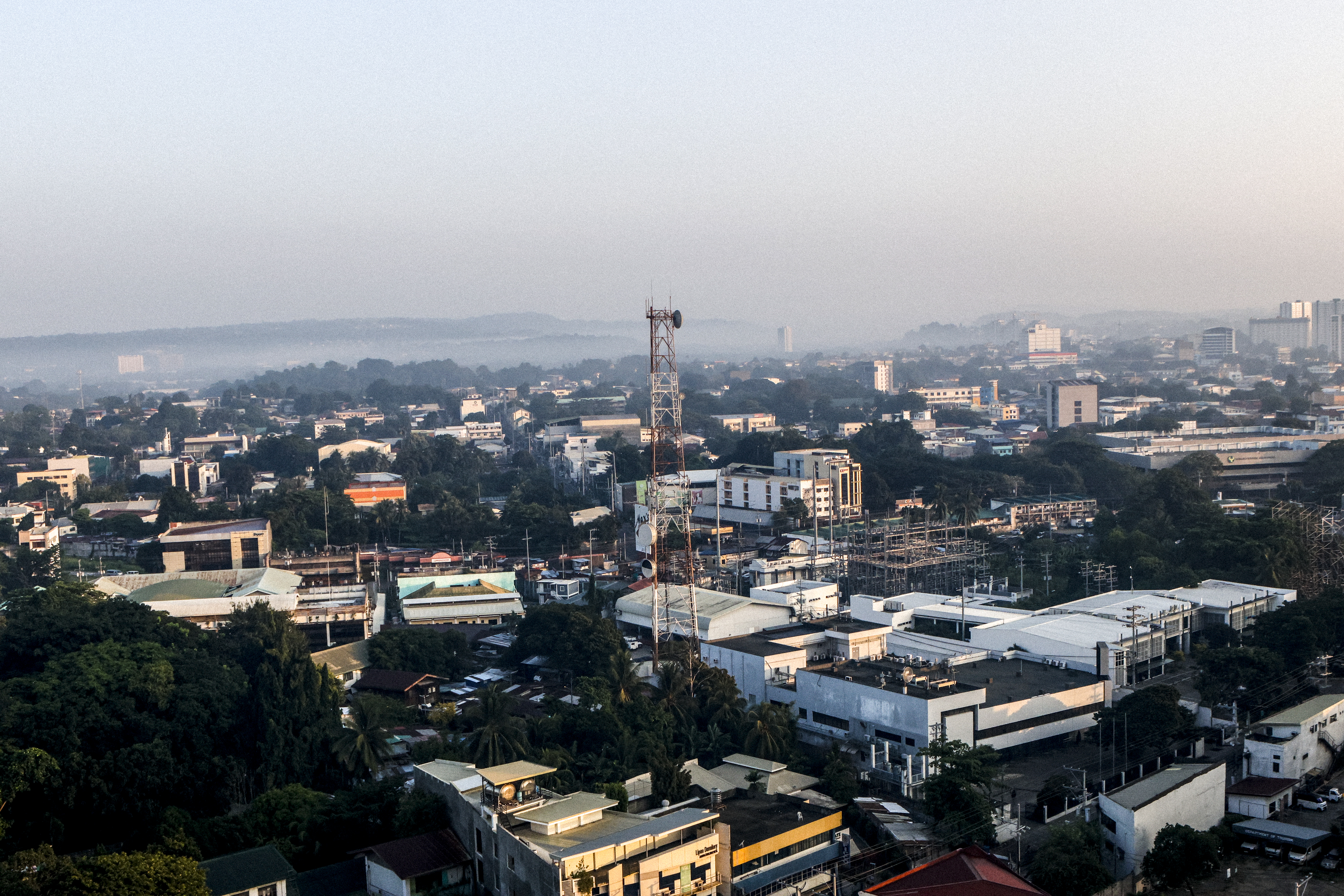
A view of Davao City in August 2026

While the region's economy is predominantly agri-based, it is now developing into a center for agro-industrial business, trade and tourism. Its competitive advantage is in agri-industry as its products, papayas, mangoes, bananas, pineapples, fresh asparagus, flowers, and fish products are exported internationally. The region can be a vital link to markets in other parts of Mindanao, Brunei Darussalam and parts of Malaysia and Indonesia. There is also a growing call center sector in the region, mostly centered in Davao City.

There is a gradual shift to industrialization as shown with industry's growth rate of 8.1% in 1996. Other economic activities are mining, fishery, forestry and agriculture. Due to the region's rise as the main commercial and industrial hub of Mindanao, many of its workers are oriented to urban services such as putting small-scale businesses and working in commercial industries in thriving urban areas like Davao, Tagum, and Digos. Both private and foreign investors and businessmen are putting up huge business centers in the region, fueling up its commercial growth rate.

The region is also venturing to online business like outsourcing.

=== Ports and airport ===
The region's principal ports are the Sasa International Seaport in Sasa and Santa Ana Pier in the Chinatown District, both in Davao City; Panabo Seaport in Davao del Norte; and Mati Seaport in Davao Oriental. The former two, both of which are located in Port of Davao in Davao City, can service both interisland and international shipments. Sasa International Container Port, also located in the Port of Davao, is the busiest in Mindanao.

The international airport in Davao City, Francisco Bangoy International Airport, is the largest and most developed in Mindanao, has the first longest runway in the island, and the third busiest in the country, after Ninoy Aquino International Airport and Mactan–Cebu International Airport. Being the only airport in the island that is currently catering for international destinations, it can handle both domestic and international flights, serving several domestic flights to Manila, Cebu, Bacolod, Iloilo, Zamboanga and other major Philippine cities, and international flights to Doha, Hong Kong, Manado, Quanzhou, and Singapore. Its ATC Tower is the most advanced in the country.

The region is accessible by land, air and sea. The region has adequate communications facilities, reliable power, and an abundant water supply.

In December 2016, President Duterte helped enter a contract with Chinese investors to create a new port in the region of Isla Verde in Davao. This involves the creation of three artificial islands by a set of Chinese companies including CCCC Dredging Group Co. Ltd for $200 million.

== Education ==
The government provides free education at the primary (grade school) and secondary (high school) levels. Some state-run universities in the region are the University of the Philippines Mindanao and the University of Southeastern Philippines. Private colleges / universities in Davao include Ateneo de Davao University, Assumption College of Davao, Holy Cross of Davao College, Holy Child College of Davao, and University of the Immaculate Conception. The literacy rate of the country is 93.9%; Davao City has a literacy rate of 98.05%.
