= Mandaya language =

Austronesian language spoken in the Philippines

Mandaya
- Caraga
- Native to: Philippines
- Region: some parts of Davao Oriental, Mindanao
- Native speakers: 250,000 (2010)
- Language family: Austronesian: Malayo-Polynesian; Philippine; Central Philippine; Mansakan; Mandayan; Mandaya

Language codes
- ISO 639-3: mry
- Glottolog: kara1489

Mandaya is an Austronesian language of Mindanao in the Philippines. It may be intelligible with Mansaka. Mandaya is a language native to some parts of Davao Oriental, Mindanao.

== Geographical distribution ==
Ethnologue reports that Mandaya is spoken in Manay, Caraga, Baganga, and Cateel municipalities of Davao Oriental Province, as well as in Davao del Norte Province.

== Varieties ==
Ethnologue lists the following varieties of Mandaya.

- Carraga Mandaya
- Cateeleño
- Manay Mandayan
- Mandaya
- Cataelano
- Karaga
- Sangab
- Mangaragan Mandaya

Pallesen (1985) lists the following varieties of Mandaya.

- Kabasagan
- Caragan
- Boso: spoken just inland from Mati, Davao Oriental
- Maragusan
- Mandaya Islam (or Kalagan Piso): spoken on the east coast of Davao Gulf directly east of Davao City, in Davao del Norte.

== Phonology ==
Vowels
	Front	Central	Back
Close	i		u
Open		a	

Consonants
		Labial	Alveolar	Palatal	Velar	Glottal
Nasal		m	n		ŋ	
Plosive	voiceless	p	t		k	ʔ
Plosive	voiced	b	d		ɡ	
Fricative			s			h
Lateral			l	ʎ		
Approximant		w		j		

/d/ can be heard as [r] in intervocalic positions.
