= Davao Gulf =

Gulf in Davao City, Philippines

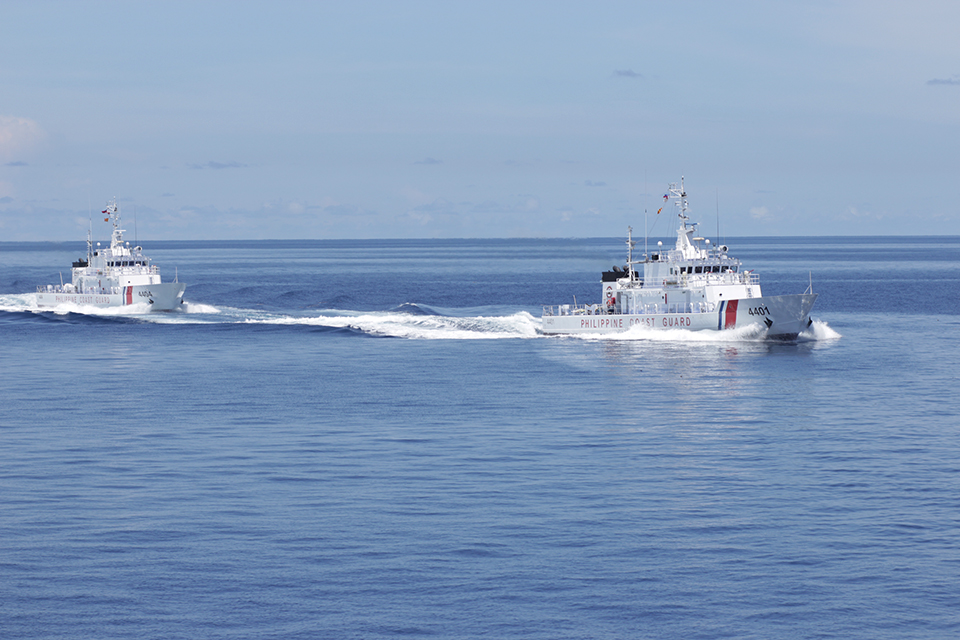
- BRP Capones and BRP Tubbataha traversing Davao Gulf

- Location within the Philippines Davao Gulf (Philippines)
- Location: Mindanao Island
- Coordinates: 6°30′00″N 125°58′35″E
- Type: Gulf
- Etymology: Davao
- Settlements: Banaybanay; Davao City; Digos; Don Marcelino; Governor Generoso; Hagonoy; Jose Abad Santos; Lupon; Mabini; Maco; Malalag; Malita; Padada; Panabo; Pantukan; Samal; San Isidro; Santa Cruz; Santa Maria; Sulop; Tagum

Davao Gulf is a gulf situated in the southeastern portion of Mindanao in the Philippines. It has an area of 5,200 km^{2} (2,000 sq mi) or about 520,000 hectares. Davao Gulf cuts into the island of Mindanao from the Philippine Sea. It is surrounded by all five provinces in the Davao Region. The largest island in the gulf is Samal Island. Davao City, on the Gulf's west coast, is the largest and busiest port on the gulf. The Bagobo and the Kaagan / Kalagan, who are the indigenous Lumad tribes endemic to Davao, are known inhabitants of the said gulf.

== Wildlife ==
The gulf water is regarded as one of the most diverse cetacean habitats in the nation, being home to at least 10 species of toothed whales and dolphins such as sperm whales and beaked whales. Also, whale sharks and sea cows are seen frequently. Furthermore, several ecological phenomena have been observed in Davao Gulf such as a previously unknown predator of the crown-of-thorns starfish, new species records, and new species discoveries underlining the uniqueness of the marine resources in Davao Gulf. Davao Gulf was included as a seascape site in the UNDP project Strengthening the Marine Protected Area System to Conserve Marine Key Biodiversity Areas (Smart Seas Philippines) (2014–2020), with Conservation International Philippines listed as a local partner.

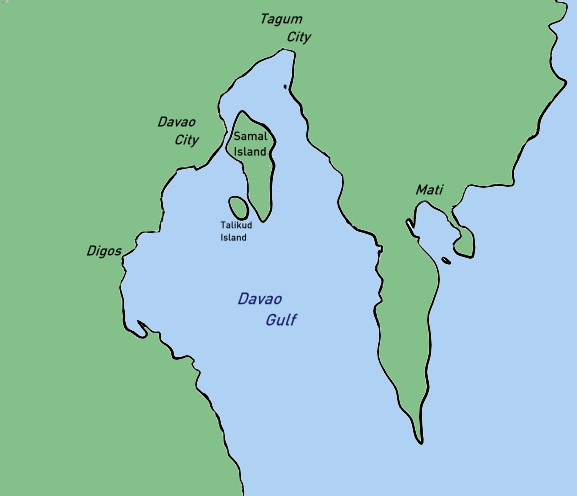
Map of Davao Gulf
