= San Isidro, Davao Oriental =

Municipality in Davao Oriental, Philippines

San Isidro
- Municipality
- Municipality of San Isidro
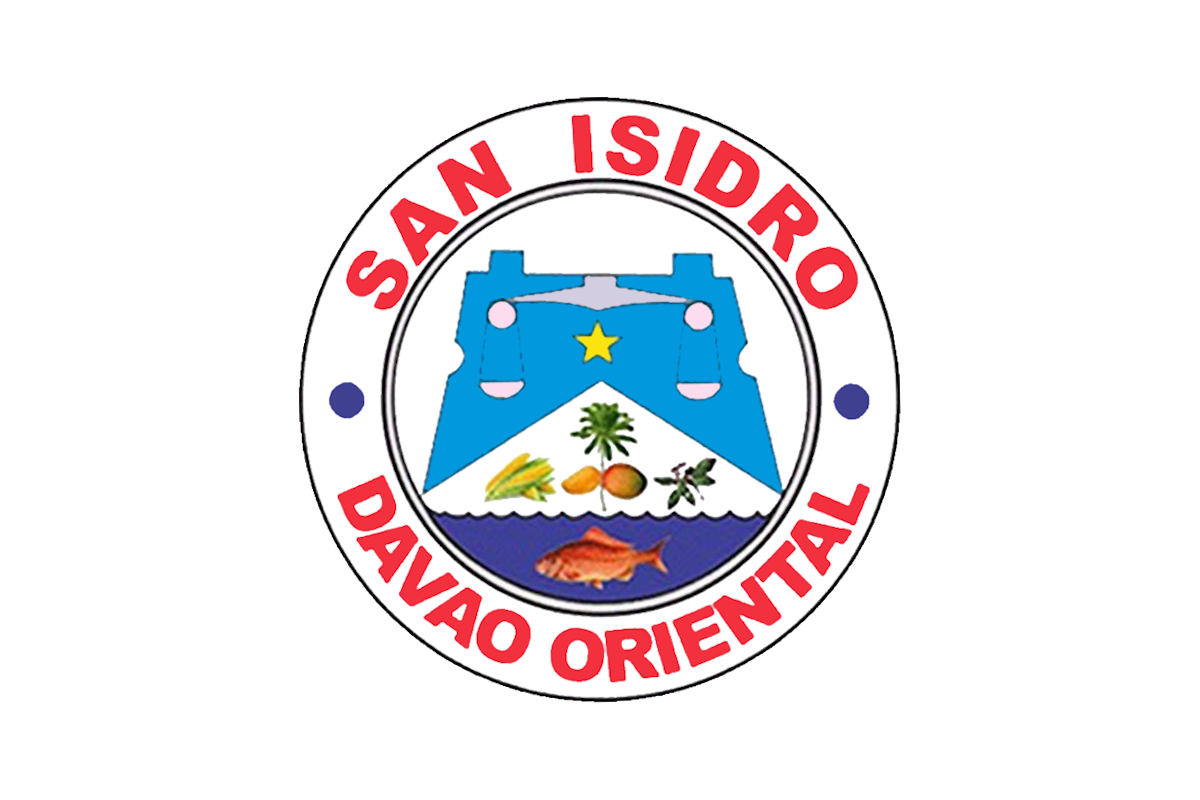
- Flag Seal

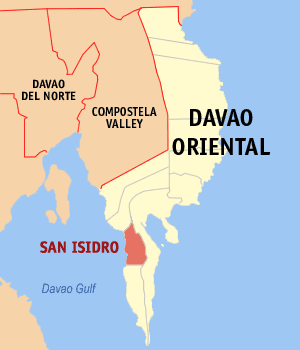
- Map of Davao Oriental with San Isidro highlighted
- Interactive map of San Isidro
- Location within the Philippines
- Coordinates: 6°50′10″N 126°05′20″E
- Country: Philippines
- Region: Davao Region
- Province: Davao Oriental
- District: 2nd district
- Founded: June 18, 1966
- Barangays: 16 (see Barangays)

Government
  - Type: Sangguniang Bayan
  - Mayor: Maria Angelica T. Dayanghirang
  - Vice Mayor: Panylin S. Acido
  - Representative: Cheeno Almario
  - Municipal Council: Members: Sayki Ruedas; Sherlyn L. Marcojos; Mary Mae L. Galagar; Mar Raneses; Edgardo Andit; Joel M. Mamac; Sheila Mae B. Ruelo; Fritz Yap
  - Electorate: 26,631 voters (2025)

Area
  - Total: 220.44 km^{2} (85.11 sq mi)
- Elevation: 124 m (407 ft)
- Highest elevation: 1,617 m (5,305 ft)
- Lowest elevation: 0 m (0 ft)

Population (2024 census)
  - Total: 35,984
  - Density: 163.24/km^{2} (422.78/sq mi)
  - Households: 8,727

Economy
  - Income class: 2nd municipal income class
  - Poverty incidence: 33.47% (2023)
  - Revenue: ₱ 203.1 million (2024)
  - Assets: ₱ 484.5 million (2024)
  - Expenditure: ₱ 202.9 million (2024)
  - Liabilities: ₱ 164.8 million (2024)

Service provider
  - Electricity: Davao Oriental Electric Cooperative (DORECO)
- Time zone: UTC+8 (PST)
- ZIP code: 8209
- PSGC: 1102510000
- IDD : area code: +63 (0)87
- Native languages: Davawenyo; Surigaonon; Cebuano; Kalagan; Kamayo; Tagalog
- Website: www.sanisidro.gov.ph

San Isidro, officially the Municipality of San Isidro (Cebuano: Lungsod ng San Isidro; Tagalog: Bayan ng San Isidro), is a municipality in the province of Davao Oriental, Philippines. According to the 2024 census, it has a population of 35,984 people.

San Isidro is one of the "gulf towns" of Davao Oriental whose shorelines stretch along Davao Gulf. Other gulf towns are Banaybanay, Lupon and Governor Generoso.

== History ==
The town of San Isidro was created by virtue of Republic Act No. 4744, enacted by the Philippine Congress on June 18, 1966. It started operating as a local government unit in January 1968. Its founder and the first mayor was Vicente Yu, Sr.

== Geography ==
=== Climate ===
Climate data for San Isidro, Davao Oriental
Month	Jan	Feb	Mar	Apr	May	Jun	Jul	Aug	Sep	Oct	Nov	Dec	Year
Mean daily maximum °C (°F)	29 (84)	29 (84)	30 (86)	30 (86)	30 (86)	30 (86)	29 (84)	29 (84)	30 (86)	30 (86)	29 (84)	30 (86)	30 (85)
Mean daily minimum °C (°F)	22 (72)	22 (72)	22 (72)	22 (72)	23 (73)	24 (75)	24 (75)	24 (75)	24 (75)	24 (75)	24 (75)	23 (73)	23 (74)
Average precipitation mm (inches)	168 (6.6)	141 (5.6)	143 (5.6)	141 (5.6)	216 (8.5)	235 (9.3)	183 (7.2)	169 (6.7)	143 (5.6)	176 (6.9)	226 (8.9)	168 (6.6)	2,109 (83.1)
Average rainy days	22.1	18.5	21.7	22.5	27.8	28.1	27.4	26.6	24.7	26.3	26.5	24.9	297.1
Source: Meteoblue

=== Barangays ===
San Isidro is politically subdivided into 16 barangays. Each barangay consists of puroks while some have sitios.

Seven barangays are along the coastline while the other nine are in the interior areas.

- Baon
- Bitaogan
- Cambaleon
- Dugmanon
- Iba
- La Union
- Lapu-lapu
- Maag
- Manikling
- Maputi
- Batobato (Poblacion)
- San Miguel
- San Roque
- Santo Rosario
- Sudlon
- Talisay

== Demographics ==
Population census of San Isidro
Year	Pop.	±% p.a.
1970	24,270	—
1975	28,360	+3.17%
1980	28,955	+0.42%
1990	28,936	−0.01%
1995	30,279	+0.85%
2000	31,705	+0.99%
2007	32,139	+0.19%
2010	32,424	+0.32%
2015	36,032	+2.03%
2020	33,664	−1.42%
2024	35,984	+1.61%
Source: Philippine Statistics Authority

Around 30% of the population belong to the indigenous Mandaya and Kalagan communities.

== Economy ==
Poverty incidence of San Isidro (%)

Source: Philippine Statistics Authority

San Isidro is largely planted with coconut, with much of its agricultural industry focuses on the production of copra. There are currently efforts to further diversify the output of the municipality's coconut-based industry from copra to other value-added coconut products such as coco-oil (which can be used as a fuel additive) and coco-coir. In 1992, a Crop Diversification Program of the local government unit (LGU) was implemented with mango as "export winner". In 1998, the town commenced its first Mango Festival as an indicator of the prominence of this high yielding fruit. Farmers are also engaged in growing the popular banana (cardava). Despite this, farmers still experience difficulties in increasing their income due to lack of agricultural technology specially those farming in the upland areas.

The aggressive anti-illegal fishing efforts of the LGU decreased dynamite fishing and able to establish fish sanctuaries in San Isidro waters. Most of the fishermen in this town used paddle-boat than motorized boat in fishing.

== Tourism ==
The municipality's seascape offers potential marine-based recreational industries on the as yet virtually undisturbed Tinaytay and Burias reefs a few kilometers offshore. In addition, its scenic nature spots include beaches untouched by urban development; the cascading Cawa-cawa Stepped Falls, and the 12 km^{2} Pygmy or Bonsai forests in the thickly forested highlands of the municipality.

Mount Hamiguitan Range Wildlife Sanctuary

One of the tourist spots easily accessible from San Isidro is the Mount Hamiguitan Range Wildlife Sanctuary. It is a UNESCO World Heritage Site as it currently serves as the habitat of different endangered species of flora and fauna. What makes it an even more critical habitat for these plants and animals is that eight of those threatened species are only found at Mount Hamiguitan. Endangered species in the site include the Philippine eagle and Philippine cockatoo.
