= Aragon Dam =

Dam in Davao Oriental, Philippines

- Location in Mindanao Location in the Philippines
- Country: Philippines
- Location: Aragon, Cateel, Davao Oriental
- Coordinates: 7°45′17.51″N 126°20′47.88″E
- Status: Operational
- Construction began: 2012
- Opening date: October 28, 2014
- Construction cost: ₱281 million

Dam and spillways
- Type of dam: Gravity
- Impounds: Cateel River
- Height: 5.5 m (18 ft)

Aragon Dam is an irrigation dam in Cateel, Davao Oriental, Philippines. It is situated in the barangay of Aragon, about 12 km (7.5 mi) west of the town of Cateel. The current dam was completed within just seven months although initial development started in 2012 was disrupted by Typhoons Bopha and Lingling (local names: Pablo and Agaton). The dam is part of the Cateel Irrigation Project, the biggest project by the Mindanao Rural Development Project, both in physical and financial terms, costing about ₱281 million. The dam is expected to provide irrigation to over 1,600 hectares of rice fields spanning eleven barangays of Cateel.

== See also ==
- Water supply and sanitation in the Philippines
- Energy in the Philippines
