= Aliwagwag Protected Landscape =

Protected Nature Conservation Area in the Davao Region of Mindanao, Philippines

- Aliwagwag Falls
- IUCN category V (protected landscape/seascape)
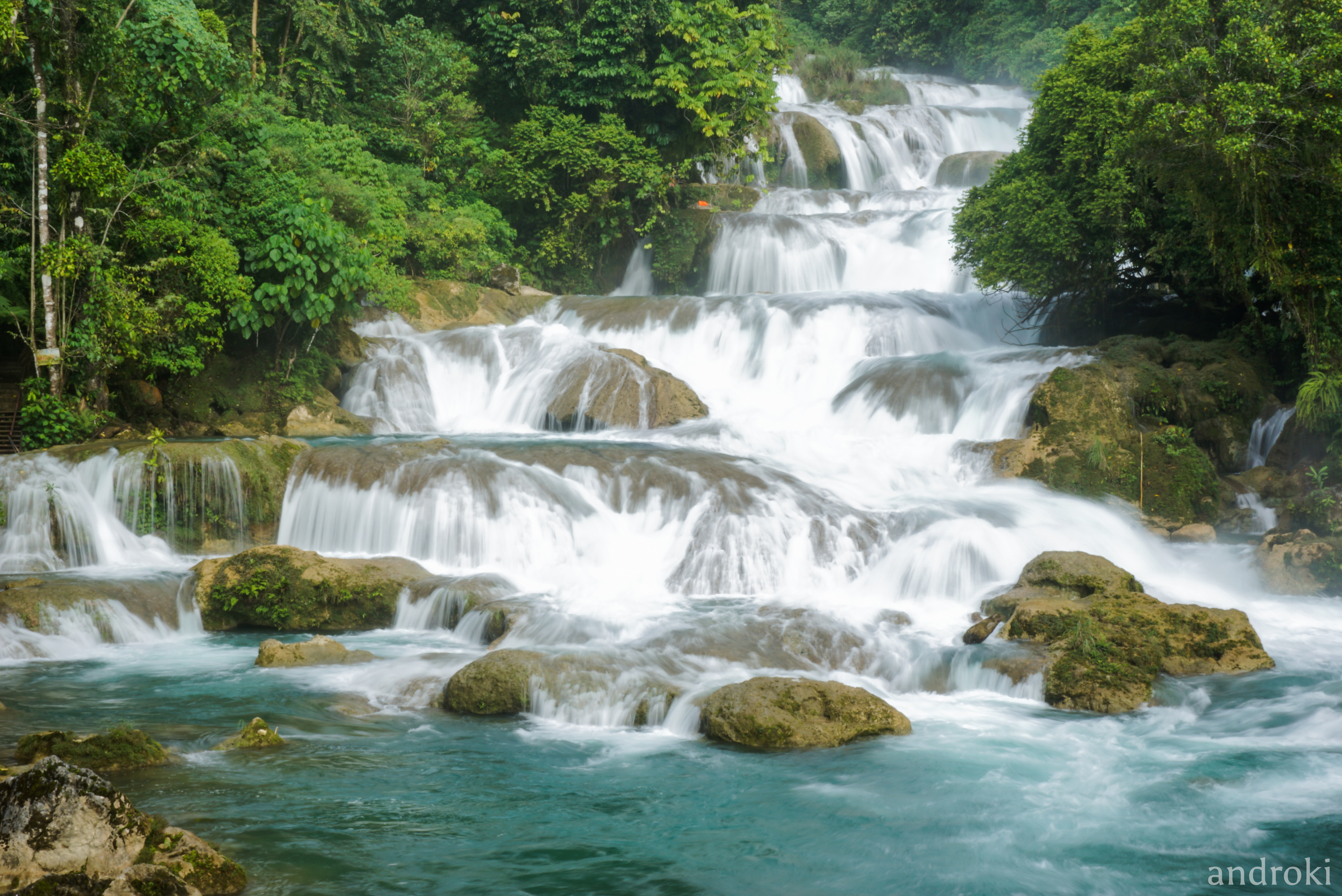
- Aliwagwag Falls as seen from the road (2018)

- Location within Philippines
- Location: Davao de Oro and Davao Oriental, Philippines
- Nearest city: Bislig
- Coordinates: 7°44′35″N 126°17′56″E
- Area: 10,491.33 hectares (25,924.6 acres)
- Established: April 5, 2011
- Governing body: Department of Environment and Natural Resources

The Aliwagwag Protected Landscape is a protected area that preserves a major drainage catchment in the southern Philippine island of Mindanao in the Davao Region. It contains the headwaters of the Cateel River in the southern Diuata Mountain Range which provides the water source and irrigation for surrounding rice fields and communities in Davao de Oro and Davao Oriental provinces. It was named after the remote rural village in the municipality of Cateel where Aliwagwag Falls, the country's highest waterfall, is located.

The protected landscape is part of the Philippines' National Integrated Protected Areas System and was established in 2011 through Proclamation No. 139 issued by President Benigno Aquino III. It was initially a component of the 1,927,400-hectare (4,763,000-acre) Agusan–Davao–Surigao Forest Reserve declared in 1931 through Proclamation No. 369 by Governor-General Dwight F. Davis which underwent several amendments over the years to open up a few areas in the mineral rich watershed to mining. The protected landscape was ultimately declared a national park under Republic Act No. 11038 (Expanded National Integrated Protected Areas System Act of 2018) signed by President Rodrigo Duterte in July 2018.

== Description ==
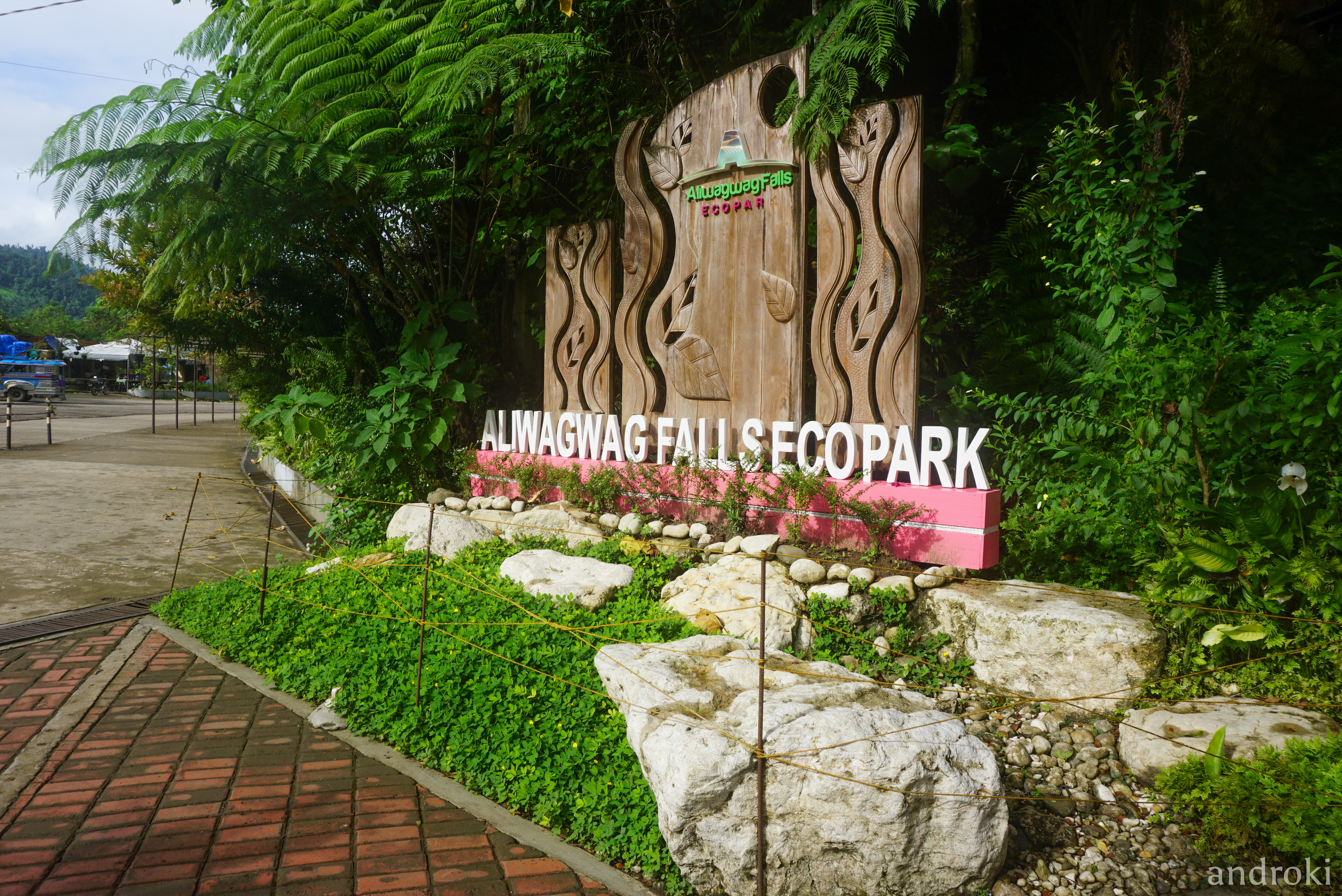
Entrance to Aliwagwag Falls Ecopark developed by the Cateel town government.

Aliwagwag is situated in the Eastern Mindanao Biodiversity Corridor which contains one of the largest remaining blocks of tropical lowland rainforest in the Philippines. It covers an area of 10,491.33 hectares (25,924.6 acres) and a buffer zone of 420.6 hectares (1,039 acres) in the hydrologically rich mountainous interior of the municipalities of Cateel and Boston in Davao Oriental as well as a portion of the municipality of Compostela in Davao de Oro. A tributary of the Cateel River which includes the Aliwagwag Falls flows through the park from the 1,660-metre (5,450 ft) high Mount Agtuuganon in the Diuata Range or Mindanao Pacific Cordillera. This multi-tiered waterfall with 84 steps ranging from 6–110 feet (1.8–33.5 m) has a combined height of 1,110 feet (340 m). To the south of the park lie the foothills of the 1,416-metre (4,646 ft) high Mount Pasian with the Cateel River running between the mountains and into the Cateel Bay which opens to the Philippine Sea and the Pacific Ocean.

The protected landscape is composed of lowland forests, with some areas of montane and mossy forests around the peaks of the mountains. A small Mandaya community who practice slash-and-burn agriculture and plantation farming can also be found in the park's lower slopes. Near the park's eastern edge are irrigation canals leading to the Cateel Dam in the village of Aragon which provides irrigation to over 1,600 hectares (4,000 acres) of rice fields in 11 villages in Cateel.

Aliwagwag is accessible via the new Compostela–Cateel Road that runs through the park and near the waterfall connecting northern Davao Oriental with Compostela. It is located just 15 miles (24 km) west from the Cateel Poblacion and some 200 miles (320 km) east of Davao City.

== Biodiversity ==
Aliwagwag occupies an important bird and biodiversity area in the Upper Cateel River Basin of the Agtuuganon–Pasian mountains. Its forest is home to the Philippine eagle as well as several other threatened and endemic bird species such as the Visayan miniature babbler, little slaty flycatcher and Lina's sunbird. The park also hosts the Philippine hawk-eagle, Philippine dwarf kingfisher, spotted imperial pigeon, giant scops owl, and Hombron's kingfisher. This landscape serves as a refuge for the Philippine brown deer (Rusa marianna) and Philippine warty pig (Sus philippensis). A new species of weevil, Metapocyrtus (Dolichocephalocyrtus) aliwagwag, was recently described from Aliwagwag. It is also home to the tallest trees in the Philippines, the Philippine rosewood, known locally as toog. In the waters of the upper Cateel River, a rare species of fish can be found called sawugnun by locals which is harvested as a delicacy.
