= Baganga =

Municipality in Davao Oriental, Philippines

- Municipality
- Municipality of Baganga
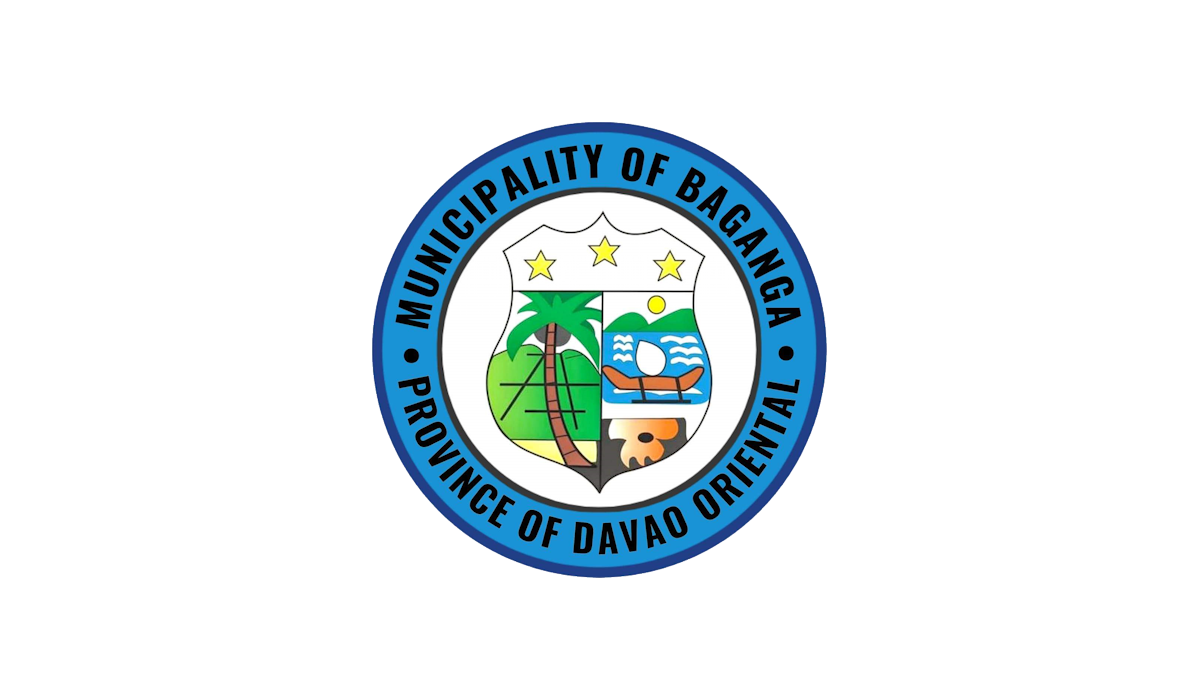
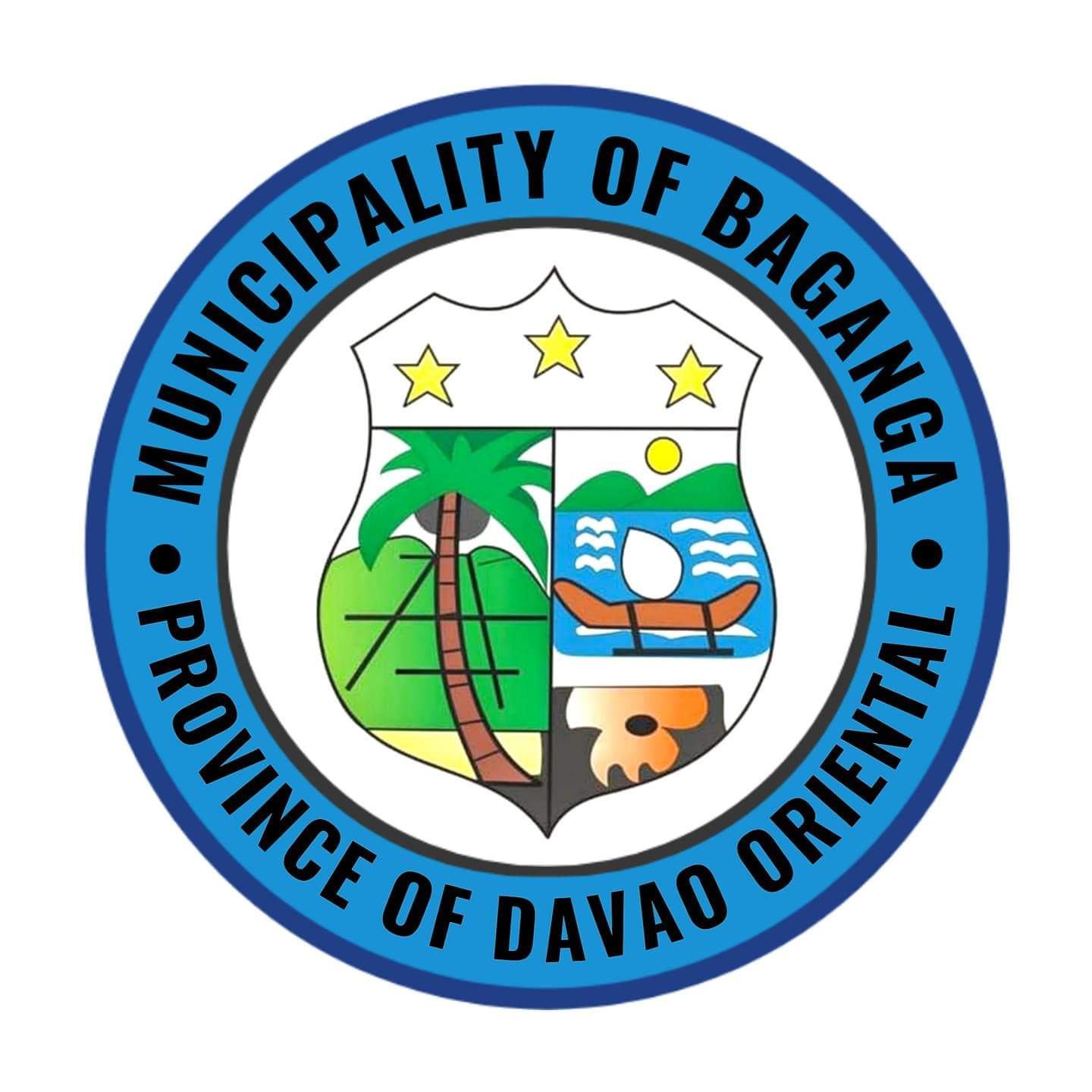
- Flag Seal
- Motto: "Life Starts Here"
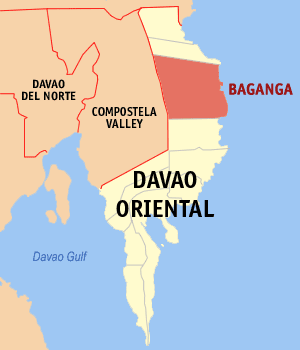
- Map of Davao Oriental with Baganga highlighted
- Interactive map of Baganga
- Location within the Philippines
- Coordinates: 7°34′31″N 126°33′30″E
- Country: Philippines
- Region: Davao Region
- Province: Davao Oriental
- District: 1st district
- Founded: October 29, 1903
- Barangays: 18 (see Barangays)

Government
  - Type: Sangguniang Bayan
  - Mayor: Laureano B. Taya
  - Vice Mayor: Karl J. Macayra
  - Representative: Nelson Dayanghirang Jr.
  - Municipal Council: Members: Loloy Balug; Kimod Cathy Aguilon; Paulo Serra; Ronelda Damuy; Paolo Monday; Celdo Pangga Gonzales; Aldrrin Lanaban; Ariel Ferrando
  - Electorate: 41,592 voters (2025)

Area
  - Total: 945.50 km^{2} (365.06 sq mi)
- Elevation: 46 m (151 ft)
- Highest elevation: 289 m (948 ft)
- Lowest elevation: 0 m (0 ft)

Population (2024 census)
  - Total: 59,796
  - Density: 63.243/km^{2} (163.80/sq mi)
  - Households: 14,556

Economy
  - Income class: 1st municipal income class
  - Poverty incidence: 41.48% (2023)
  - Revenue: ₱ 446.7 million (2024)
  - Assets: ₱ 614.4 million (2024)
  - Expenditure: ₱ 434.9 million (2024)
  - Liabilities: ₱ 74.77 million (2024)

Service provider
  - Electricity: Davao Oriental Electric Cooperative (DORECO)
- Time zone: UTC+8 (PST)
- ZIP code: 8204
- PSGC: 1102501000
- IDD : area code: +63 (0)87
- Native languages: Davawenyo; Cebuano; Kalagan; Kamayo; Mandaya; Mansaka
- Feast date: December 8
- Catholic diocese: Diocese of Mati
- Patron saint: Immaculate Conception
- Website: www.baganga.gov.ph

Baganga (Cebuano pronunciation: [ˈbaɡ.ɡaŋ.ɡa]), officially the Municipality of Baganga, is a municipality in the province of Davao Oriental, Philippines. According to the 2024 census, it has a population of 59,796 people, making it the third largest town in the province.

It is the largest among the municipalities and city in the province in terms of land area, and is considered the chief town of the province's 1st legislative district.

== Etymology ==
Baganga is believed to have derived its name from a thorny bush bearing plum-like fruits that was abundant at the time of the Spanish arrival. Other accounts suggest that the name refers to the wide mouth of a river that runs through the town's central area.

== History ==
The Mandaya tribes hosted festive receptions for early Spanish explorers and received correspondingly glowing descriptions from those whose accounts made it back to Spain.

The Villalobos Expedition arrived in the eastern coast of Davao on February 2, 1543. Villalobos called the bay in Baganga a "beautiful bay" and named it Malaga, after a province in Spain. The crew treated those with scurvy, buried the dead, and did repairs in the bay, but found Baganga unsuitable for settlement, and continued their expedition.

Under Spanish rule, Baganga was organized as part of the Encomienda de Bislig together with Cateel, Caraga and Hina-tuan of Surigao under Sargent Mayor Juan Camacho dela Peña. It was a Christian village under the Diocese of Cebu. In 1894, Baganga, together with other settlements, had its first Spanish priest, Fr. Gilbert, a Jesuit.

A failed uprising occurred in Baganga in September 1898, during the Philippine independence revolution. In the Philippine–American War, an occupation army was ordered to go to Davao and Mati under Hunter Liggett, and was welcomed by both towns. Liggett arrived in Baganga on December 22, 1899. Liggett did not station any troops in Baganga as he found the town satisfactory.

Baganga officially became a town on October 29, 1903, under Organic Act 21. At its creation, it included the barangays of Mah, an-ub, Dapnan, Lambajon, San Isidro, Mikit, Campawan, San Victor, Salingcomot, Saoquigue, Baculin, Bobonao, Batawan, Binondo, Ban-ao, Central and Kinablagan. Lucod was the 18th barangay created under Provincial Resolution No. 110.

The destruction made by the Japanese during World War II in 1941 has created awareness among residents for new development. The restoration of local officials in 1949 opened it as a venue for agri-based development. Coconut, abaca, and fruit trees were abundant, followed by root crops of various species suited to the soil.

== Geography ==
=== Climate ===
This municipality is 292 kilometers from Davao City via Mati City and 127 kilometers from Mati City. Baganga has a tropical rainforest climate (Af) with heavy to very heavy rainfall year-round.

Climate data for Baganga
Month	Jan	Feb	Mar	Apr	May	Jun	Jul	Aug	Sep	Oct	Nov	Dec	Year
Mean daily maximum °C (°F)	27.0 (80.6)	27.0 (80.6)	27.6 (81.7)	28.3 (82.9)	28.7 (83.7)	28.5 (83.3)	28.7 (83.7)	28.9 (84.0)	28.9 (84.0)	28.6 (83.5)	28.1 (82.6)	27.7 (81.9)	28.2 (82.7)
Daily mean °C (°F)	25.0 (77.0)	25.0 (77.0)	25.4 (77.7)	26.1 (79.0)	26.5 (79.7)	26.4 (79.5)	26.5 (79.7)	26.7 (80.1)	26.6 (79.9)	26.3 (79.3)	26.0 (78.8)	25.6 (78.1)	26.0 (78.8)
Mean daily minimum °C (°F)	23.7 (74.7)	23.5 (74.3)	23.7 (74.7)	24.2 (75.6)	24.7 (76.5)	24.7 (76.5)	24.7 (76.5)	24.9 (76.8)	24.8 (76.6)	24.5 (76.1)	24.3 (75.7)	24.1 (75.4)	24.3 (75.8)
Average rainfall mm (inches)	361 (14.2)	274 (10.8)	192 (7.6)	123 (4.8)	236 (9.3)	311 (12.2)	363 (14.3)	343 (13.5)	395 (15.6)	389 (15.3)	209 (8.2)	245 (9.6)	3,441 (135.4)
Source: Climate-Data.org

=== Barangays ===
Baganga is politically subdivided into 18 barangays. Each barangay consists of puroks while some have sitios.

- Baculin
- Ban-ao
- Batawan
- Batiano
- Binondo
- Bobonao
- Campawan
- Central
- Dapnan
- Kinablangan
- Lambajon
- Lucod
- Mahan-ub
- Mikit
- Salingcomot
- San Isidro
- San Victor
- Saoquigue

==== Salingcomot ====
Salingcomot is a barangay in the municipality of Baganga, in the province of Davao Oriental. Its population as determined by the 2020 Census was 3,013. This represented 5.13% of the total population of Baganga.

- Carolina lake
- Pilot view beach resort
- Mangrove area under rahabilation of DENR Located at Sitio Batinao
- Philippines army (67IB Aguila)
- Batinao Salingcomot Rural Women's Association(BASRUWA)
- Saligcomot Elementary School
- Panjugan Elementary School

==== Campawan ====
This barangay is home to a lot of waterfalls, and one of the major attraction of "Campawan" is the so-called "Curtain Falls".

==== Dapnan ====
Dapnan is home to many white-sand beaches in Baganga like the famous Agawon Beach. The major industry of this small barangay is the coconut industry.

Tourist spots:

- Sunrise Boulevard

==== Kinablangan ====
On October 18 Kinablanganion celebrate the Araw Ng Kinablangan (Day of Kinablangan) or the Niyogan Festival. The economic strength is agriculture and fishing.

Schools:

- Kinablangan Elementary School
- Dr. Beato C. Macayra National High School
- POO Elementary School
- Kiagbaan Elementary School
- Ibañez Elementary School

Tourist spots:

- Floating Cottage
- Balite Hot Spring (locally called "Mainit")
- Punta (Poo Island)
- Sandbar, Poo Kinablangan

==== Mahan-ub ====
Mahan-ub is derived its name from the river "mahan-ub". This Barangay is located in a remote area, and subdivided into 12 puroks (Olin, Catabuanan II, Banahao, Pagsingitan, Abuyuan, Coog, Mercedez, R. C., Kaputian, Kasunugan, Kati-han II, Bisaya). The present Barangay Chairman is Roy Aguilon Nazareno. Their economic strength is agruculture, producing rice, coconut, abaca, and logs. They celebrate the annual fiesta every June 13 in honor of the patron San Antonio de Padua. They celebrate the Araw ng Mahan-ub every June 11 the Carabao Festival.

Schools:

- R. C. Macayra Elementary School
- Coog Elementary School

Tourist spots:

- Katiquipan Falls

==== San Victor ====
San Victor is a small barangay located on San Victor Island. The major sources of income are subsistence farming and fishing. The barangay captain is Ike Fontillas.

School:

- San Victor Elementary School

==== Saoquigue ====
Saoquigue is a remote barangay, subdivided into 8 purok's or wards. The present Barangay Chairman is Mr. Balug. The predominant source of income is agriculture (coconut) and fishing, with some shops and marketing businesses buying copra and charcoal from coconut shells.

School:

- Saoquigue Elementary School

== Demographics ==
Population census of Baganga
Year	Pop.	±% p.a.
1903	2,985	—
1918	6,175	+4.97%
1939	8,737	+1.67%
1948	10,002	+1.51%
1960	17,993	+5.01%
1970	27,678	+4.40%
1975	32,670	+3.38%
1980	40,039	+4.15%
1990	37,719	−0.60%
1995	39,750	+0.99%
2000	43,122	+1.76%
2007	48,355	+1.59%
2010	53,426	+3.70%
2015	56,241	+0.98%
2020	58,714	+0.91%
2024	59,796	+0.44%
Source: Philippine Statistics Authority

=== Language ===
Baganga, as part of Davao Oriental, uses the Southern Kamayo dialect. The Southern Kamayo is quite different from the Kamayo language of Bislig, Surigao Del Sur. Southern Kamayo is also spoken in Southern Lingig, Surigao del Sur, in Cateel, Caraga and some parts of Davao Oriental. It is also related to Surigaonon and Butuanon.

Dialect variations are caused by mixed dialect communications between the Mandaya, Cebuano and other immigrants now living in the area. A suffix is added in most adjectives. Example: The word gamay in Cebuano (English: "small") is gamayay in Baganga. But you can't use the "ay" suffix always with adjectives. For instance, the word dako (English; "big") is spoken as "bagas-AY" or "bagasay" instead of saying "dako-ay". dutayay (English: "very small")

== Economy ==
Poverty incidence of Baganga (%)

Source: Philippine Statistics Authority

== See also ==
- Baganga Protected Landscape
