= Baganga Protected Landscape =

- IUCN category V (protected landscape/seascape)
- Location within Philippines
- Location: Davao Oriental, Philippines
- Nearest city: Mati
- Coordinates: 7°26′30″N 126°32′0″E
- Area: 114.88 hectares (283.9 acres)
- Established: December 8, 1987 (Watershed forest reserve); April 23, 2000 (Protected landscape)
- Governing body: Department of Environment and Natural Resources

The Baganga Protected Landscape, in Mindanao in the Philippines, is one of four protected watershed areas of the province of Davao Oriental. It was established in 1987 as the Baganga Watershed Forest Reserve with an area of 114 hectares (280 acres). The watershed was declared a protected landscape in 2000.

== Wildlife ==
The Baganga Protected Landscape is home to the Philippine long-tailed macaque and Asian water monitor. It also supports the following bird species:

- Philippine dwarf kingfisher
- Philippine bullfinch
- Philippine flowerpecker
- Pygmy flowerpecker
- Philippine coucal
- Olive-backed sunbird
- Philippine frogmouth
- Java sparrow
- Mountain white-eye
- Dark-throated oriole
- Philippine bulbul
- Yellowish bulbul
- Brown shrike
- Tiger shrike
- White-bellied munia
- Lesser coucal
- White-collared kingfisher
- White-throated kingfisher
- Mangrove blue flycatcher
- Gray wagtail
- Forest wagtail
- Little crow
- Pacific swallow
- Barn swallow

== Geography ==
It covers the Upper Baganga River Basin in the Mindanao Pacific Cordillera, the primary source of water for the Baganga Water District. The Baganga River, the main river channel of the municipality of Baganga, flows on a northeastern direction towards the Baganga Bay. The river system includes the Languyon River, Daquit River, Mahanob River, Dapnan River and Kinablang River all emptying into the Philippine Sea.
