= Davao Oriental's 2nd congressional district =

Legislative district of the Philippines

- Constituency for the House of Representatives of the Philippines
- Location of Davao Oriental within the Philippines
- Province: Davao Oriental
- Region: Davao Region
- Population: 352,532 (2020)
- Electorate: 241,237 (2022)
- Major settlements: 5 LGUs: Cities; Mati; Municipalities; Banaybanay; Governor Generoso; Lupon; San Isidro
- Area: 2,469.73 km^{2} (953.57 sq mi)

Current constituency
- Created: 1987
- Representative: Cheeno Almario
- Political party: NPC
- Congressional bloc: Majority

Davao Oriental's 2nd congressional district is one of the two congressional districts of the Philippines in the province of Davao Oriental. It has been represented in the House of Representatives since 1987. The district covers the provincial capital city of Mati and the southern municipalities of Banaybanay, Governor Generoso, Lupon and San Isidro. It is currently represented in the 20th Congress by Cheeno Almario of the Nationalist People's Coalition (NPC).

== Representation history ==
| # | Image | Member | Term of office | | Congress | Party | Electoral history | Constituent LGUs |
| # | Image | Member | Start | End | Congress | Party | Electoral history | Constituent LGUs |
|---|---|---|---|---|---|---|---|---|
=== Davao Oriental's 2nd district for the House of Representatives of the Philippines ===
District created February 2, 1987 from Davao Oriental's at-large district.
| 1 | | Thelma Z. Almario | June 30, 1987 | June 30, 1998 | 8th | PDP–Laban | Elected in 1987. | 1987–present Banaybanay, Governor Generoso, Lupon, Mati, San Isidro |
| 1 | | Thelma Z. Almario | June 30, 1987 | June 30, 1998 | 9th | LDP | Re-elected in 1992. | 1987–present Banaybanay, Governor Generoso, Lupon, Mati, San Isidro |
| 1 | | Thelma Z. Almario | June 30, 1987 | June 30, 1998 | 10th | Lakas | Re-elected in 1995. | 1987–present Banaybanay, Governor Generoso, Lupon, Mati, San Isidro |
| 2 | | Joel Mayo Z. Almario | June 30, 1998 | June 30, 2007 | 11th | Lakas | Elected in 1998. | 1987–present Banaybanay, Governor Generoso, Lupon, Mati, San Isidro |
| 2 | | Joel Mayo Z. Almario | June 30, 1998 | June 30, 2007 | 12th | Lakas | Re-elected in 2001. | 1987–present Banaybanay, Governor Generoso, Lupon, Mati, San Isidro |
| 2 | | Joel Mayo Z. Almario | June 30, 1998 | June 30, 2007 | 13th | Lakas | Re-elected in 2004. | 1987–present Banaybanay, Governor Generoso, Lupon, Mati, San Isidro |
| (1) | | Thelma Z. Almario | June 30, 2007 | June 30, 2016 | 14th | Lakas | Elected in 2007. | 1987–present Banaybanay, Governor Generoso, Lupon, Mati, San Isidro |
| (1) | | Thelma Z. Almario | June 30, 2007 | June 30, 2016 | 15th | Lakas | Re-elected in 2010. | 1987–present Banaybanay, Governor Generoso, Lupon, Mati, San Isidro |
| (1) | | Thelma Z. Almario | June 30, 2007 | June 30, 2016 | 16th | Lakas | Re-elected in 2013. | 1987–present Banaybanay, Governor Generoso, Lupon, Mati, San Isidro |
| (2) | | Joel Mayo Z. Almario | June 30, 2016 | June 30, 2022 | 17th | PDP–Laban | Elected in 2016. | 1987–present Banaybanay, Governor Generoso, Lupon, Mati, San Isidro |
| (2) | | Joel Mayo Z. Almario | June 30, 2016 | June 30, 2022 | 18th | PDP–Laban | Re-elected in 2019. | 1987–present Banaybanay, Governor Generoso, Lupon, Mati, San Isidro |
| 3 | | Cheeno Miguel D. Almario | June 30, 2022 | Incumbent | 19th | Lakas | Elected in 2022. | 1987–present Banaybanay, Governor Generoso, Lupon, Mati, San Isidro |
| 3 | | Cheeno Miguel D. Almario | June 30, 2022 | Incumbent | 20th | NPC | Re-elected in 2025. | 1987–present Banaybanay, Governor Generoso, Lupon, Mati, San Isidro |

== Election results ==
=== 2025 ===
| Candidate | Party | Votes | % |
|---|---|---|---|
| Cheeno Almario (incumbent) | Lakas–CMD | 128,454 | 60.93 |
| Sito Rabat | Partido Federal ng Pilipinas | 82,358 | 39.07 |
| Total | | 210,812 | 100.00 |
| Valid votes | | 210,812 | 94.15 |
| Invalid/blank votes | | 13,107 | 5.85 |
| Total votes | | 223,919 | 100.00 |
| Registered voters/turnout | | 258,767 | 86.53 |
| Lakas–CMD hold | | | |
Source: Commission on Elections

=== 2022 ===
| Candidate | Party | Votes | % |
|---|---|---|---|
| Cheeno Almario | PDP–Laban | 110,892 | 58.43 |
| Louie Rabat | Nacionalista Party | 78,905 | 41.57 |
| Total | | 189,797 | 100.00 |
| Total votes | | 208,063 | – |
| Registered voters/turnout | | 241,237 | 86.25 |
| PDP–Laban hold | | | |
Source: Commission on Elections

== See also ==
- Legislative districts of Davao Oriental
