= Davao Oriental =

Province of Davao Region, Philippines

- Province
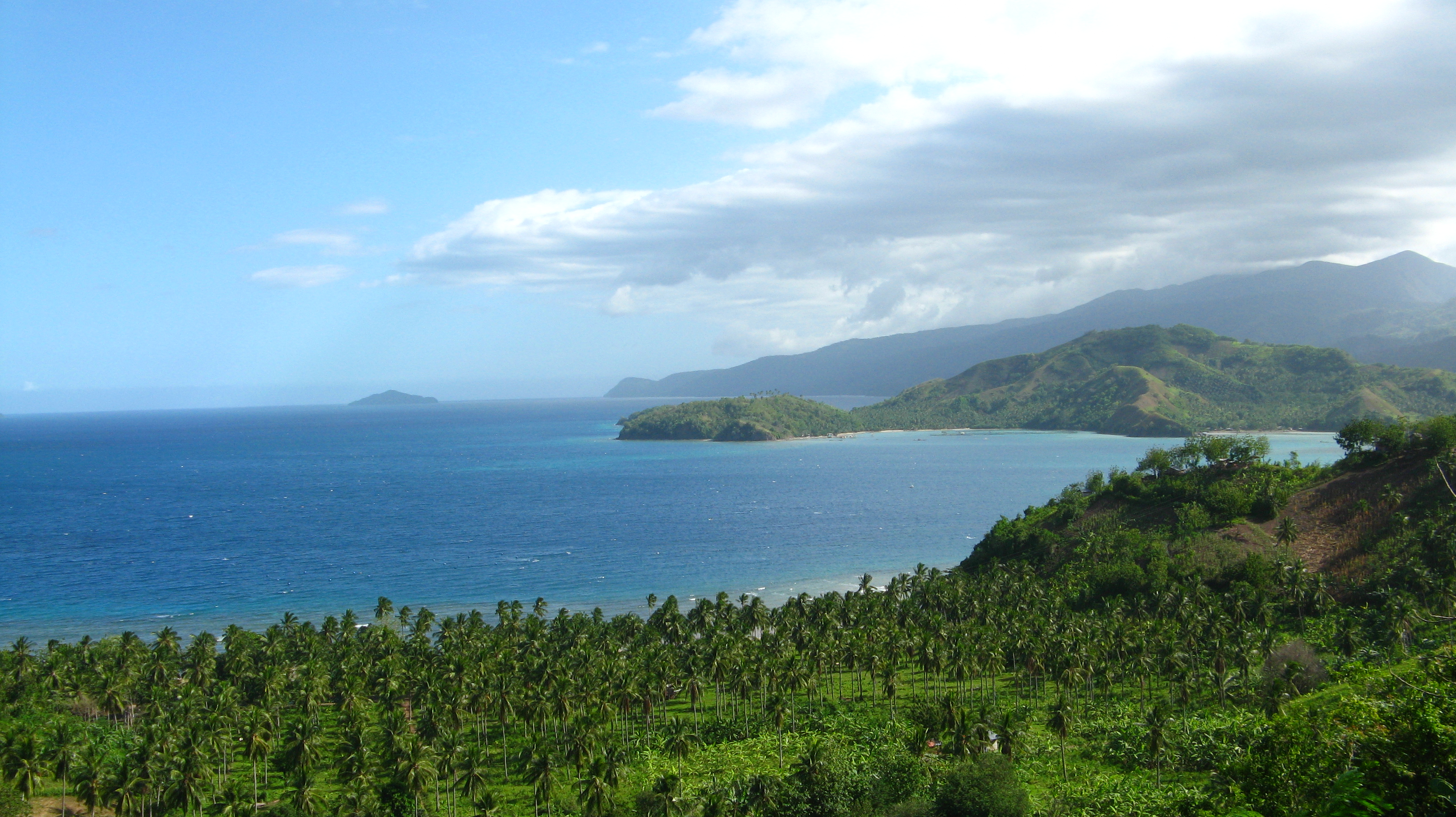
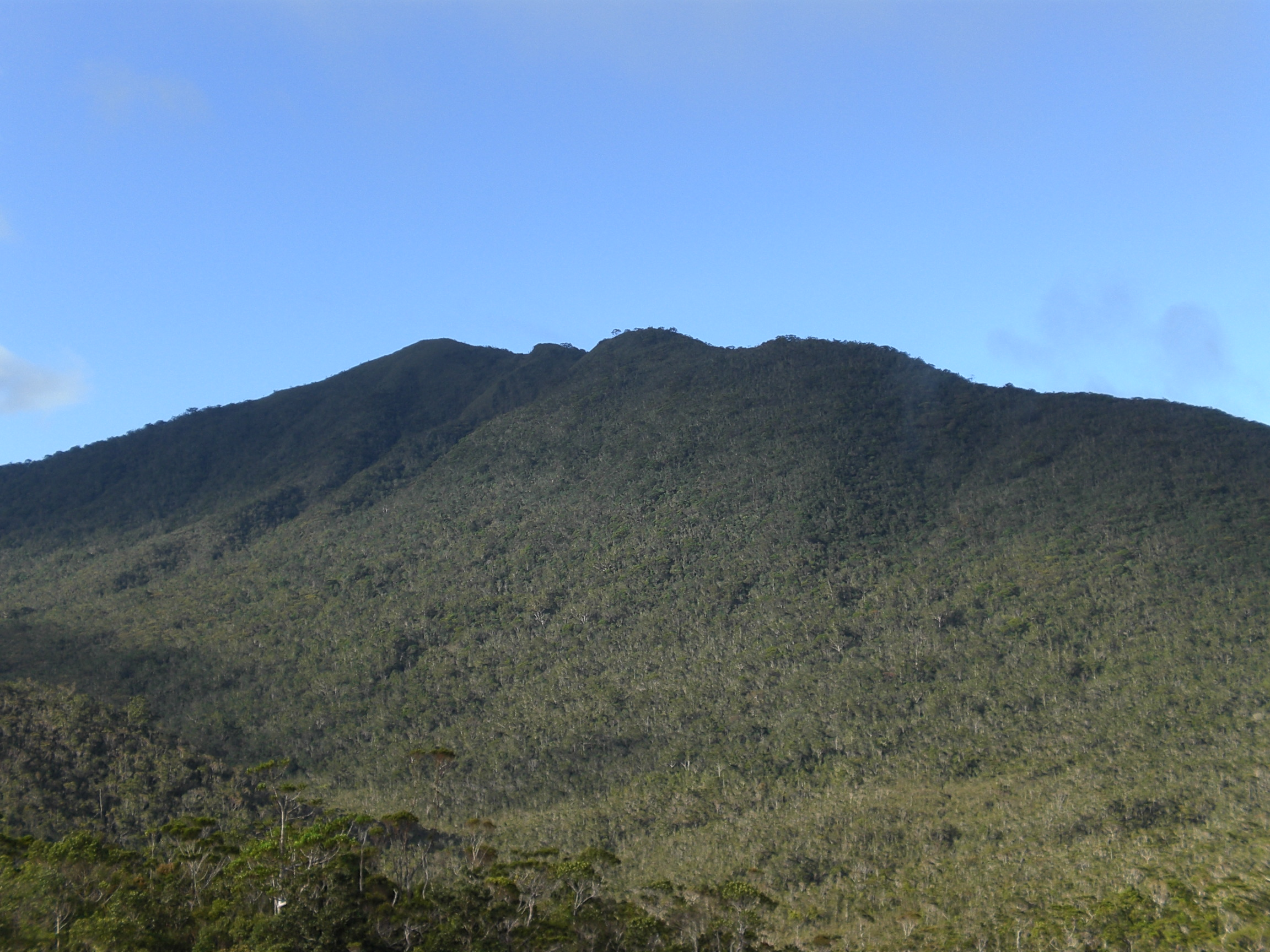
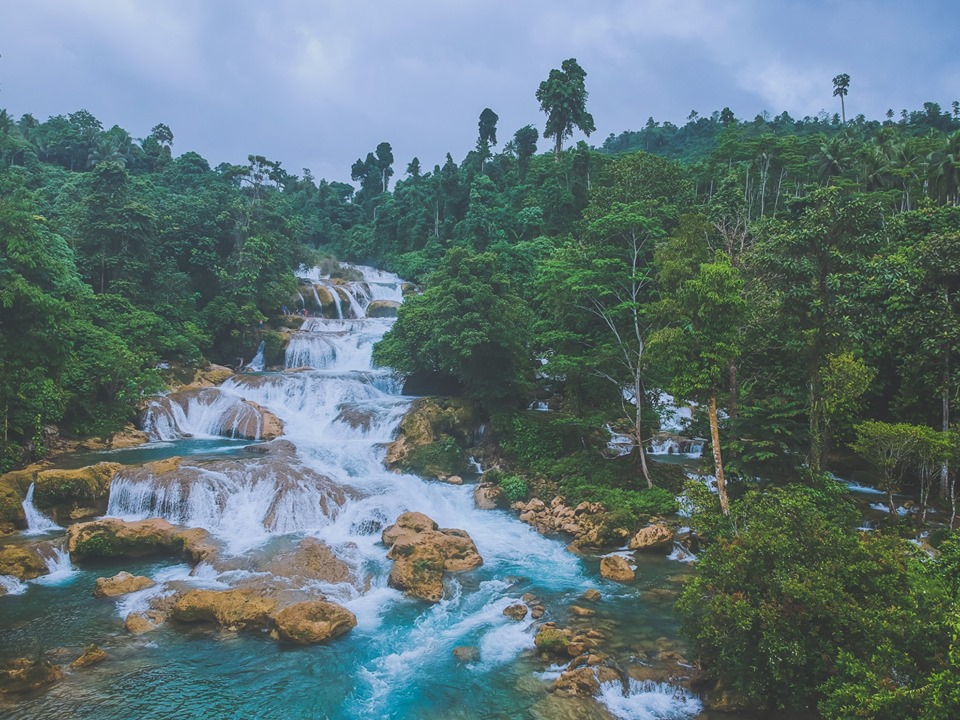
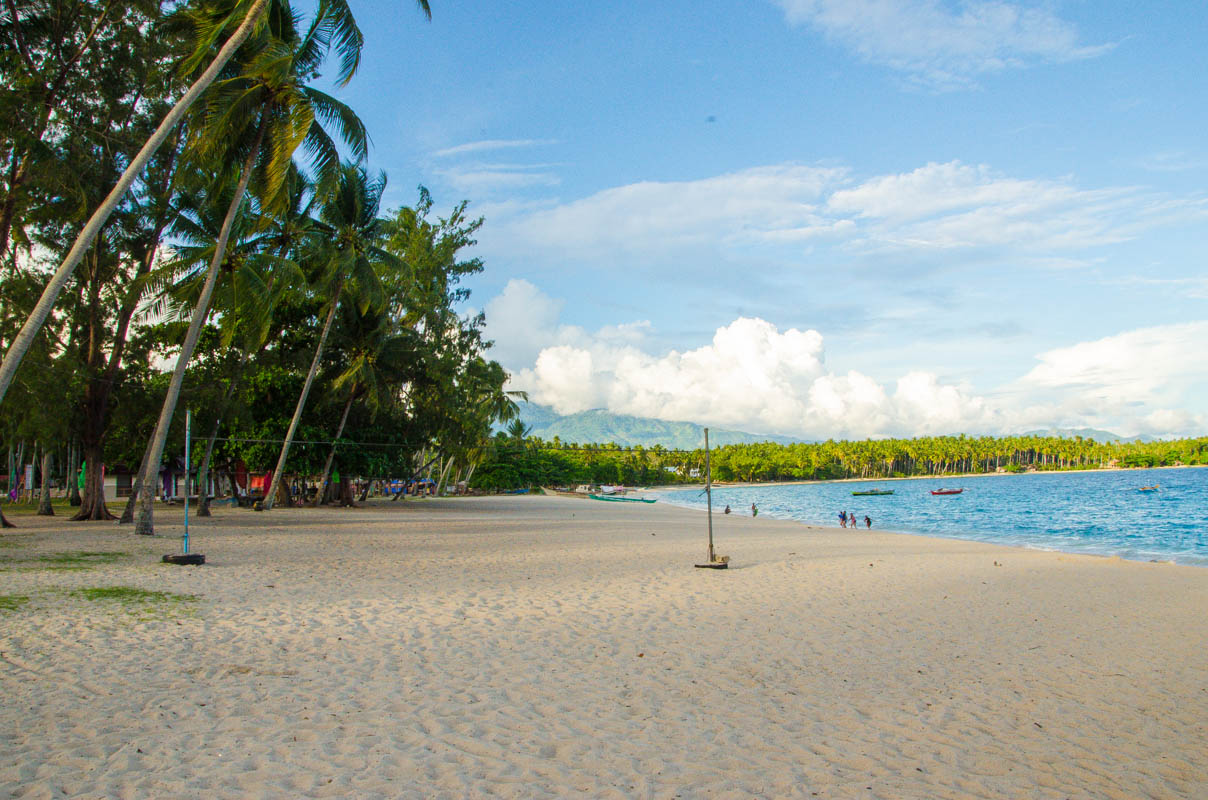
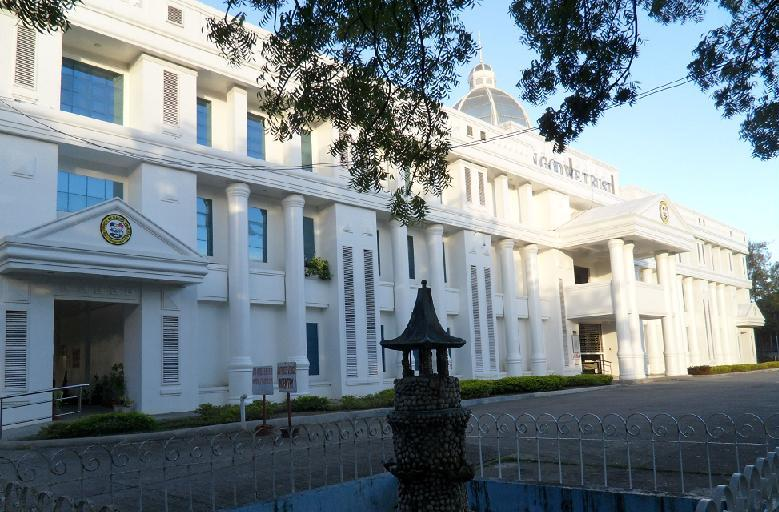
- (from top: left to right) Pujada Bay in Mati, Mount Hamiguitan, Aliwagwag Falls in Cateel, Dahican Beach, Subangan Museum in Mati and Provincial Capitol Building in Mati.

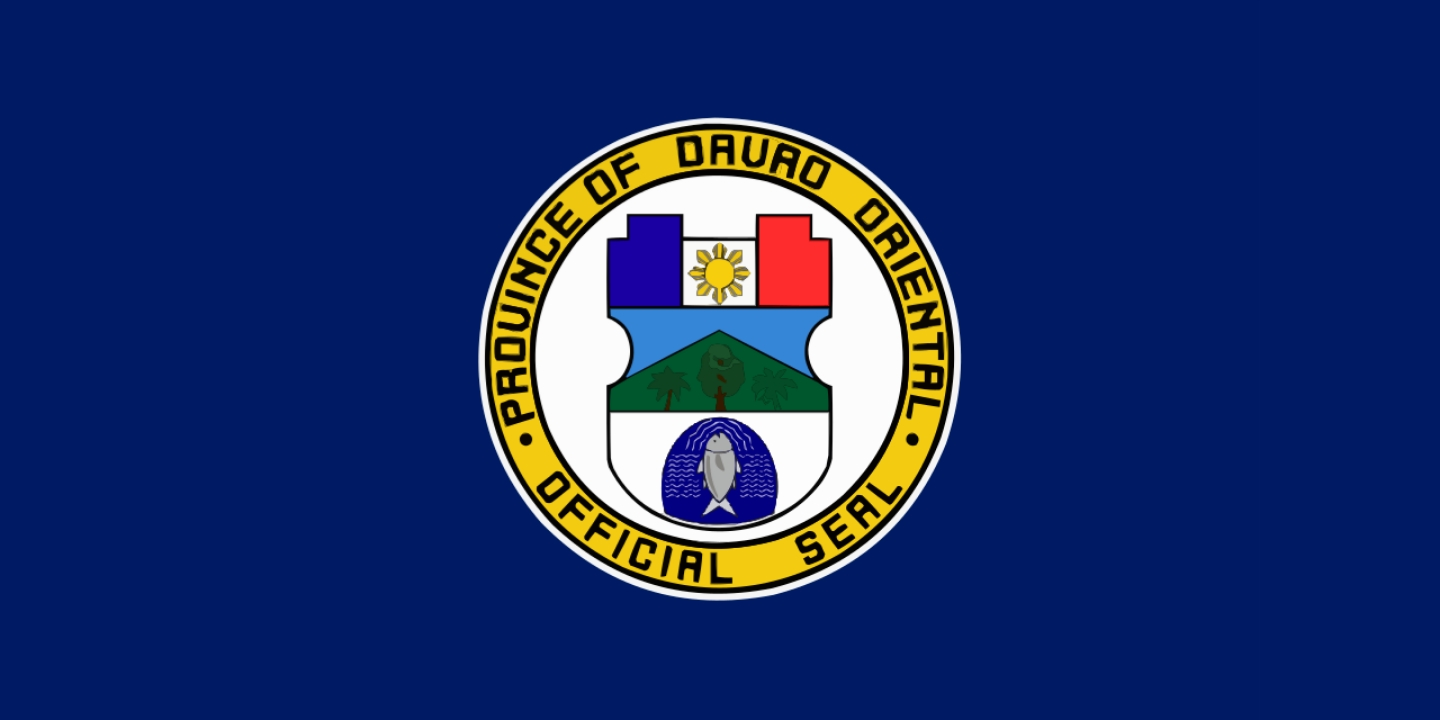
- Flag Seal
- Etymology: Davao Oriental (i.e., "Eastern Davao")
- Nickname: Sunrise and Coconut Capital of the Philippines
- Anthem: Banwa na Madayaw
- Location in the Philippines
- Interactive map of Davao Oriental
- Coordinates: 7°10′N 126°20′E
- Country: Philippines
- Region: Davao Region
- Founded: May 8, 1967
- Capital and largest city: Mati

Government
  - Governor: Nelson L. Dayanghirang (Nacionalista)
  - Vice Governor: Glenda Rabat-Gayta (Nacionalista)
  - Legislature: Davao Oriental Provincial Board
  - Electorate: 433,645 voters (2025)

Area
  - Total: 5,679.64 km^{2} (2,192.92 sq mi)
  - Rank: 14th out of 82
- Highest elevation (Mount Kampalili): 2,320 m (7,610 ft)

Population (2024 census)
  - Total: 590,042
  - Rank: 54th out of 82
  - Density: 103.887/km^{2} (269.067/sq mi)
  - Rank: 70th out of 82
  - Households: 140,064
- Demonym(s): Oriental Dabawenyo; Estedavaoeño

Divisions
  - Independent cities: 0
  - Component cities: 1: Mati
  - Municipalities: 10: Baganga; Banaybanay; Boston; Caraga; Cateel; Governor Generoso; Lupon; Manay; San Isidro; Tarragona
  - Barangays: 183
  - Districts: Legislative districts of Davao Oriental

Economy
  - Income class: 1st provincial income class
  - Poverty incidence: 29.1% (2023)
  - Revenue: ₱ 2,513 million (2024)
  - Assets: ₱ 11,613 million (2024)
  - Expenditure: ₱ 2,451 million (2024)
  - Liabilities: ₱ 2,509 million (2024)
- Time zone: UTC+8 (PHT)
- PSGC: 1102500000
- IDD : area code: +63 (0)87
- ISO 3166 code: PH-DAO
- Spoken languages: Davawenyo; Cebuano; Kalagan; Mandaya; Kamayo; Mansaka; Filipino; English
- Website: www.davaooriental.gov.ph

Davao Oriental (Cebuano: Sidlakang Dabaw; Filipino: Silangang Davao), officially the Province of Davao Oriental (Cebuano: Lalawigan sa Sidlakang Dabaw, Lalawigan sa Davao Oriental; Filipino: Lalawigan ng Silangang Davao, Lalawigan ng Davao Oriental), is a province in the Philippines located in the Davao Region in Mindanao. Its capital is the city of Mati which is the most populous, and it borders the province of Davao de Oro to the west, and Agusan del Sur and Surigao del Sur to the north. The province is the traditional homeland of the Mandaya and Kalagan/Kaagan.

Davao Oriental is the easternmost province in the country with Pusan Point in the municipality of Caraga as the easternmost location. The Philippine Sea, part of the Pacific Ocean, faces Davao Oriental to the east. Part of the province lies on an unnamed peninsula that encloses Davao Gulf to the west.

The province is the top producer of coconut and copra in the country, earning the province the title Coconut Capital of the Philippines. It is also home to Mount Hamiguitan Wildlife Sanctuary, a UNESCO World Heritage Site.

== Etymology ==
The name of the province was derived from the word, Dabaw, of which the center was west of the province.

== History ==
=== Early history ===
The present territory of Davao Oriental was covered by the historical region of Caraga, which was partly under the Sultanate of Maguindanao.

=== Spanish colonial era ===
The Spaniards established a permanent settlement in the region in 1591, and in 1844, the area was ceded by the Sultanate to Spain. An expedition was sent by the colonial government in Manila in 1847 to control the region, led by the Spaniard Jose Oyanguren, who settled in the town of Davao and organized the surrounding areas into the province of Nueva Guipozcoa in 1849. The province existed until 1858, when the politico-military commandancias of Davao and Bislig were created in its place. Bislig was incorporated into the District of Davao two years later.

=== American colonial era ===
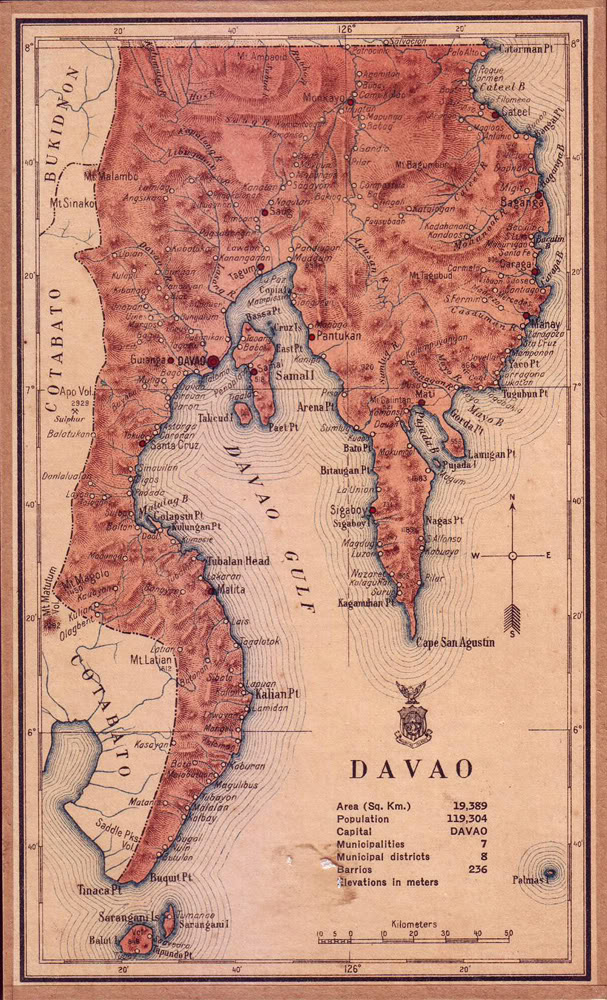
Davao province in 1918 encompassing the current provinces of Davao Region

In 1903, the colonial American government created the Moro Province comprising several districts, one of which was Davao. The Moro province was converted in 1914 into the Department of Mindanao and Sulu, and its component districts were made into independent provinces.

=== Japanese occupation ===
In 1942, the territory of what is now Davao Oriental was occupied by the Japanese Imperial forces.

In 1945, the Battle of Davao began with the combined forces of the British, Australian, Dutch and the Filipino troops of the 6th, 101st, 102nd, 103rd, 104th, 106th, 107th and 110th Infantry Division of the Philippine Commonwealth Army and 10th Infantry Regiment of the Philippine Constabulary being supported by Davaoeño guerrilla fighter units in attacking Japanese Imperial forces during the liberation in Eastern Davao or Eastern Davao Campaign until the end of the Second World War.

=== Philippine independence ===
==== Foundation ====
On May 8, 1967, through Republic Act No. 4867, the province of Davao was divided into three independent provinces, one of which was Davao Oriental. Former president Ferdinand Marcos appointed Paciano Bangoy as governor and Leopoldo Lopez as vice governor on June 2.

=== Contemporary ===
The capital town of Mati became a component city by virtue of Republic Act No. 9408 which sought to convert the municipality into a city. The law was ratified on June 16, 2007. However, the cityhood status was lost twice in the years 2008 and 2010 after the LCP questioned the validity of the cityhood law. The cityhood status was reaffirmed after the court finalized its ruling on February 15, 2011 which declared the cityhood law constitutional.

== Geography ==
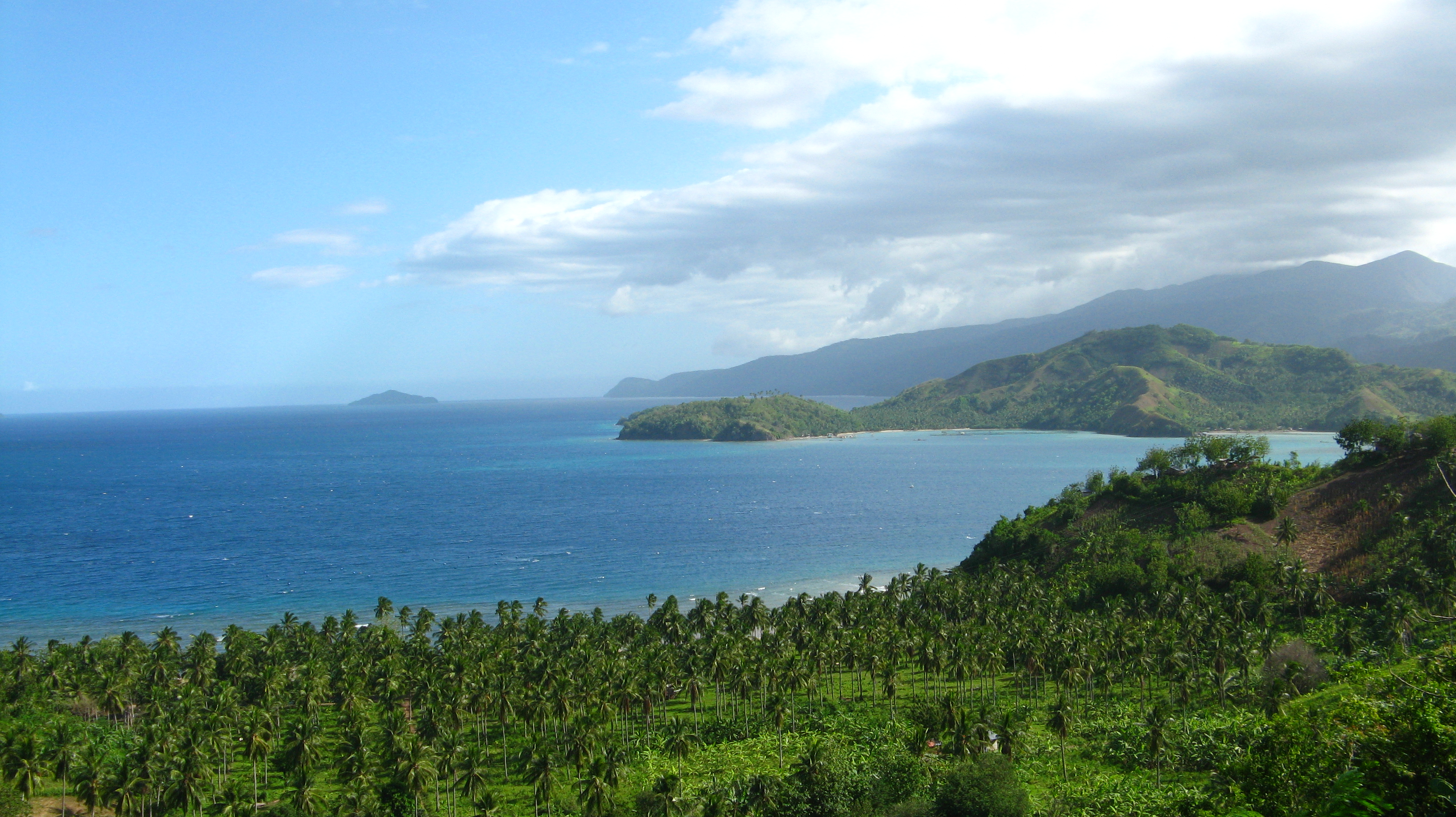
Eastern coast showing Pujada Bay

Davao Oriental covers a total area of 5,679.64 square kilometres (2,192.92 sq mi) occupying the eastern tip of the Davao Region in Mindanao. The province is bordered by Davao de Oro to the west, Agusan del Sur and Surigao del Sur to the north, Davao Gulf to the southwest, and the Philippine Sea to the east and southeast.

The Eastern Pacific Cordillera mountain range encompasses the province. To the east of the range lie narrow strips of coastal areas, which feature several inlets and bays. The province encloses Davao Gulf to the southwest.

=== Climate ===
Davao Oriental has a pronounced rainy season and a short dry season, with maximum rainfall occurring from November to January especially at coastal areas.

Climate data for Davao Oriental
Month	Jan	Feb	Mar	Apr	May	Jun	Jul	Aug	Sep	Oct	Nov	Dec	Year
Mean daily maximum °C (°F)	30.5 (86.9)	31.0 (87.8)	32.0 (89.6)	32.8 (91.0)	32.2 (90.0)	31.8 (89.2)	31.3 (88.3)	31.5 (88.7)	31.8 (89.2)	32.3 (90.1)	31.8 (89.2)	31.3 (88.3)	31.7 (89.0)
Mean daily minimum °C (°F)	23.7 (74.7)	23.9 (75.0)	24.1 (75.4)	24.7 (76.5)	24.8 (76.6)	24.6 (76.3)	24.4 (75.9)	24.5 (76.1)	24.4 (75.9)	24.4 (75.9)	24.4 (75.9)	24.2 (75.6)	24.3 (75.8)
Average rainy days	15	11	13	11	15	17	15	14	13	15	15	13	167
Source: Storm247

=== Administrative divisions ===
Davao Oriental comprises 10 municipalities and 1 city, all organized into 2 legislative districts. There are 183 barangays in the province.

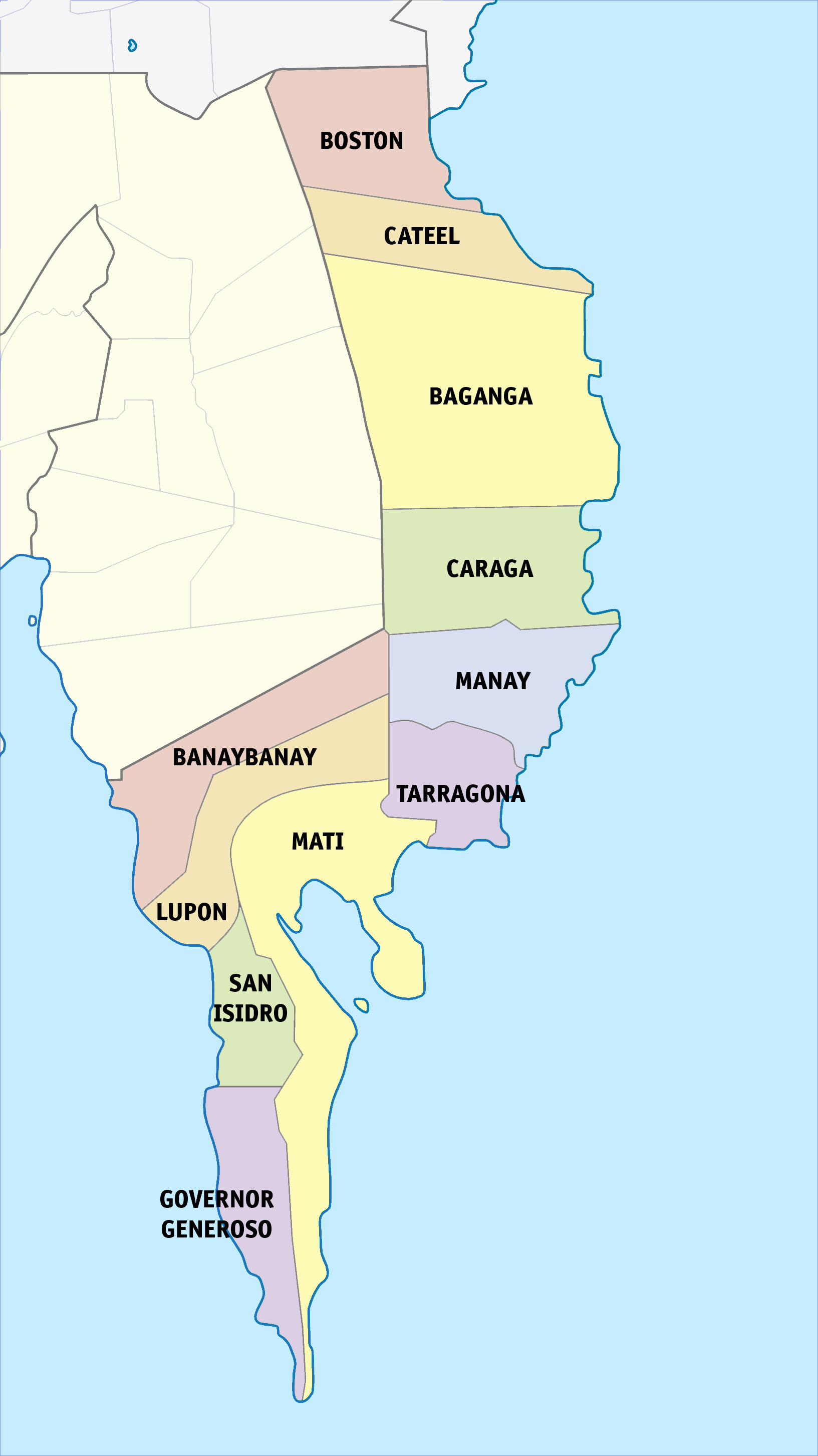
Political map of Davao Oriental

- † Provincial capital and component city
- Municipality

City or municipality		District	Population			±% p.a.	Area		Density		Barangay	Coordinates^{[A]}
			(2020)		(2015)		km^{2}	sq mi	/km^{2}	/sq mi		
Baganga		1st	10.2%	58,714	56,241	+0.82%	945.50	365.06	62	160	18	7°34′27″N 126°33′40″E
Banaybanay		2nd	7.7%	44,451	41,117	+1.50%	408.52	157.73	110	280	14	6°57′38″N 126°00′26″E
Boston		1st	2.5%	14,618	13,535	+1.48%	357.03	137.85	41	110	8	7°52′08″N 126°22′24″E
Caraga		1st	6.9%	39,704	40,379	−0.32%	642.70	248.15	62	160	17	7°19′53″N 126°33′52″E
Cateel		1st	7.7%	44,207	40,704	+1.58%	545.56	210.64	81	210	16	7°47′23″N 126°27′09″E
Governor Generoso		2nd	10.4%	59,891	55,109	+1.60%	365.75	141.22	160	410	20	6°39′30″N 126°04′47″E
Lupon		2nd	11.6%	66,979	65,785	+0.34%	886.39	342.24	76	200	21	6°54′10″N 126°00′54″E
Manay		1st	6.9%	39,572	42,690	−1.43%	418.36	161.53	95	250	17	7°12′50″N 126°32′21″E
Mati	†	2nd	25.6%	147,547	141,141	+0.85%	588.63	227.27	250	650	26	6°57′41″N 126°12′53″E
San Isidro		2nd	5.8%	33,664	36,032	−1.29%	220.44	85.11	150	390	16	6°50′07″N 126°05′22″E
Tarragona		1st	4.7%	26,996	26,225	+0.55%	300.76	116.12	90	230	10	7°02′58″N 126°26′56″E
Total				576,343	558,958	+0.58%	5,679.64	2,192.92	100	260	183	(see GeoGroup box)
1. Coordinates mark the city/town center, and are sortable by latitude.

== Demographics ==
Population census of Davao Oriental
Year	Pop.	±% p.a.
1903	25,971	—
1918	38,315	+2.63%
1939	60,744	+2.22%
1948	68,365	+1.32%
1960	132,593	+5.67%
1970	247,995	+6.45%
1975	299,426	+3.85%
1980	339,931	+2.57%
1990	394,697	+1.51%
1995	413,472	+0.87%
2000	446,191	+1.65%
2007	486,104	+1.19%
2010	517,618	+2.31%
2015	558,958	+1.47%
2020	576,343	+0.65%
2024	590,042	+0.57%
Source: Philippine Statistics Authority

The population of Davao Oriental in the 2024 census was 590,042 people, with a density of 100 inhabitants per square kilometre or 260 inhabitants per square mile.

The province is mostly inhabited by Cebuanos, who settled the province in the early 20th century from Visayas. Other ethnic groups include Bicolanos, Hiligaynons, Ilocanos, Tagalogs and Warays, as well as the indigenous Mandayas, Mansakas, Manobos and the Kalagan, who are all natives in Davao Oriental.

While the native languages spoken in the province are Kalagan, Mandaya, and Davaoeño. Cebuano is the dominant first language. Chavacano is spoken by a minority, while Tagalog and English are widely used in business, education, and government. Bikol Central is also spoken in parts of Mati.

Even some of the natives adhere to Christian faith (mostly Catholics), they are syncretic in some of their beliefs. Muslim Kagans traditionally inhabited the plains and coastal areas of the Municipalities of Banaybanay, Lupon, San Isidro, Governor Generoso, Mati and Tarragona.

== Economy ==
Poverty incidence of Davao Oriental (%)

Source: Philippine Statistics Authority

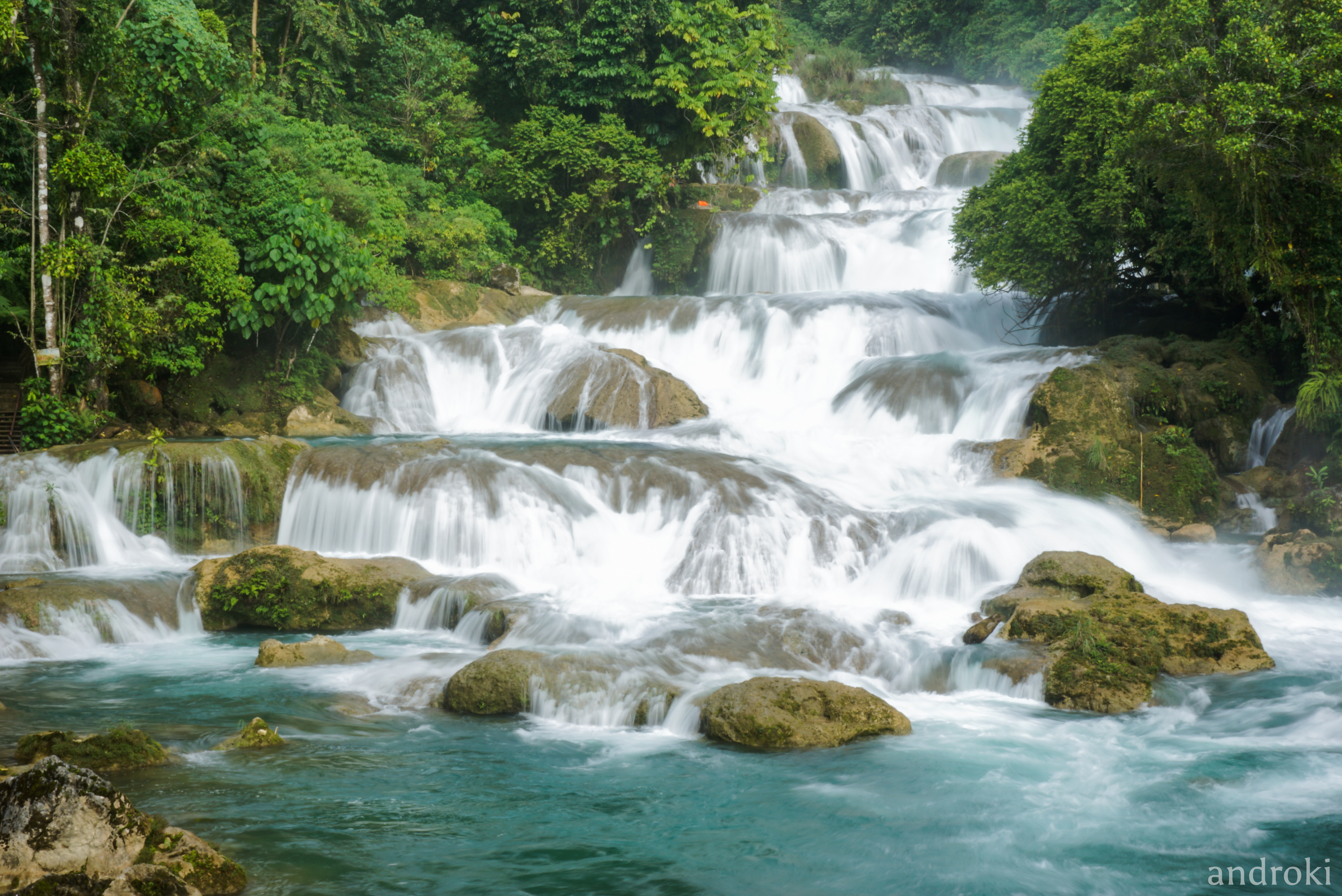
Aliwagwag Protected Landscape

Davao Oriental is the top coconut and copra (dried coconut meat) producer in the Philippines. It also is a major producer of abacá, and exports crude oil and copra pellets.

On March 20, 2018, Davao Oriental signed a memorandum of understanding (MOU) with Pionaire Finance Limited, a Hong Kong-based foreign firm for a $27-billion industrial park.

== Government ==
Current Provincial Government Officials (2025-2028)

- Governor: Nelson L. Dayanghirang (Nacionalista)
- Vice-Governor: Glenda Rabat-Gayta (Nacionalista)

Sangguniang Panlalawigan Members

1st District

- Beverly M. Dayanan (PFP)
- Manuel M. Lepardo Jr. (Nacionalista)
- Anna Cheryl N. Castro (Lakas)
- Elijah Paul E. Palma Gil (Nacionalista)
- Ma. Lady Hope J. Macayra (PFP)

2nd District

- Harold A. Montes (Lakas)
- Daud V. Linsag (Lakas)
- Stephen Paul L. Uy (PFP)
- John Erwin G. Montojo (PDP-Laban)
- Rotchie M. Ravelo (Lakas)

Ex-Officio Members

- Rustan Castillones (President, LNB)
- TBD (President, PCL)
- Ronald Lara Jr. (President, Panlalawigang Pederasyon ng Sangguniang Kabataan)
- Charlie Ambasan (Representative, IPMR)

== House of Representatives ==
District	Representative	Party	Term	Bloc
1st	Nelson R. Dayanghirang Jr.	Lakas	1	Majority
2nd	Cheeno Miguel D. Almario	NPC	2	Majority
