= Banaybanay =

Municipality in Davao Oriental, Philippines

Banaybanay Piso
- Municipality
- Municipality of Banaybanay
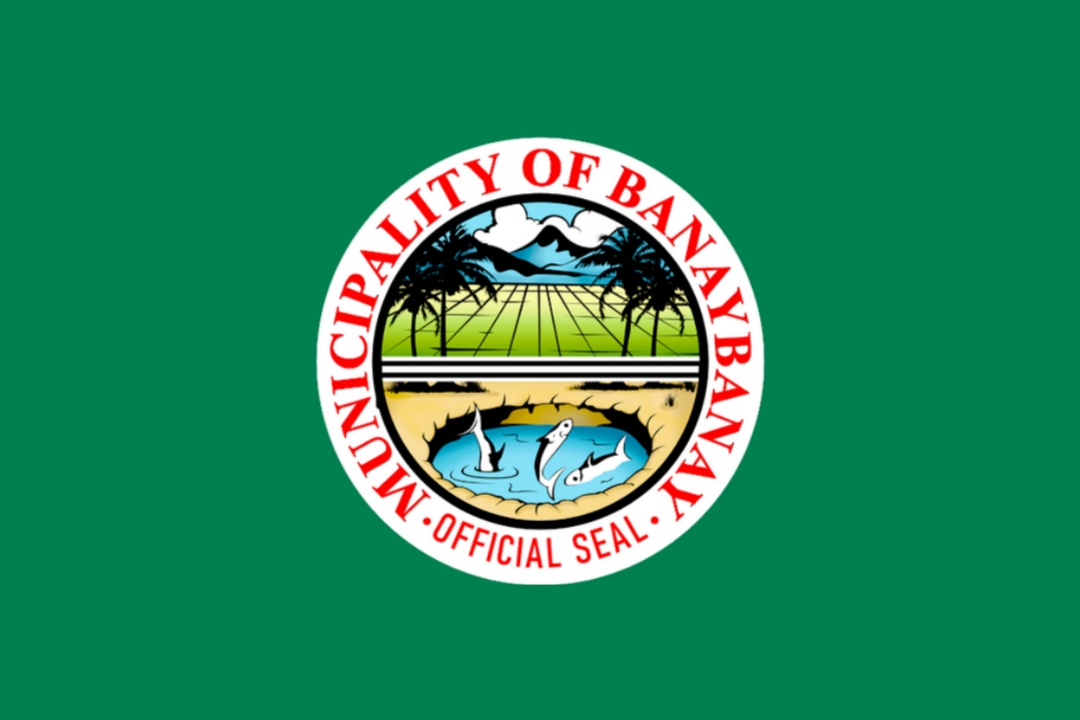
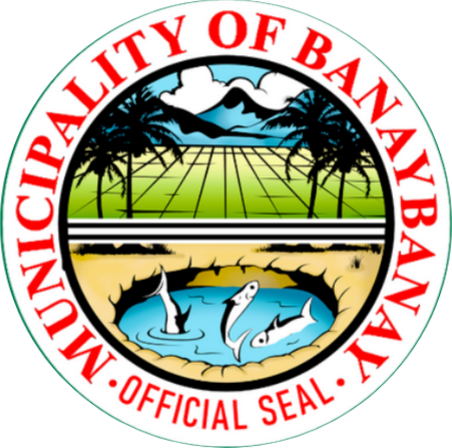
- Flag Seal
- Nickname: Gateway of Davao Oriental
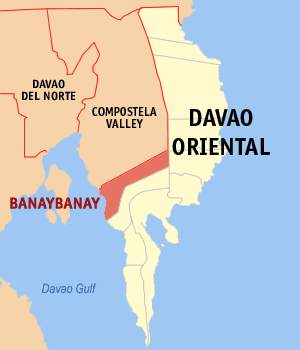
- Map of Davao Oriental with Banaybanay highlighted
- Interactive map of Banaybanay
- Location within the Philippines
- Coordinates: 6°57′59″N 126°00′41″E
- Country: Philippines
- Region: Davao Region
- Province: Davao Oriental
- District: 2nd district
- Founded: June 21, 1969
- Barangays: 14 (see Barangays)

Government
  - Type: Sangguniang Bayan
  - Mayor: Lemuel Ian M. Larcia
  - Vice Mayor: Liezel S. Teves
  - Representative: Cheeno Almario
  - Municipal Council: Members: Kenneth E. Tagaro; Racquel L. Sanlucan; Amelito T. Cordova; Renante Y. Madelo; Eva Arnie P. Impuerto; Niño G. Conson; Amir Ishmael Mamukid
  - Electorate: 33,199 voters (2025)

Area
  - Total: 408.52 km^{2} (157.73 sq mi)
- Elevation: 570 m (1,870 ft)
- Highest elevation: 2,259 m (7,411 ft)
- Lowest elevation: 0 m (0 ft)

Population (2024 census)
  - Total: 46,231
  - Density: 113.17/km^{2} (293.10/sq mi)
  - Households: 10,539

Economy
  - Income class: 1st municipal income class
  - Poverty incidence: 39.46% (2023)
  - Revenue: ₱ 280.2 million (2024)
  - Assets: ₱ 641.4 million (2024)
  - Expenditure: ₱ 261.6 million (2024)
  - Liabilities: ₱ 328.9 million (2024)

Service provider
  - Electricity: Davao Oriental Electric Cooperative (DORECO)
  - Cable TV: Trinity Cable TV Network, Inc. (Mati-based, Lupon branch)
- Time zone: UTC+8 (PST)
- ZIP code: 8208
- PSGC: 1102502000
- IDD : area code: +63 (0)87
- Native languages: Davawenyo; Surigaonon; Cebuano; Kalagan; Kamayo; Tagalog
- Website: banaybanay.gov.ph

Banaybanay ([banaɪ.banaɪ]), officially the Municipality of Banaybanay (Cebuano: Lungsod sa Banaybanay; Tagalog: Bayan ng Banaybanay), is a municipality in the province of Davao Oriental, Philippines. According to the 2024 census, it has a population of 46,231 people.

== Etymology ==
Banaybanay is derived from the two native words Banay (Kalagan word), meaning sprout due to its main livelihood in the area which is rice farming, and Bânay (Cebuano word) means clans due to the family clans that arrived in that area that came from Visayas Islands and Luzon and settled there along together with the Kalagans and Mandayan natives.

== History ==
Banaybanay was primarily inhabited by the Mandayas in the uplands of Causwagan, Panikian and Mahayag, and Kalagans in shorelines and the mouth rivers of Piso, Pongoton, Mogbongcogon, and Maputi which they have a strong settlement and a Muslim governance on that area led by datus or imams. They were influenced or under the rule of the Sultanates of Buayan and Maguindanao, which were located in western Mindanao.

Around 1800s before Uyanguren arrived in the Davao, there was a strong community of the Kalagans (Kagan) in the Piso led by a chieftain named Datu Panayangan. Their dwelling was along the river Delta of Piso, along with his people who live there peacefully, there are also Maguindanaon traders there.

The story of the arrival of the Kallaw people from Samal Island is very well known especially among the Kalagans of Banaybanay. They arrived in the Piso to settle there along with their Kalagan brothers on the permission of Datu Panayangan. The Kallaw chieftain named Datu Lamaran reconciled with Datu Panayangan to settle the swampy place of Piso which today the Barrio Pongoton from the word pangotanan means 'a place of abundance of fish and crabs to catch'.

Until now, the grandsons or the clans of Datu Panayangan and Datu Lamaran are still living on the areas that divide into many families, Some of them are still Muslims because of the deep-rooted influence of Islam among the coastal population.

== Geography ==
=== Climate ===
Climate data for Banaybanay, Davao Oriental
Month	Jan	Feb	Mar	Apr	May	Jun	Jul	Aug	Sep	Oct	Nov	Dec	Year
Mean daily maximum °C (°F)	29 (84)	29 (84)	30 (86)	30 (86)	30 (86)	29 (84)	29 (84)	29 (84)	30 (86)	30 (86)	29 (84)	30 (86)	30 (85)
Mean daily minimum °C (°F)	22 (72)	22 (72)	22 (72)	23 (73)	24 (75)	24 (75)	24 (75)	24 (75)	24 (75)	24 (75)	24 (75)	23 (73)	23 (74)
Average precipitation mm (inches)	168 (6.6)	141 (5.6)	143 (5.6)	141 (5.6)	216 (8.5)	235 (9.3)	183 (7.2)	169 (6.7)	143 (5.6)	176 (6.9)	226 (8.9)	168 (6.6)	2,109 (83.1)
Average rainy days	22.1	18.5	21.7	22.5	27.8	28.1	27.4	26.6	24.7	26.3	26.5	24.9	297.1
Source: Meteoblue

=== Barangays ===
Banaybanay is politically subdivided into 14 barangays. Each barangay consists of puroks while some have sitios.

- Cabangcalan
- Caganganan
- Calubihan
- Causwagan
- Punta Linao
- Mahayag
- Maputi
- Mogbongcogon
- Panikian
- Pintatagan
- Piso Proper
- Poblacion
- San Vicente
- Rang-ay

== Demographics ==
Population census of Banaybanay
Year	Pop.	±% p.a.
1970	14,866	—
1975	19,894	+6.02%
1980	24,644	+4.37%
1990	29,606	+1.85%
1995	33,082	+2.10%
2000	33,714	+0.41%
2007	35,693	+0.79%
2010	39,121	+3.39%
2015	41,117	+0.95%
2020	44,451	+1.65%
2024	46,231	+0.95%
Source: Philippine Statistics Authority

== Economy ==
Poverty incidence of Banaybanay (%)

Source: Philippine Statistics Authority
