= Governor Generoso =

Municipality in Davao Oriental, Philippines

Governor Generoso Sigaboy
- Municipality
- Municipality of Governor Generoso
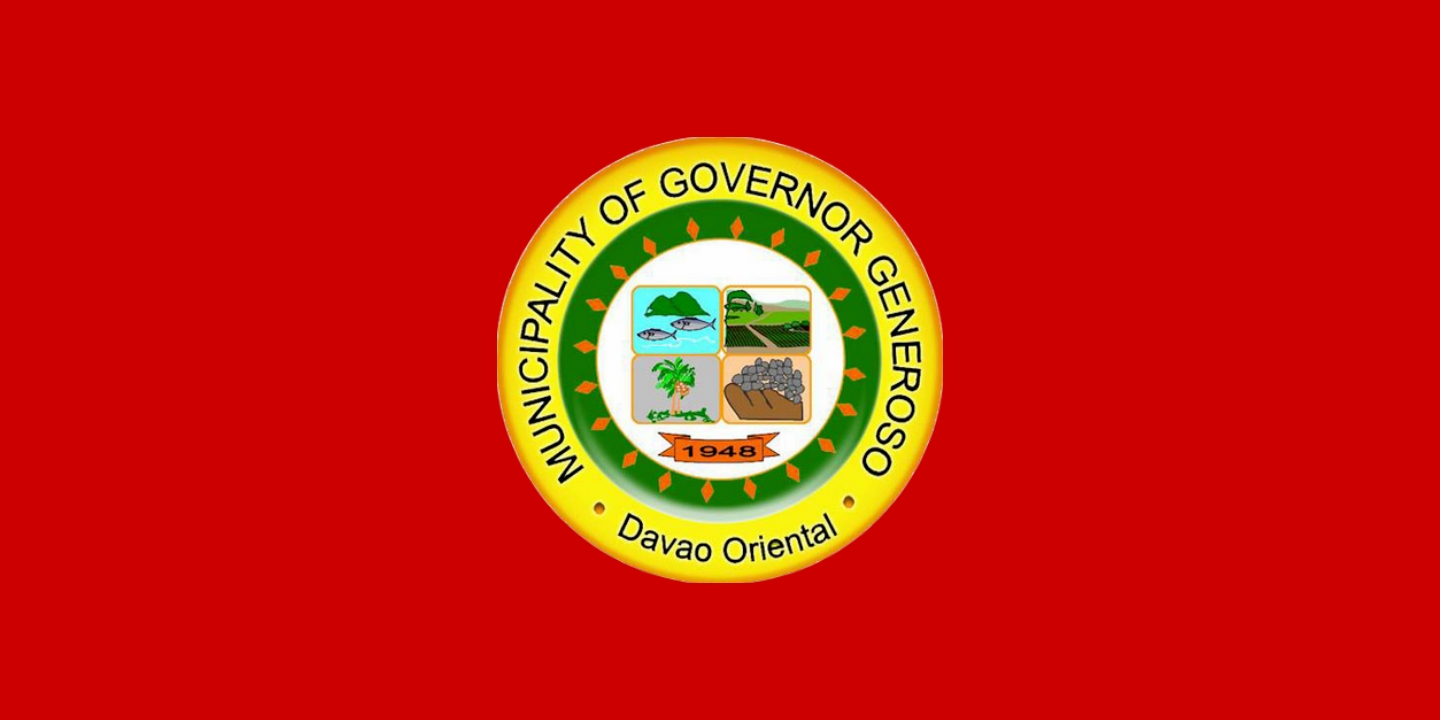
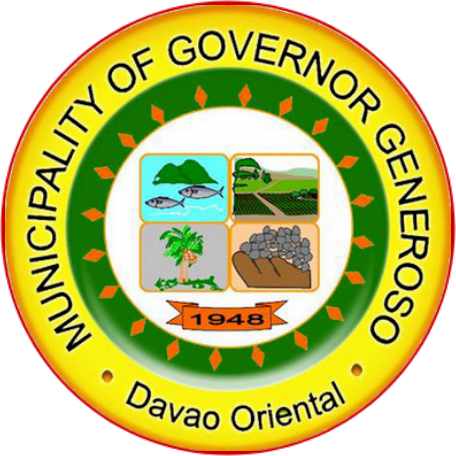
- Flag Seal

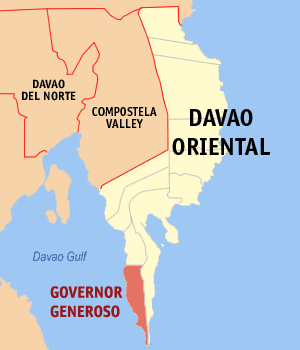
- Map of Davao Oriental with Governor Generoso highlighted
- Interactive map of Governor Generoso
- Location within the Philippines
- Coordinates: 6°39′13″N 126°04′18″E
- Country: Philippines
- Region: Davao Region
- Province: Davao Oriental
- District: 2nd district
- Founded: August 1, 1948
- Named for: Sebastian T. Generoso
- Barangays: 20 (see Barangays)

Government
  - Type: Sangguniang Bayan
  - Mayor: Juanito C. Inojales
  - Vice Mayor: XZ May P. Inojales
  - Representative: Cheeno Almario
  - Municipal Council: Members: Ana Sheira Mae L. Almacin; Juanito T. Tero Jr.; Mario Lindo J. Makiling; Jeff E. Limbadan; Gerry Bert D. Catada; Vernie B. Cielo; Alexander B. Rubio; Freddie L. Cubelo
  - Electorate: 43,170 voters (2025)

Area
  - Total: 365.75 km^{2} (141.22 sq mi)
- Elevation: 39 m (128 ft)
- Highest elevation: 1,616 m (5,302 ft)
- Lowest elevation: 0 m (0 ft)

Population (2024 census)
  - Total: 63,695
  - Density: 174.15/km^{2} (451.04/sq mi)
  - Households: 14,154

Economy
  - Income class: 1st municipal income class
  - Poverty incidence: 41.3% (2023)
  - Revenue: ₱ 334.3 million (2024)
  - Assets: ₱ 419.4 million (2024)
  - Expenditure: ₱ 295.9 million (2024)
  - Liabilities: ₱ 146.3 million (2024)

Service provider
  - Electricity: Davao Oriental Electric Cooperative (DORECO)
- Time zone: UTC+8 (PST)
- ZIP code: 8210
- PSGC: 1102506000
- IDD : area code: +63 (0)87
- Native languages: Davawenyo; Surigaonon; Cebuano; Sarangani; Sangirese; Tagalog
- Website: www.govgen.gov.ph

Governor Generoso ([hɛnɛˈɾoso]), officially the Municipality of Governor Generoso (Cebuano: Lungsod sa Gobernador Generoso; Tagalog: Bayan ng Gobernador Generoso), is a municipality in the province of Davao Oriental, Philippines. According to the 2024 census, it has a population of 63,695 people.

It was formerly known as Sigaboy.

The municipality is named after Sebastian T. Generoso, a former governor of Davao Province.

== Geography ==
=== Climate ===
Climate data for Governor Generoso, Davao Oriental
Month	Jan	Feb	Mar	Apr	May	Jun	Jul	Aug	Sep	Oct	Nov	Dec	Year
Mean daily maximum °C (°F)	28 (82)	30 (86)	30 (86)	31 (88)	30 (86)	29 (84)	29 (84)	29 (84)	30 (86)	30 (86)	29 (84)	30 (86)	30 (85)
Mean daily minimum °C (°F)	22 (72)	22 (72)	22 (72)	23 (73)	25 (77)	25 (77)	24 (75)	24 (75)	24 (75)	24 (75)	24 (75)	23 (73)	24 (74)
Average precipitation mm (inches)	168 (6.6)	141 (5.6)	143 (5.6)	141 (5.6)	216 (8.5)	235 (9.3)	183 (7.2)	169 (6.7)	143 (5.6)	176 (6.9)	226 (8.9)	168 (6.6)	2,109 (83.1)
Average rainy days	22.1	18.5	21.7	22.5	27.8	28.1	27.4	26.6	24.7	26.3	26.5	24.9	297.1
Source: Meteoblue

=== Barangays ===
Generoso is politically subdivided into 20 barangays. Each barangay consists of puroks while some have sitios.

- Anitap
- Crispin Dela Cruz
- Don Aurelio Chicote
- Lavigan (southernmost barangay in the province)
- Luzon
- Magdug
- Manuel Roxas
- Montserrat
- Nangan
- Oregon
- Poblacion (Sigaboy)
- Pundaguitan
- Sergio Osmeña
- Surop
- Tagabebe
- Tamban
- Tandang Sora
- Tibanban
- Tiblawan
- Upper Tibanban

== Demographics ==
Population census of Governor Generoso
Year	Pop.	±% p.a.
1918	6,625	—
1939	5,254	−1.10%
1948	6,449	+2.30%
1960	21,651	+10.62%
1970	28,329	+2.72%
1975	32,795	+2.98%
1980	34,803	+1.20%
1990	39,857	+1.37%
1995	41,433	+0.73%
2000	42,705	+0.65%
2007	46,745	+1.25%
2010	50,372	+2.76%
2015	55,109	+1.73%
2020	59,891	+1.77%
2024	63,695	+1.49%
Source: Philippine Statistics Authority

== Economy ==
Poverty incidence of Governor Generoso (%)

Source: Philippine Statistics Authority
