= Lupon =

Municipality in Davao Oriental, Philippines

- Municipality
- Municipality of Lupon
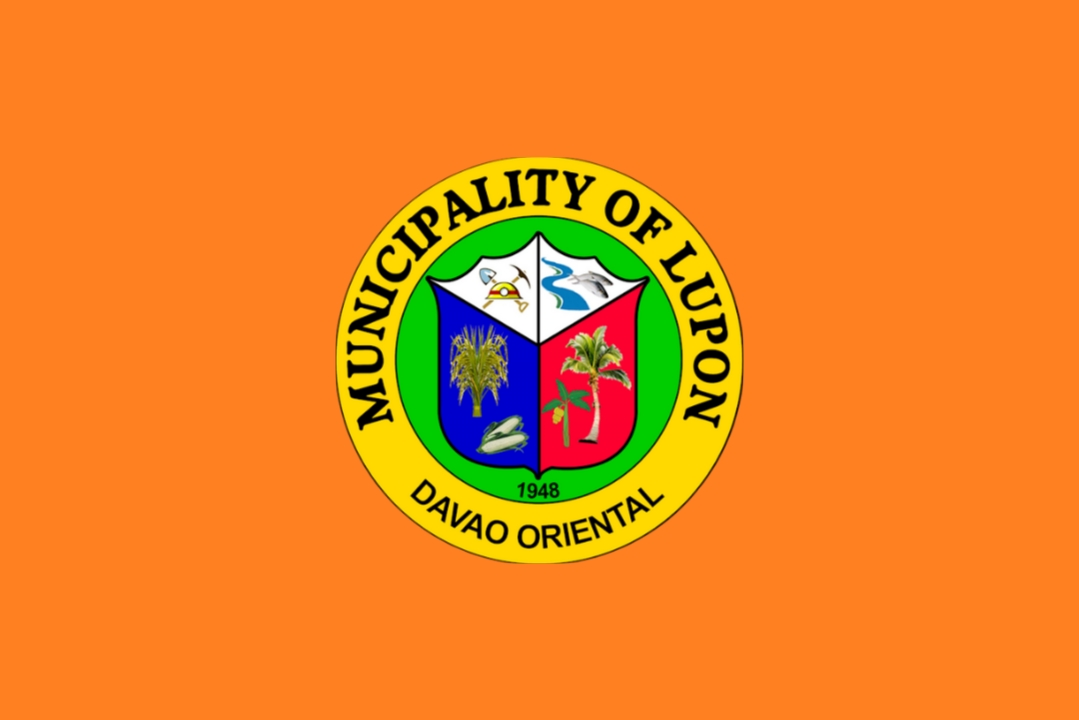
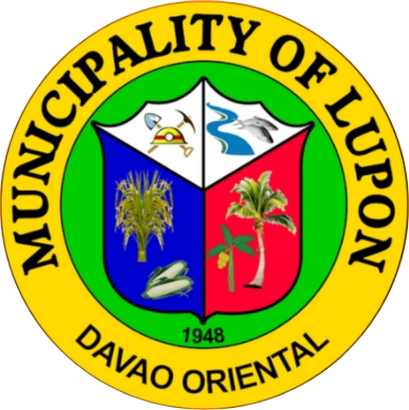
- Flag Seal

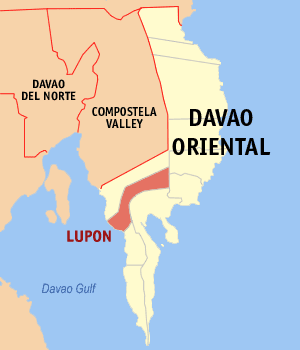
- Map of Davao Oriental with Lupon highlighted
- Interactive map of Lupon
- Location within the Philippines
- Coordinates: 6°53′49″N 126°00′42″E
- Country: Philippines
- Region: Davao Region
- Province: Davao Oriental
- District: 2nd district
- Founded: August 8, 1948
- Barangays: 21 (see Barangays)

Government
  - Type: Sangguniang Bayan
  - Mayor: Santos Q. Alonzo Jr.
  - Vice Mayor: Christian Lawrence C. Go
  - Representative: Cheeno Almario
  - Municipal Council: Members: Edna B. Bote; Harold A. Montes; Gina Y. Libre; Bonso S. Barabag; Juan A. Maralit Jr.; Cenen A. Angsinco; Sani C. Hanani; Reynaldo P. Suriba
  - Electorate: 50,924 voters (2025)

Area
  - Total: 886.39 km^{2} (342.24 sq mi)
- Elevation: 299 m (981 ft)
- Highest elevation: 2,320 m (7,610 ft)
- Lowest elevation: 0 m (0 ft)

Population (2024 census)
  - Total: 68,717
  - Density: 77.525/km^{2} (200.79/sq mi)
  - Households: 16,676

Economy
  - Income class: 1st municipal income class
  - Poverty incidence: 30.31% (2023)
  - Revenue: ₱ 496.9 million (2024)
  - Assets: ₱ 1,422 million (2024)
  - Expenditure: ₱ 446.6 million (2024)
  - Liabilities: ₱ 275.2 million (2024)

Service provider
  - Electricity: Davao Oriental Electric Cooperative (DORECO)
  - Water: Lupon Water District
  - Telecommunications: Dito Telecommunity; Globe Telecom; PLDT
  - Cable TV: Trinity Cable TV Network, Inc. (Mati-based, Lupon branch)
- Time zone: UTC+8 (PST)
- ZIP code: 8207
- PSGC: 1102507000
- IDD : area code: +63 (0)87
- Native languages: Davawenyo; Surigaonon; Cebuano; Kalagan; Kamayo; Tagalog
- Website: lupon.gov.ph

Lupon ([lʊˈpɔn]), officially the Municipality of Lupon (Cebuano: Lungsod sa Lupon; Tagalog: Bayan ng Lupon), is a municipality in the province of Davao Oriental, Philippines. According to the 2024 census, it has a population of 68,717 people.

Lupon is said to have derived its name from the native word "naluponan", meaning a body of land accumulated at the mouth of a river resulting from years of continued accretion. The settlers shortened the word to "Lupon". This "naluponan" area was then applied to the mouth of the Sumlug river of Lupon municipality of today.

== Geography ==
=== Climate ===
Climate data for Lupon, Davao Oriental
Month	Jan	Feb	Mar	Apr	May	Jun	Jul	Aug	Sep	Oct	Nov	Dec	Year
Mean daily maximum °C (°F)	29 (84)	29 (84)	30 (86)	30 (86)	30 (86)	29 (84)	29 (84)	29 (84)	30 (86)	30 (86)	29 (84)	30 (86)	30 (85)
Mean daily minimum °C (°F)	22 (72)	22 (72)	22 (72)	23 (73)	24 (75)	24 (75)	24 (75)	24 (75)	24 (75)	24 (75)	24 (75)	23 (73)	23 (74)
Average precipitation mm (inches)	168 (6.6)	141 (5.6)	143 (5.6)	141 (5.6)	216 (8.5)	235 (9.3)	183 (7.2)	169 (6.7)	143 (5.6)	176 (6.9)	226 (8.9)	168 (6.6)	2,109 (83.1)
Average rainy days	22.1	18.5	21.7	22.5	27.8	28.1	27.4	26.6	24.7	26.3	26.5	24.9	297.1
Source: Meteoblue

=== Barangays ===
Lupon is politically subdivided into 21 barangays. Each barangay consists of puroks while some have sitios.

- Bagumbayan
- Cabadiangan
- Calapagan
- Cocornon
- Corporacion
- Don Mariano Marcos
- Ilangay
- Langka
- Lantawan
- Limbahan
- Macangao
- Magsaysay
- Mahayahay
- Maragatas
- Marayag
- New Visayas
- Poblacion
- San Isidro
- San Jose
- Tagboa
- Tagugpo

== Demographics ==
Population census of Lupon
Year	Pop.	±% p.a.
1939	4,905	—
1948	7,746	+5.21%
1960	26,149	+10.67%
1970	32,456	+2.18%
1975	35,497	+1.81%
1980	41,081	+2.96%
1990	47,946	+1.56%
1995	50,668	+1.04%
2000	57,092	+2.59%
2007	60,133	+0.72%
2010	61,723	+0.95%
2015	65,785	+1.22%
2020	66,979	+0.38%
2024	68,717	+0.62%
Source: Philippine Statistics Authority

Lupon, like many areas of Mindanao, is inhabited by the Mandaya, Mansaka, the native Kalagans, and the local immigrants from all points of the Visayas, Luzon and Mindanao. The immigrants brought with them their culture resulting in a mixture of beliefs and practices.

== Economy ==
Poverty incidence of Lupon (%)

Source: Philippine Statistics Authority

== History ==
Lupon was primarily inhabited by the Mandaya and Mansaka in the hinterlands, and the native Kalagans in the shorelines of Lupon connected to Pantukan municipality and San Isidro municipality today. But, through a wave of migration [local immigrants from Luzon and the Visayas (Christians and Muslims alike)] and the coming of logging concessions, the population of Lupon has increased through the succeeding years.

The migrants from Luzon and Visayas took advantage of the natives' kindness and ignorance. They took their lands and were even proud to tell stories that the natives (Mandayas) changed their lands for sardines and tobacco.

The land grabbers and their descendants insult Mandayas on a daily basis. They treat them like they are lower life forms. They yell at them "Mandaya! Mandaya!" like being a Mandaya is a shameful thing. When a person behaves stupidly they will say "You are like a Mandaya." All of them does it including the educated ones.

=== Creation into a Municipal District ===
Lupon first became a regular barrio of Pantukan in 1919. Two years later Governor General Francis Burton Harrison issued an Executive Order No. 8, series of 1921, creating Lupon as a Municipal District comprising eight (8) barrios that include Poblacion Lupon, Sumlog, Cocornon, Tagugpo, Piso, Maputi, Langka, and Banaybanay.

For the meantime, Datu Commara Manuel was appointed as the municipal district president from 1921 to 1929. The American Occupation in the Philippine Islands was serious about pacifying inhabitants from rebellion against the American regime. What they did was to create Mindanao into a Moro Province, at the expense of the Christians both Catholic and Protestants also inhabiting the whole region. It was on this ground that Lupon was said to have been made into a sultanate with Datu Manuel as its sultan. But such an idea of Lupon becoming a sultanate was short-lived as Datu Manuel was replaced by the succeeding municipal district presidents.

These were the municipal district presidents after Datu Manuel: Alfredo Lindo (1929–1931); Luis Yabut (1931–1933); Teodoro Panuncialman (1933–1939); Carlos Badolato (1939 to the outbreak of World War II); Sixto Carreon (1940 onward to the Japanese Occupation); Cresencio Tuballa (1944–1945 time of the Philippine Commonwealth military and Recognized Guerrillas); Claudio Libre (1945–1946); Cresencio Tuballa (1946); and Carlos Badolato (1946–1947).

=== Creation into a regular municipality ===
Lupon was created into a regular municipality on August 8, 1948, by virtue of Executive Order No. 151, s. 1948 with Teodoro Panuncialman as the first appointed mayor of Lupon. But that appointment was cut short by another appointment of Crisanto Magno as mayor of Lupon from 1948 to 1950; however Panuncialman was re-appointed for 1950–1951.

At this time in 1951, a local election installed Crisanto Magno as the first elected mayor of Lupon from 1951 to 1955. Then the succeeding elected mayors were privileged to take responsibility of the unbroken mayoralty seat of Lupon. Oswaldo Barol (1955–67); Eulalio Angala Jr. (1967–79); Francisco M. dela Cruz (1979–86); then at the transition from the Marcos to the Aquino administration brought about by the February 1986 Edsa Revolution, Jose Lim was appointed Office In-Charge (1986–87); then Francisco dela Cruz was again re-elected and the longest reigning mayor(1988–98); Quiñones was elected in May (1998–2001); and Guiñez was elected in May 2001. But his untimely death brought the Vice Mayor Barabag to the mayoralty seat in 2002 to finish the term up until 2004. Quiñones was again elected to office during the 2004 elections and would serve the office until 2007. In 2007 Domingo Lim was first elected and served as mayor until 2016 after winning the 2010 and 2013 mayoralty elections respectively. He was replaced by this wife Erlinda Lim who won the 2016 election and became the first ever woman to serve as mayor of Lupon.

=== Mayors of Lupon ===
Here is the list of the Mayors of Lupon:

- Sultan Comarra T. Manuel, Municipal District President (1921–1929)
- Alfredo P. Lindo, Municipal District President (1929–1931)
- Luis Yabut, Municipal District President (1931–1932)
- Teodoro M. Panuncialman (1932–1933)
  - Appointed Mayor (1946–1947)
- Carlos Badolato, Municipal District President (1933–1939)
  - Appointed Mayor (1946–1947)
- Sixto Carreon, Municipal District President, Japanese Occupation (Wartime)
- Cresencio Tuballa, Municipal District President (1942–1944) Guerilla Mayor
  - Appointed Mayor, (1946)
- Emiliano Montos, Municipal District President (1944–1945)
- Crisanto M. Magno, Appointed Mayor (1948–1950)
  - Elected Mayor (1951–1955)
- Oswaldo P. Barol, Elected Mayor (1955–1967)
- Romeo M. Bote Sr., OIC Mayor (1967)
- Capistrano V. Roflo Sr., OIC Mayor (1967)
- Eulalio A. Angala Jr., Elected Mayor (1967)
- Francisco M. Dela Cruz, Elected Mayor (1981-1985 & 1988-1998)
- Jose A. Lim, OIC Mayor (1986–1987)
- Faustino T. Suzon Sr., OIC Mayor (1987)
- Arfran L. Quinones, Elected Mayor (1998–2001 & 2004-2007)
- Manuel B. Guinez, Elected Mayor (2001)
- Hadji Bonso S. Barabag, Mayor By Succession (2001–2003)
- Domingo A. Lim, Elected Mayor (2007–2016)
- Erlinda Lim, Elected Mayor (2016-present)

== See also ==
- Eastern Davao Academy Inc.
- Lupon National Comprehensive High School
- Lupon Vocational High school
- Bagumbayan Agro Industrial High School
