= Cateel =

Municipality in Davao Oriental, Philippines

- Municipality
- Municipality of Cateel
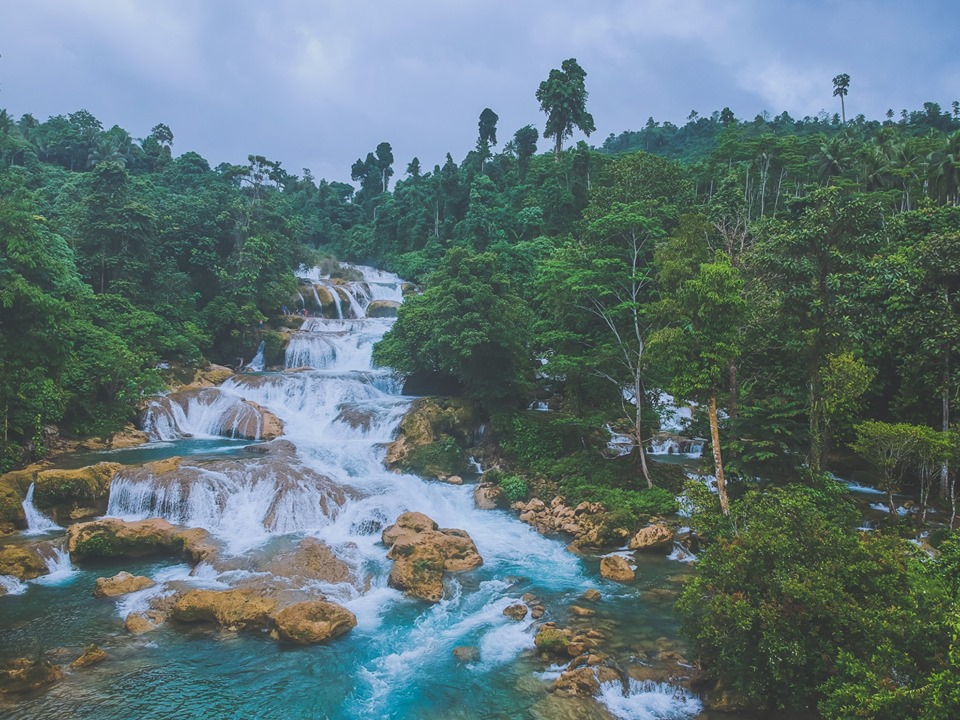
- Aliwagwag Falls

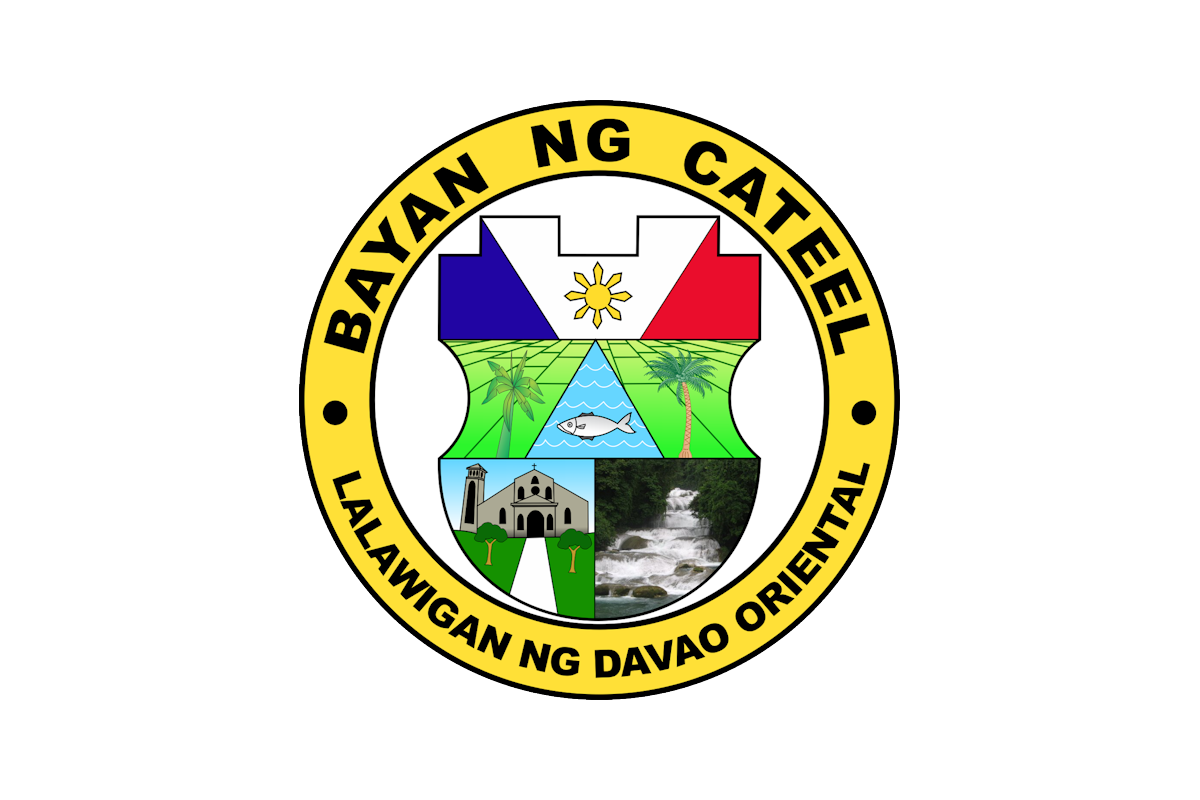
- Flag Seal

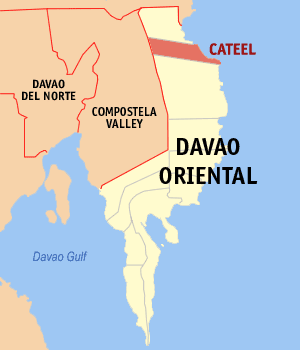
- Map of Davao Oriental with Cateel highlighted
- Interactive map of Cateel
- Location within the Philippines
- Coordinates: 7°47′24″N 126°27′11″E
- Country: Philippines
- Region: Davao Region
- Province: Davao Oriental
- District: 1st district
- Established: October 29, 1903
- Barangays: 16 (see Barangays)

Government
  - Type: Sangguniang Bayan
  - Mayor: Erlinda C. Nuñez
  - Vice Mayor: Camilo T. Nuñez
  - Representative: Corazon N. Malanyaon
  - Municipal Council: Members: Patrocenio I. Veroy; Anna Cheryl N. Castro; Alderito A. Silverio; Michael D. Rosalia; Isidro S. Castro; Wilbur Y. Chua; Brillo P. Quibo; Nemesio C. Magno III
  - Electorate: 33,776 voters (2025)

Area
  - Total: 545.56 km^{2} (210.64 sq mi)
- Elevation: 233 m (764 ft)
- Highest elevation: 2,484 m (8,150 ft)
- Lowest elevation: 0 m (0 ft)

Population (2024 census)
  - Total: 45,623
  - Density: 83.626/km^{2} (216.59/sq mi)
  - Households: 10,902

Economy
  - Income class: 1st municipal income class
  - Poverty incidence: 42.78% (2023)
  - Revenue: ₱ 283.6 million (2024)
  - Assets: ₱ 378.5 million (2024)
  - Expenditure: ₱ 305.2 million (2024)
  - Liabilities: ₱ 104.1 million (2024)

Service provider
  - Electricity: Davao Oriental Electric Cooperative (DORECO)
- Time zone: UTC+8 (PST)
- ZIP code: 8205
- PSGC: 1102505000
- IDD : area code: +63 (0)87
- Native languages: Davawenyo; Surigaonon; Cebuano; Kalagan; Kamayo; Mandaya
- Website: www.cateel.gov.ph

Cateel ([kɐtiʔil]), officially the Municipality of Cateel (Cebuano: Lungsod sa Cateel; Tagalog: Bayan ng Cateel), is a municipality in the province of Davao Oriental, Philippines. According to the 2024 census, it has a population of 45,623 people.

Cateel is home of the Aliwagwag Falls, located in Barangay Aliwagwag within the Aliwagwag Protected Landscape. It is a multi-tiered cascade regarded by hydraulic engineers as the highest waterfall in the country and is considered one of the most beautiful in the Philippines.

The falls consist of 84 cascading tiers resembling a stairway, with individual drops ranging from 2 to 33.5 meters (7 to 110 ft). Some of the notable tiers measure approximately 22 meters (72 ft) and 20 meters (66 ft). Overall, Aliwagwag Falls has a total height of about 340 meters (1,120 ft) and a width of around 20 meters (66 ft).

The waterfall is set within a largely undisturbed forest, and a river flows at its base, featuring 13 rapids.

== History ==
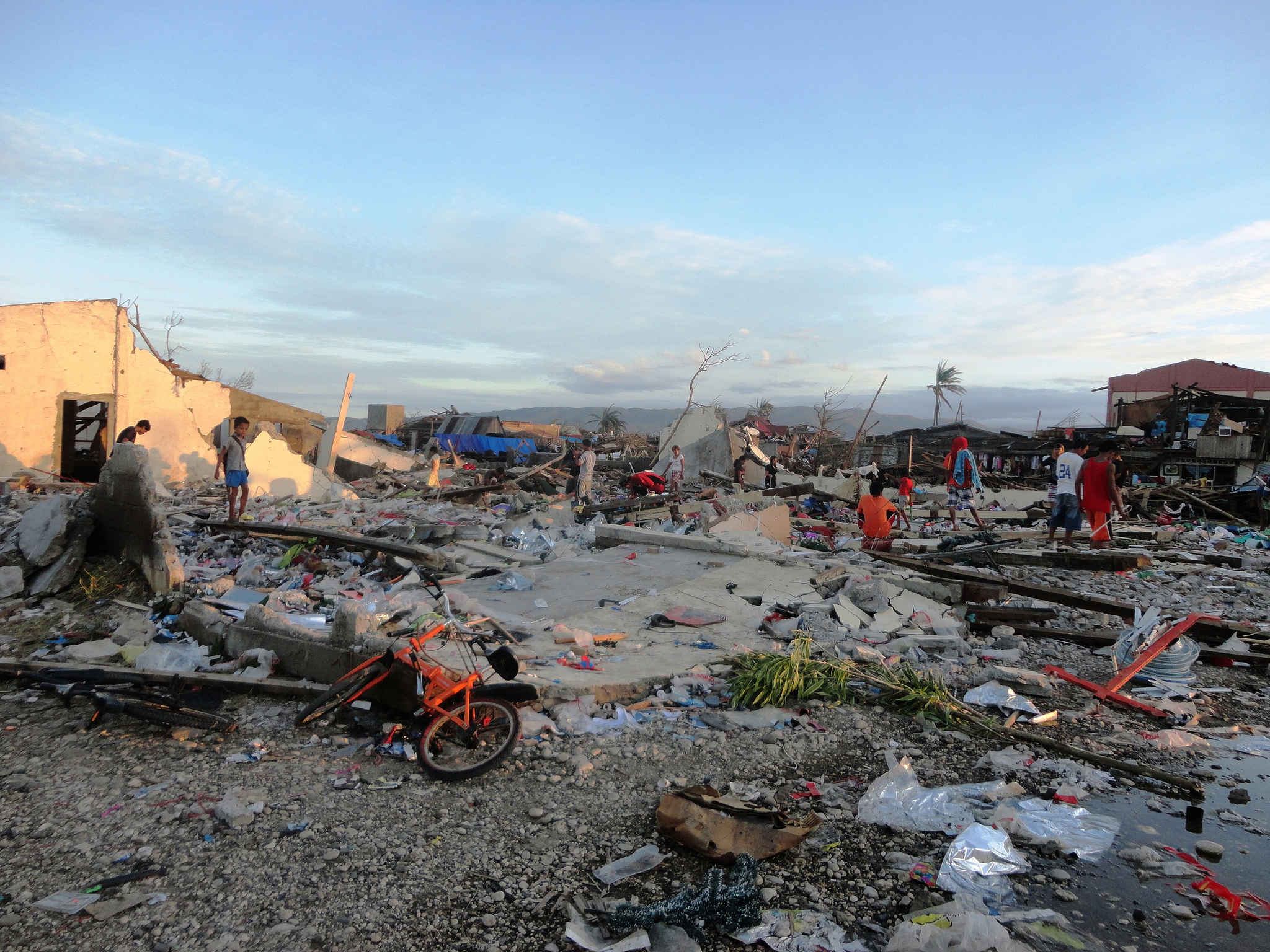
Aftermath of Typhoon Bopha in Cateel, December 2012

Cateel is considered the first municipality established in Mindanao. It is also believed to be among the earliest landing sites of Spanish colonizers in the region, which is reflected in the predominantly Catholic composition of its population.

In 1959, Mainit and Alegria were converted into barrios.

The municipality was one of the hardest-hit towns by Typhoon Bopha when it crossed the town on December 3, 2012.

== Geography ==
=== Climate ===
Cateel has a tropical rainforest climate (Af) with heavy to very heavy rainfall year-round with extremely heavy rainfall in December and January.

Climate data for Caraga
| Month | Jan | Feb | Mar | Apr | May | Jun | Jul | Aug | Sep | Oct | Nov | Dec | Year |
|---|---|---|---|---|---|---|---|---|---|---|---|---|---|
| Mean daily maximum °C (°F) | 29.7 (85.5) | 29.9 (85.8) | 30.7 (87.3) | 31.6 (88.9) | 31.8 (89.2) | 31.6 (88.9) | 31.5 (88.7) | 31.8 (89.2) | 32.0 (89.6) | 31.7 (89.1) | 31.3 (88.3) | 30.4 (86.7) | 31.2 (88.1) |
| Daily mean °C (°F) | 25.7 (78.3) | 25.9 (78.6) | 26.3 (79.3) | 27.1 (80.8) | 27.4 (81.3) | 27.2 (81.0) | 27.0 (80.6) | 27.2 (81.0) | 27.3 (81.1) | 27.1 (80.8) | 26.9 (80.4) | 26.3 (79.3) | 26.8 (80.2) |
| Mean daily minimum °C (°F) | 21.8 (71.2) | 21.9 (71.4) | 22.0 (71.6) | 22.6 (72.7) | 23.0 (73.4) | 22.8 (73.0) | 22.5 (72.5) | 22.6 (72.7) | 22.6 (72.7) | 22.6 (72.7) | 22.5 (72.5) | 22.2 (72.0) | 22.4 (72.4) |
| Average rainfall mm (inches) | 794 (31.3) | 581 (22.9) | 532 (20.9) | 344 (13.5) | 233 (9.2) | 113 (4.4) | 110 (4.3) | 92 (3.6) | 92 (3.6) | 182 (7.2) | 300 (11.8) | 675 (26.6) | 4,048 (159.3) |
Source: Climate-Data.org

=== Barangays ===
Cateel is politically subdivided into 16 barangays. Each barangay consists of puroks while some have sitios.

- Abihod
- Alegria
- Aliwagwag
- Aragon
- Baybay
- Maglahus
- Mainit
- Malibago
- San Alfonso
- San Antonio
- San Miguel
- San Rafael
- San Vicente
- Santa Filomena
- Taytayan
- Poblacion

== Demographics ==
Population census of Cateel
| Year | Pop. | ±% p.a. |
|---|---|---|
| 1903 | 4,101 | — |
| 1918 | 5,906 | +2.46% |
| 1939 | 9,243 | +2.16% |
| 1948 | 10,671 | +1.61% |
| 1960 | 14,586 | +2.64% |
| 1970 | 14,633 | +0.03% |
| 1975 | 15,849 | +1.61% |
| 1980 | 20,084 | +4.85% |
| 1990 | 26,144 | +2.67% |
| 1995 | 27,211 | +0.75% |
| 2000 | 28,655 | +1.11% |
| 2007 | 33,109 | +2.01% |
| 2010 | 38,579 | +5.72% |
| 2015 | 40,704 | +1.03% |
| 2020 | 44,207 | +1.75% |
| 2024 | 45,623 | +0.76% |
Source: Philippine Statistics Authority

== Economy ==
Poverty incidence of Cateel (%)

Source: Philippine Statistics Authority
