= Lumad =

Group of Austronesian indigenous people

Lumad peoples
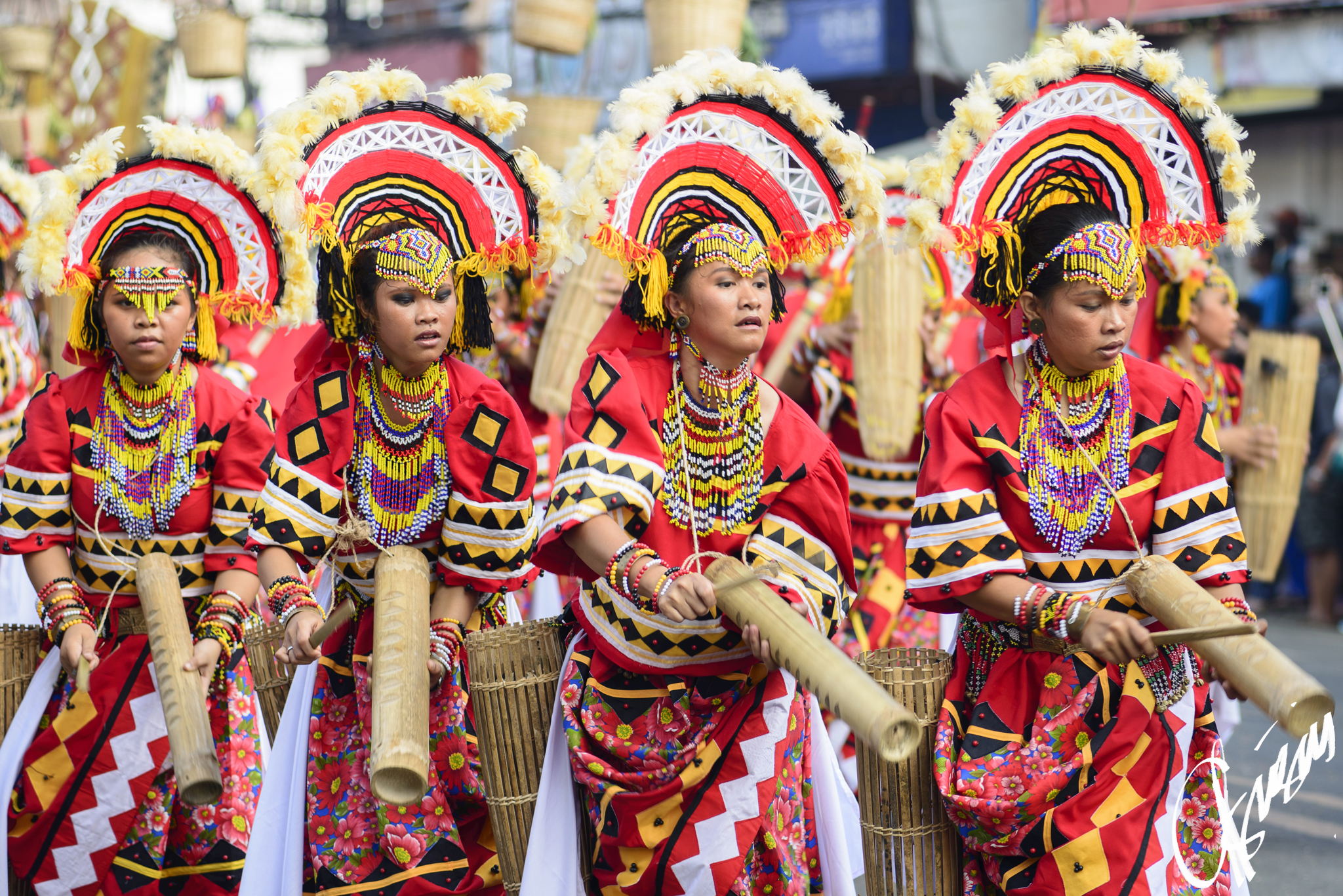
- Women in traditional Manobo attire during the Kaamulan Festival of Bukidnon.

Regions with significant populations
- Philippines; Caraga; Davao Region; Northern Mindanao; Soccsksargen; Zamboanga Peninsula

Languages
- Native; Manobo languages, Mansakan languages, Subanen languages, South Mindanao languages Also; Cebuano, Hiligaynon, Chavacano, Filipino, English

Religion
- Christianity (Roman Catholicism, Protestantism), Animism, and Islam

Related ethnic groups
- Moro, and other Austronesian peoples

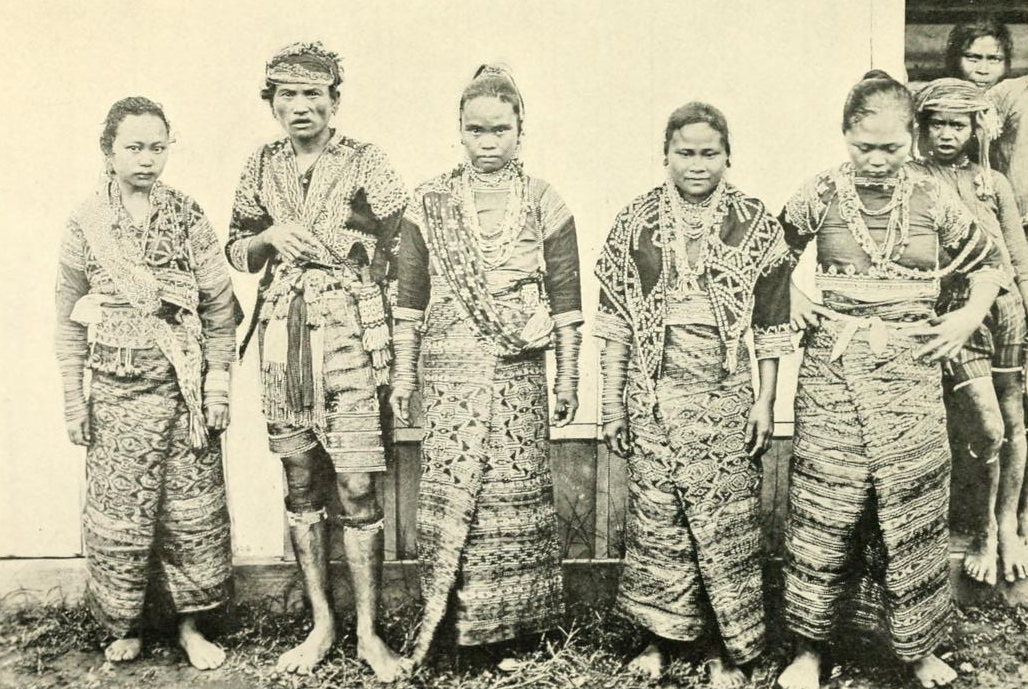
The Bagobo people in their traditional attire (c. 1913)

The Lumad are a group of Austronesian indigenous peoples in the southern Philippines. It is a Cebuano term meaning 'native' or 'indigenous'. The term is short for Katawhang Lumad (lit. 'indigenous people'), the autonym officially adopted by the delegates of the Lumad Mindanao Peoples Federation (LMPF) founding assembly on 26 June 1986 at the Guadalupe Formation Center, Balindog, Kidapawan, Cotabato. Usage of the term was accepted in Philippine jurisprudence when President Corazon Aquino signed into law Republic Act 6734, where the word was used in Art. XIII sec. 8(2) to distinguish Lumad ethnic communities from the islands of Mindanao.

Mindanao is home to a substantial part of the country's indigenous population, comprising around 15% of the Philippine population.

== History ==
The name Lumad grew out of the political awakening among tribes during the martial law regime of President Ferdinand Marcos. It was advocated and propagated by the members and affiliates of Lumad-Mindanao, a coalition of all-Lumad local and regional organizations that formalized themselves as such in June 1986 but started in 1983 as a multi-sectoral organization. Lumad-Mindanao's main objective was to achieve self-determination for their member-tribes or, put more concretely, self-governance within their ancestral domain in accordance with their culture and customary laws. No other Lumad organization had the express goal in the past.

Representatives from 15 tribes agreed in June 1986 to adopt the name; there were no delegates from the two major groups of the T'boli and the Teduray. The choice of a Cebuano word was a bit ironic but they deemed it appropriate as the Lumad tribes do not have any other common language except Cebuano. This marked the first time that these tribes had agreed to a common name for themselves, distinct from that of other Mindanao native groups: the Muslim Moro peoples of southwestern Mindanao; and the sea-faring Visayans of coastal areas in northern and eastern Mindanao (Butuanon, Surigaonon, and Kagay-anon, collectively known as the "Dumagat" or "Sea People" by the Lumad). All of which, in turn are distinct from the (mostly Visayan) migrant majority of modern Mindanao.

On 2 March 2021, the National Commission on Indigenous Peoples issued a resolution denouncing the use of the term lumad when referring to Indigenous Cultural Communities (ICC) and Indigenous Peoples (IPs). The resolution stated that elders, leaders, and members of different ICCs and IPs in Mindanao requested that they not be called "Lumad", and instead want to be referred to by their respective ethnolinguistic group names. However, anthropologists and historians pointed out errors in the commission's resolution, particularly with regard to the origin and usage of the term Lumad. Scholars and Lumad leaders stated that the resolution stems from a lack of historical awareness and the commission's ignorance of Lumad struggles in Mindanao.

== Ethnic groups ==
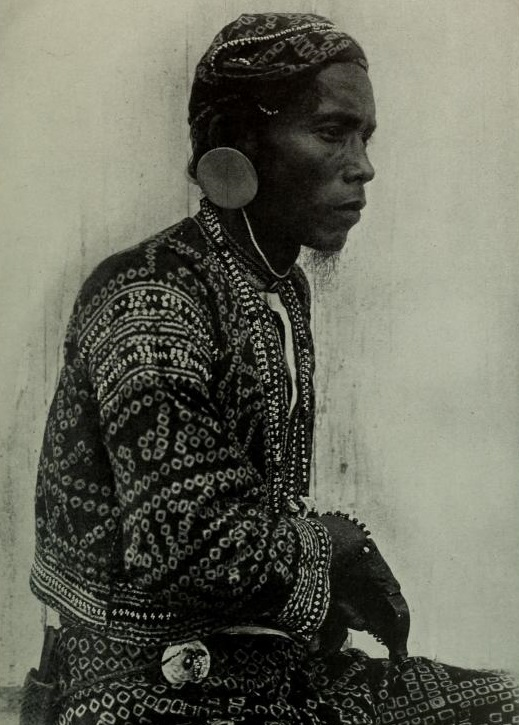
A Bagobo chief (matanum)

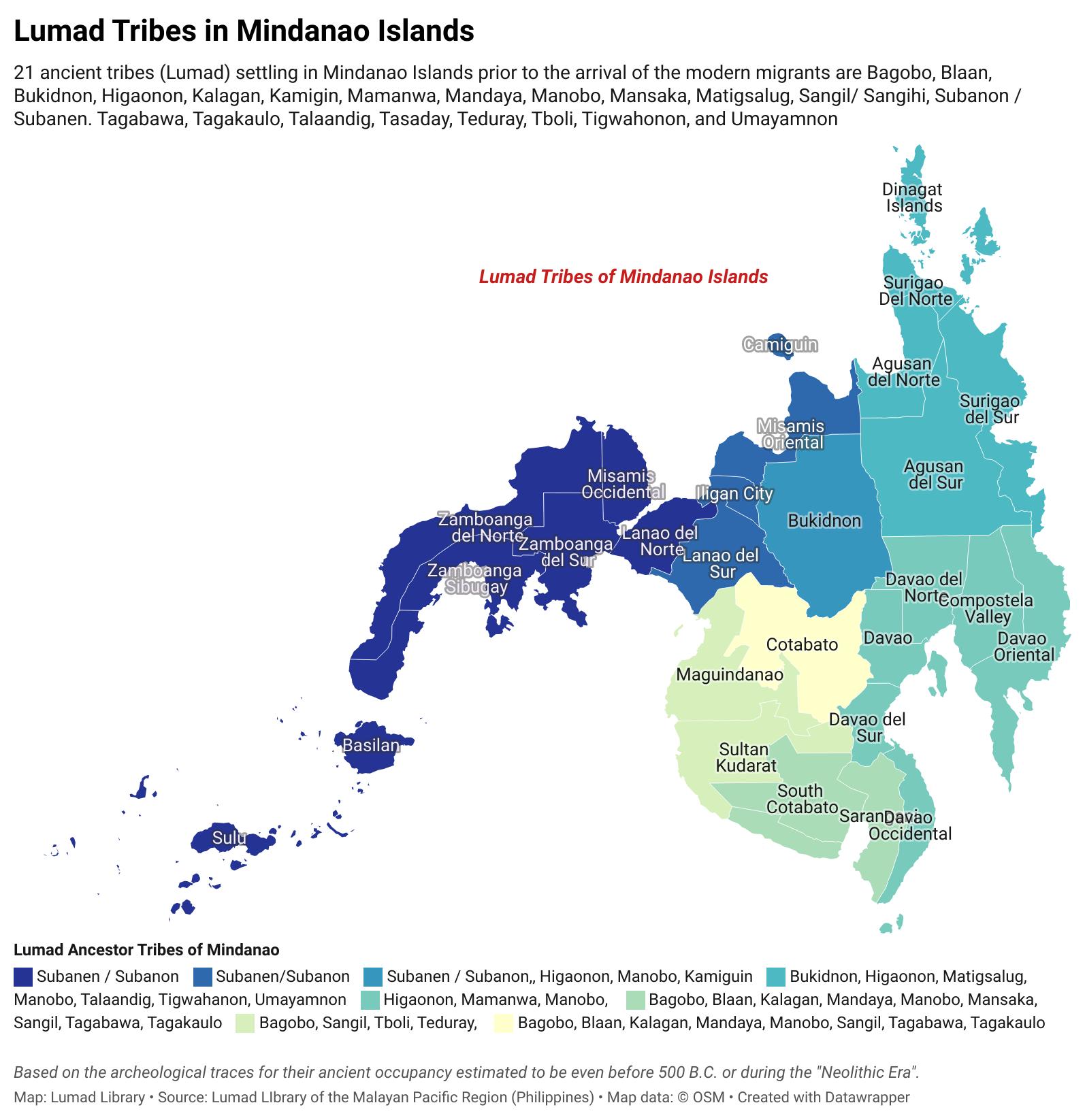
Map of Lumad in Mindanao Islands

The Lumad include groups such as the Erumanen ne Menuvu', Matigsalug Manobo, Agusanon Manobo, Dulangan Manobo, Dabaw Manobo, Ata Manobo, Blaan, Kaulo, Banwaon, Bukidnon, Teduray, Lambangian, Higaunon, Dibabawon, Mangguwangan, Mansaka, Mandaya, Kalagan, Subanen, Tasaday, Tboli, Mamanuwa, Tagakaolo, Talaandig, Tagabawa, Ubu', Tinenanen, Kuwemanen, Klata, and Diyangan. Considered as "vulnerable groups", they live in hinterlands, forests, lowlands, and coastal areas.

The term Lumad excludes the Butuanons and Surigaonons, even though these two groups are also native to Mindanao. This is due to their Visayan ethnicity and lack of close affinity with the Lumad. The Moros like the Maguindanaon, Maranao, Tausūg, Sangil, Sama-Bajau, Yakan, etc. are also excluded, despite being also native to Mindanao and despite some groups being closely related ethnolinguistically to the Lumad. This is because unlike the Lumad, the Moros converted to Islam during the 14th to 15th centuries. This can be confusing since the word Lumad literally means 'native' in Bisayan languages.

=== Bagobo ===
The Bagobo are one of the largest subgroups of the Manobo peoples. They comprise three subgroups: the Tagabawa, the Klata (or Guiangan), and the Ovu (also spelled Uvu or Ubo) peoples. The Bagobo were formerly nomadic and used slash-and-burn agriculture (kaingin). Their territory extends from Davao Gulf to Mount Apo. They are traditionally ruled by chieftains (matanum), a council of elders (magani), and mabalian, female shamans. The supreme spirit in their indigenous faith is Eugpamolak Manobo or Manama.

=== Blaan ===
The Blaan is an indigenous group that is concentrated in Davao del Sur and South Cotabato. They practice indigenous rituals while adapting to the way of life of modern Filipinos.

=== Bukidnon ===
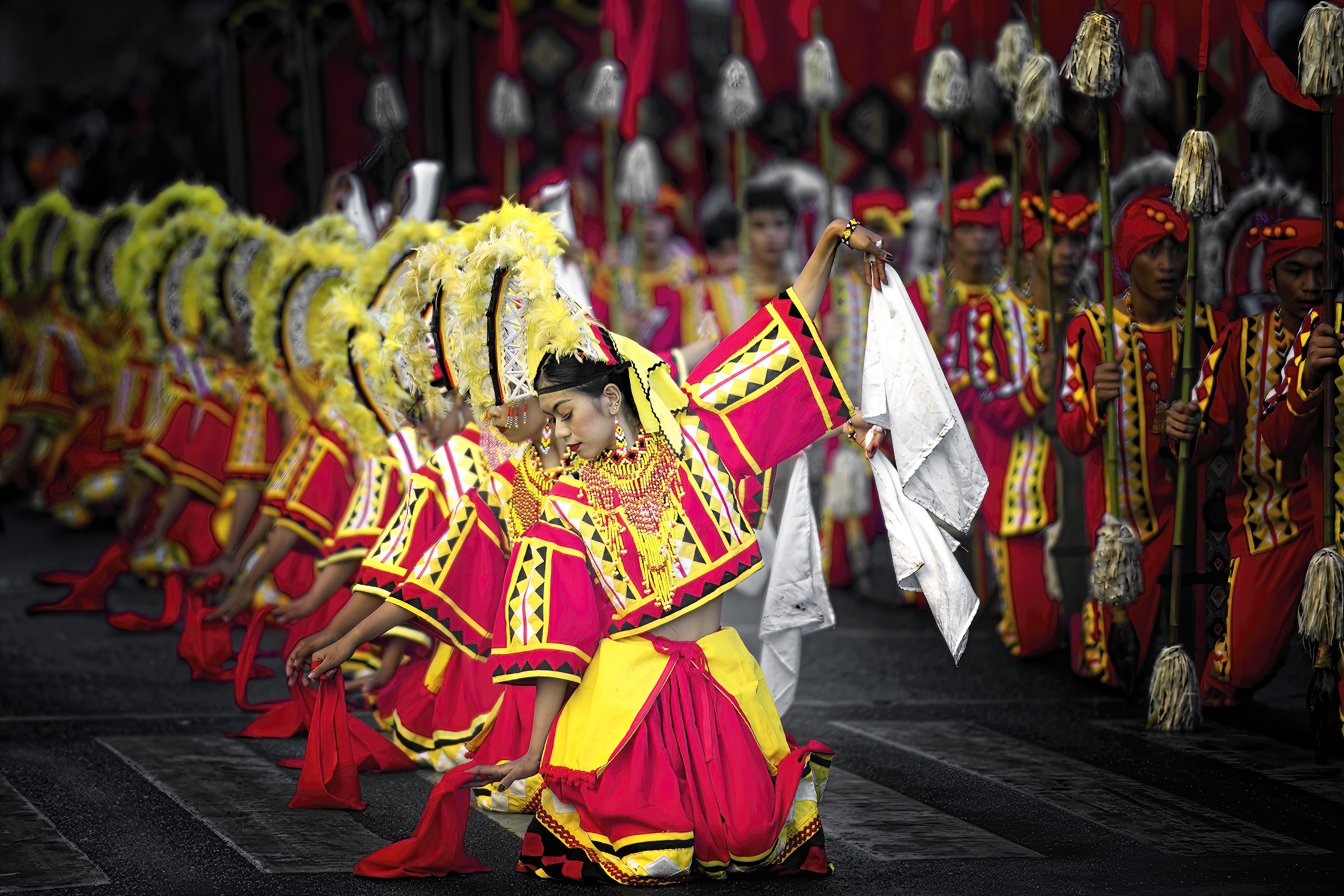
The colorful Kaamulan Festival celebrated annually in Malaybalay City, Bukidnon.

The Bukidnon are one of the seven tribes in the Bukidnon plateau of Mindanao. Bukidnon means 'that of the mountains or highlands' (i.e., 'people of the mountains or highlands'), despite the fact that most Bukidnon tribes settle in the lowlands.

The name Bukidnon itself used to describe the entire province in a different context (it means 'mountainous lands' in this case) or could also be the collective name of the permanent residents in the province regardless of ethnicity.

The Bukidnon people believe in one god, Magbabaya ('Ruler of All'), though there are several minor gods and goddesses that they worship as well. Religious rites are presided by a baylan whose ordination is voluntary and may come from any sex. The Bukidnons have rich musical and oral traditions, which are celebrated annually in Malaybalay City's Kaamulan Festival, with other tribes in Bukidnon (the Manobo tribes, Higaonon, Matigsalug, Talaandig, Umayamnom, and Tigwahanon).

The Bukidnon Lumad is distinct from and should not be confused with the Visayan Suludnon people of Panay and a few indigenous peoples scattered in the Visayas area who are also alternatively referred to as "Bukidnon" (also meaning 'highland people').

=== Higaonon ===
The Higaonon are mainly located in the entire province of Misamis Oriental, as well as northern parts of Bukidnon, western parts of Agusan del Norte, western parts of Agusan del Sur, Camiguin (used to be Kamiguing), Rogongon in Iligan City, and eastern parts of Lanao del Norte. The Higaonons have a rather traditional way of living. Farming is their most important economic activity.

The word "Higaonon" means 'people of the coast' and is derived from the word higa in the Higaonon language, which means 'coastal plains' or 'shore'. Higaonons were formerly coastal people of the provinces, as mentioned. They resisted the Spanish Reducciones policies and were displaced by incoming Dumagat migrants (mostly Visayans) during the Spanish colonial period. Most Higaonon moved to the interior highlands of Misamis Oriental and northern Bukidnon.

The Higaonon people believe in a variety of deities, namely:

- Magbabayà ('The Ruler of All') – The supreme god who has minor gods and goddesses beneath him to do specific jobs and take care of certain things, he is also the god of the west.
- Domalondong – The god of the north.
- Ongli – The god of the south.
- Tagolambong – The god of the east.
- Ibabasok – He watches over the crops and their growth in a simple ceremony at the center of the rice field.
- Dagingon – They worship this deity in an elaborated celebration complete with songs and dances which will last for nine nights during planting and after harvest seasons.
- Bulalakaw – The spirit who watches the rivers and takes care of the fishermen's catch.
- Tumpaa Nanapiyaw or Intumbangol – Watches the base of the earth night and day lest it crumbles.
- Tagabugtà – The spirit who watches the farm or the forest

=== Kalagan ===
The Kalagan, also spelled K'lagan or (by the Spanish) Caragan, are a subgroup of the Mandaya-Mansaka people who speak the Kalagan language. They comprise three subgroups which are usually treated as different tribes: the Tagakaulo, the Kagan, and the Kallao people of Samal, Davao del Norte. They are native to areas within Davao del Sur, Davao de Oro, Davao del Norte (including Samal Island), Davao Oriental, and Cotabato; between the territories of the Blaan people and the coastline. The Caraga is named after them. Their name means 'spirited people' or 'brave people', from kalag, ('spirit' or 'soul'). They were historically composed of small warring groups. Their population, as of 1994, is 87,270.

=== Kamigin ===
A subgroup of the Manobo from the island of Camiguin. They speak the Kamigin language and are closely related to the Manobo groups from Surigao del Norte.

=== Mamanwa ===
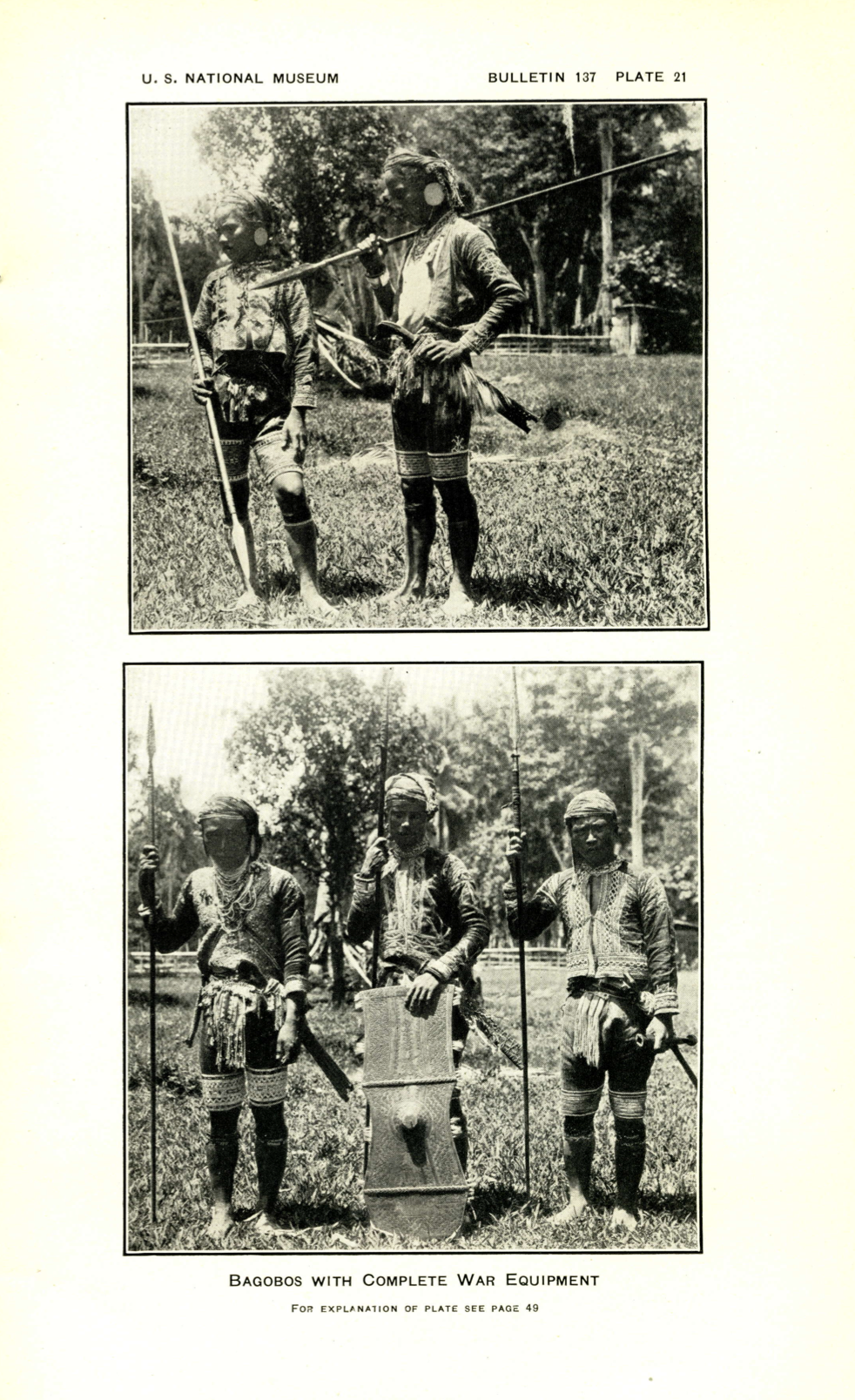
A 1926 photograph of Bagobo warriors in full war regalia.

The Mamanwa are a Negrito tribe often grouped together with the Lumad. They come from Leyte, Agusan del Norte, and Surigao provinces in Mindanao; primarily in Kitcharao and Santiago, Agusan del Norte, though they are lesser in number and more scattered and nomadic than the Manobos and Mandaya tribes who also inhabit the region. Like all Negritos, the Mamanwas are phenotypically distinct from the lowlanders and the upland Manobos, exhibiting curly hair and much darker skin tones.

They are traditionally hunter-gatherers and consume a wide variety of wild plants, herbs, insects, and animals from tropical rainforests. The Mamanwa are categorized as having the "negrito" phenotype: dark skin, kinky hair, and short stature. The origins of this phenotype (found in the Agta, Ati, and Aeta tribes in the Philippines) are a continued topic of debate, with recent evidence suggesting that the phenotype convergently evolved in several areas of southeast Asia.

However, recent genomic evidence suggests that the Mamanwa were one of the first populations to leave Africa along with peoples in New Guinea and Australia, and that they diverged from a common origin about 36,000 years ago.

Currently, Mamanwa populations live in sedentary settlements (barangays) that are close to agricultural peoples and market centers. As a result, a substantial proportion of their diet includes starch-dense domesticated foods. The extent to which agricultural products are bought or exchanged varies in each Mamanwa settlement with some individuals continuing to farm and produce their own domesticated foods while others rely on purchasing food from market centers. The Mamanwas have been exposed to many of the modernities mainstream agricultural populations possess and use, such as cell phones, televisions, radio, and processed foods.

Since the 1950s, Mamanwa communities have migrated from Mindanao to Samar in the Eastern Visayas. The Indigenous communities of Eastern Visayas are composed primarily of Indigenous migrants from Mindanao. The Mamanwas main source of livelihood is rattan-gathering, which they sell at markets in barangays some distance from their settlements. They frequently face discrimination, harassment and social exclusion from Samar lowland populations when they travel to these markets.

Although the Mamanwa continue to use their language within their communities, most are able to speak lowland languages like Waray-Waray and Cebuano. Proficiency in these languages is necessary for economic interaction, as the Mamanwa sell rattan, honey and other foraged products to lowland populations.

The political system of the Mamanwas is informally democratic and age-structured. Elders are respected and expected to maintain peace and order within the tribe. The chieftain, called a Tambayon, usually takes on the duties of counseling tribal members, speaking at gatherings, and arbitrating disagreements. The chieftain may be a man or a woman, which is characteristic of other gender-egalitarian hunter-gatherer societies. They believe in a collection of spirits, governed by the supreme deity Magbabaya, although it appears that their contact with monotheist communities and populations has made a considerable impact on the Mamanwa's religious practices. The tribe produces winnowing baskets, rattan hammocks, and other household containers.

"Mamanwa" (also spelled "Mamanoa") means 'first forest dwellers', from the words man 'first' and banwa 'forest'. They speak the Mamanwa language (or Minamanwa). They are genetically related to the Denisovans.

=== Mandaya ===
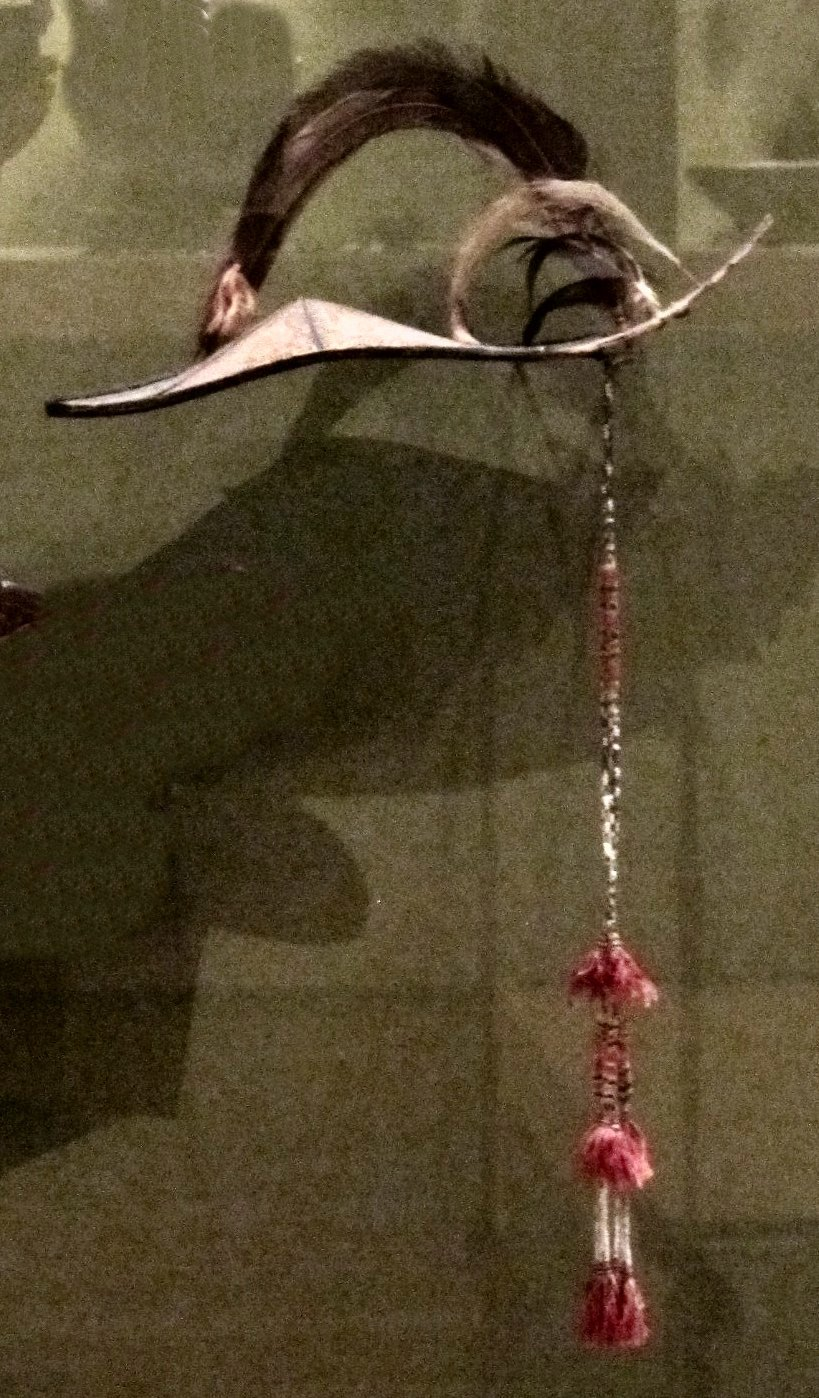
A hat from the Mandaya people made up of palm, bamboo, feathers, cotton, fiber, and beads, housed at the Honolulu Museum of Art.

"Mandaya" derives from man meaning 'first', and daya meaning 'upstream' or 'upper portion of a river', and therefore means "the first people upstream". It refers to a number of groups found along the mountain ranges of Davao Oriental, as well as to their customs, language, and beliefs. The Mandaya are also found in Compostela and New Bataan in Davao de Oro (formerly a part of Davao del Norte Province).

=== Manobo ===
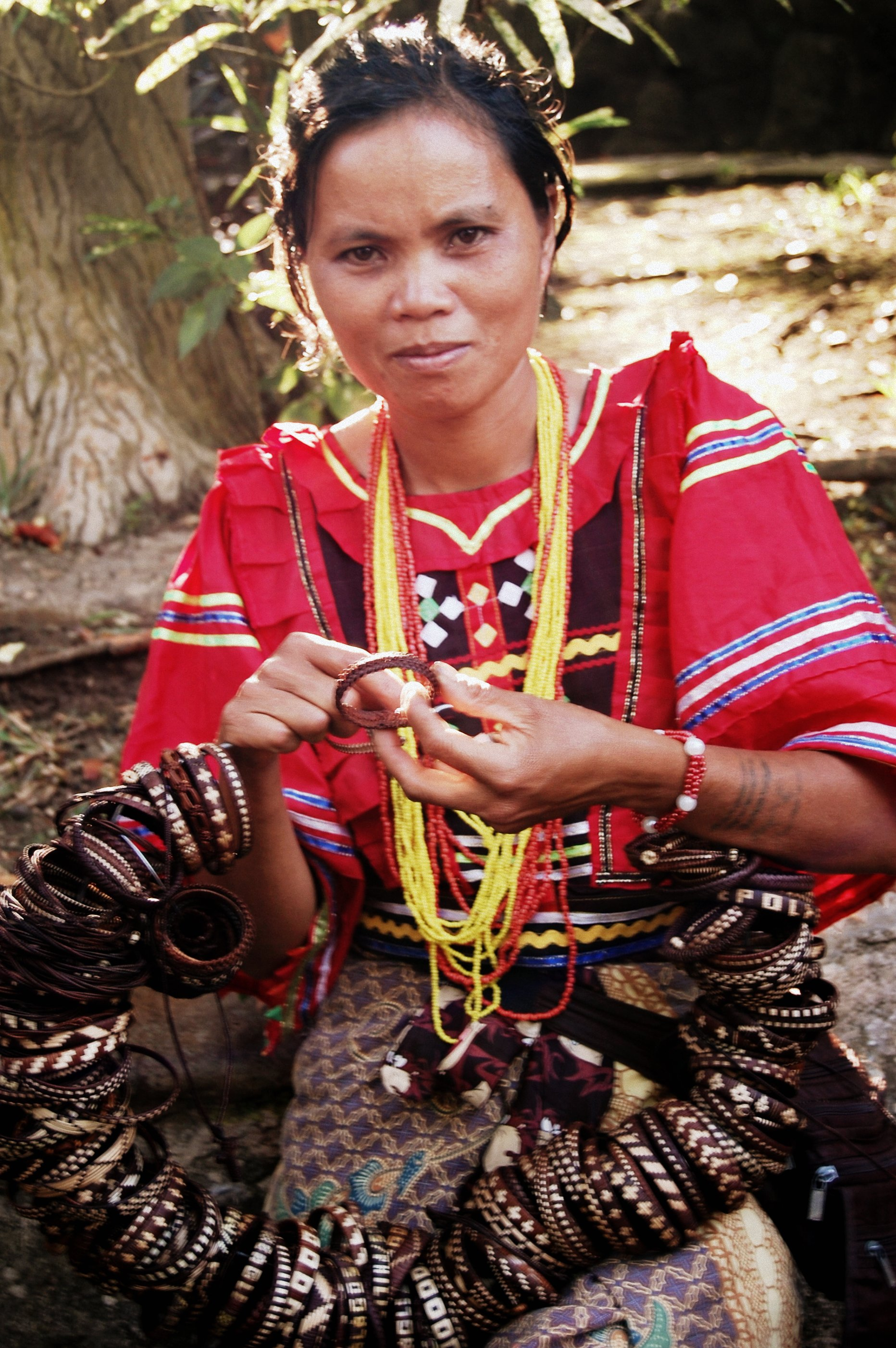
A Bagobo (Manobo) woman of the Matigsalug people from Davao.

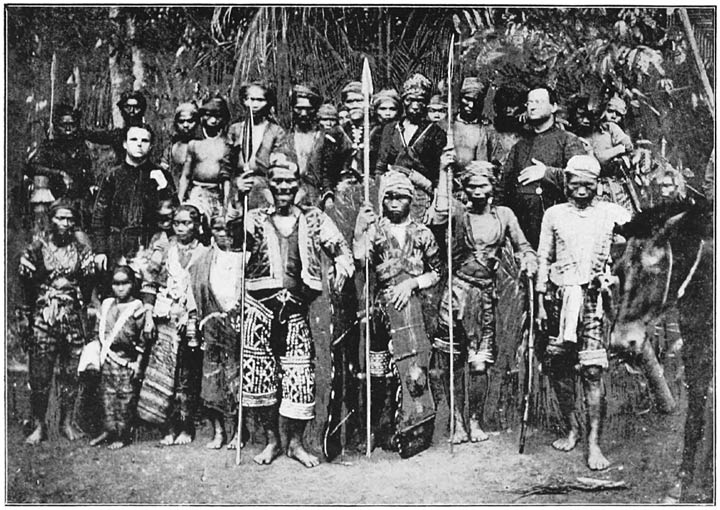
Datu Manib, a bagani of the Bagobo, with family, followers, and two missionaries (c. 1900).

Manobo is the hispanicized spelling of the endonym Manuvu (also spelled Menuvu or Minuvu). Its etymology is unclear; in its current form, it means 'person' or 'people'. It is believed that it is derived from the root word tuvu, which means 'to grow'/'growth' (thus Man[t]uvu would be '[native]-grown' or 'aboriginal').

The Manobos are considered the most diverse among the many indigenous peoples of the Philippines, with the largest number of subgroups within its family of languages. The Philippines' National Commission on Culture and the Arts has been able to develop a tentative classification of Manobo subgroups, but notes that "the various subgroupings are not sufficiently defined" as of the time the classification was developed. The classification divides the Manobo into several major groups: (1) The Ata subgroup: Dugbatang, Talaingod, and Tagauanum; (2) The Bagobo subgroup: Attaw (Jangan, Klata, Obo, Giangan, Guiangan), Eto (Ata), Kailawan (Kaylawan), Langilan, Manuvu/Obo, Matigsalug, (Matigsaug, Matig Salug), Tagaluro, and Tigdapaya; (3) The Higaonon subgroup: Agusan, Lanao, and Misamis; (4) Cotabato: Ilianen, Livunganen, and Pulenyan; (5) South Cotabato: Cotabato (with subgroup Tasaday and Blit), Sarangani, Tagabawa; (6) Western Bukidnon: Kiriyeteka, Ilentungen, and Pulangiyen; (7) Agusan del Sur; (8) Banwaon; and (9) Bukidnon and others.

The total current Manobo population is not known, although they occupy core areas from Sarangani island into the Mindanao mainland in the regions of Agusan, Davao, Bukidnon, Surigao, Misamis, and Cotabato. A study by the NCCP-PACT put their population in 1988 at around 250,000.

The geographical distribution of the subgroups is so great that some of the local groups have been noted to "assumed the character of distinctiveness as a separate ethnic grouping", as in the case of the Bagobo or the Higaonon. Part of what makes the classification more difficult is that a dialectical subgroup's membership within a supergroup can shift depending on specific points of view regarding linguistics.

The Manobo possess Denisovan admixture, much like the Mamanwa. Manobos also hold Austroasiatic ancestry.

=== Mansaka ===
The term "Mansaka" derives from man with literal meaning 'first' and saka meaning 'to ascend', and means 'the first people to ascend mountains/upstream'. The term most likely describes the origin of these people who are found today in Davao del Norte and Davao de Oro and some parts of Davao Oriental, specifically in the Batoto River, the Manat Valley, Caragan, Maragusan, the Hijo River Valley, and the seacoasts of Kingking, Maco, Kwambog, Hijo, Tagum, Libuganon, Tuganay, Ising, and Panabo.

=== Matigsalug ===
Bukidnon groups are found in the Valley in Kitaotao in Bukidnon province, Philippines. Their name means "people along the Salug River (now called the Davao River)". Although often classified under the Manobo ethnolinguistic group, the Matigsalug are a distinct subgroup.

=== Sangil ===
The Sangil people (also called Sangir, Sangu, Marore, Sangirezen, or Talaoerezen) are originally from the Sangihe and Talaud Islands (now part of Indonesia) and parts of Davao Occidental (particularly in the Sarangani Islands), Davao del Norte, Davao del Sur, Sultan Kudarat, South Cotabato, and Cotabato. Their populations (much like the Sama-Bajau) were separated when borders were drawn between the Philippines and Indonesia during the colonial era. The Sangil people are traditionally animistic, much like other Lumad peoples. During the colonial era, the Sangil (who usually call themselves "Sangir") in the Sangihe Islands mostly converted to Protestant Christianity due to proximity and contact with the Christian Minahasa people of Sulawesi. In the Philippines, most Sangil converted to Islam due to the influence of the neighboring Sultanate of Maguindanao. However, elements of animistic rituals still remain. The Indonesian and Filipino groups still maintain ties and both Manado Malay and Cebuano are spoken in both Indonesian Sangir and Filipino Sangil, in addition to the Sangirese language. The exact population of Sangil people in the Philippines is unknown but is estimated to be around 10,000 people.

=== Subanon ===
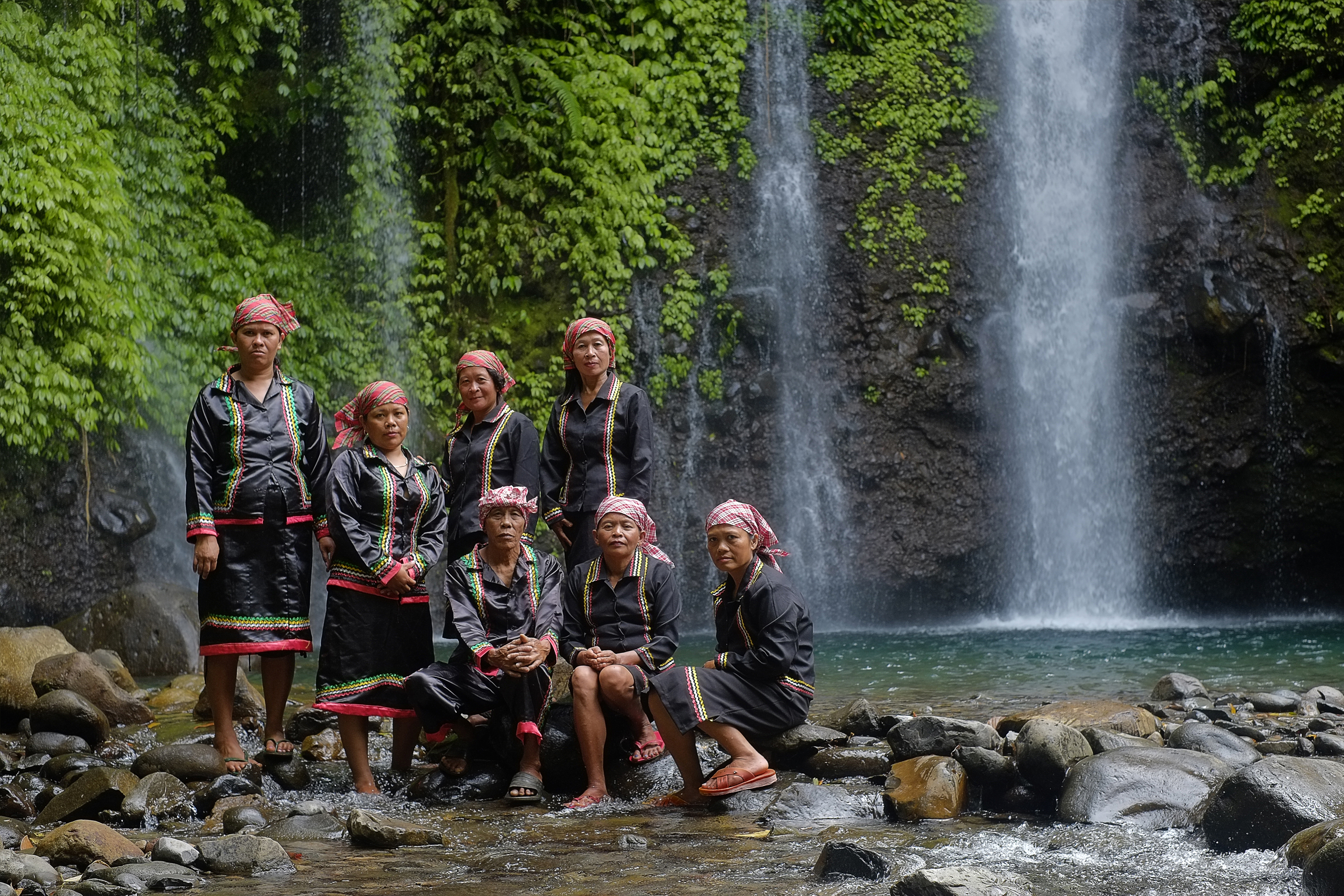
The Subanon people of Misamis Occidental living in the mountains of Mount Malindang

The Subanons are the first settlers of the Zamboanga Peninsula and Misamis Occidental. The family is patriarchal while the village is led by a chief called a Timuay. He acts as the village judge and is concerned with all communal matters.

History has better words to speak for Misamis Occidental. Its principal city was originally populated by the Subanon, a cultural group that once roamed the seas in great number; the province was an easy prey to the marauding sea pirates of Lanao whose habit were to stage lightning forays along the coastal areas in search of slaves. As the Subanon retreated deeper and deeper into the interior, the coastal areas became home to inhabitants from Bukidnon who were steadily followed by settlers from nearby Cebu and Bohol.

=== Tagabawa ===
Tagabawa is the language used by the Bagobo-Tagabawa. They are an indigenous tribe in Mindanao. They live in the surrounding areas of Mt. Apo.

=== Tagakaulo ===
Tagakaulo is one of the tribes in Mindanao. Their traditional territories are in Davao del Sur and the Sarangani Province particularly in the localities of Malalag, Lais, Talaguton Rivers, Sta. Maria, and Malita of Davao Occidental, and Malungon of the Sarangani Province. Tagakaulo means 'from the head(waters)'. The Tagakaulo tribe originally came from the western shores of the Gulf of Davao and south of Mt. Apo. a long time ago.

=== Talaandig ===
Talaandig are originally from the foothills of Mount Kitanglad in Bukidnon, specifically in the municipalities of Talakag and Lantapan.

=== Tasaday ===
The Tasaday is a group of about two dozen people living within the deep and mountainous rainforests of Mindanao, who attracted wide media attention in 1971 when they were first "discovered" by western scientists who reported that they were living at a "stone age" level of technology and had been completely isolated from the rest of Philippine society. They later attracted attention in the 1980s when it was reported that their discovery had in fact been an elaborate hoax, and doubt was raised both about their status as isolated from other societies and even about the reality of their existence as a separate ethnic group. The question of whether Tasaday studies published in the seventies are accurate is still being discussed.

=== Teduray ===
The Teduray people live in the municipalities of Datu Blah T. Sinsuat, Upi in Maguindanao del Norte, and South Upi in Maguindanao del Sur; and in Lebak municipality, northwestern Sultan Kudarat. They speak the Teduray language, which is related to Bagobo, B'laan, and T'boli. Coastal Tedurays are mostly farmers, hunters, fishermen, and basket weavers; those living in the mountains engage in dry field agriculture, supplemented by hunting and the gathering of forest products. Tedurays are famous for their craftsmanship in weaving baskets with two-toned geometric designs. While many have adopted the cultures of neighboring Muslims and Christians people, a high percentage of their population still believe and practice their indigenous customs and rituals.

=== Tboli ===
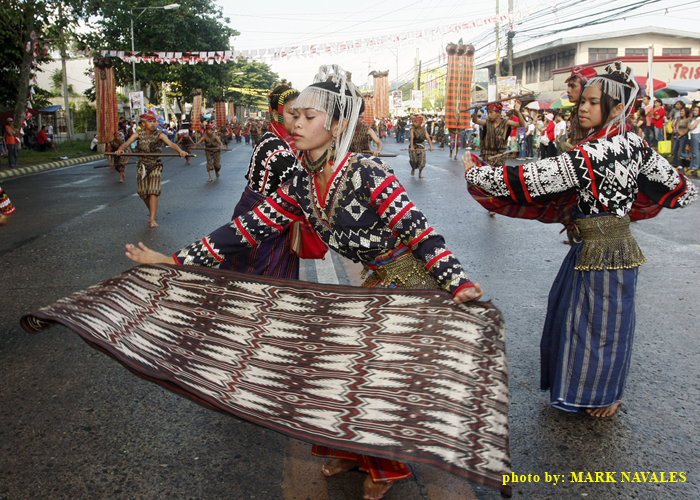
A Tboli dance performed during colorful street dancing competition on the Tnalak Festival in Koronadal, South Cotabato.

The Tboli are one of the indigenous peoples of South Mindanao. From the body of ethnographic and linguistic literature on Mindanao, they are variously known as Tboli, Teboli, Tau Bilil, Tau Bulul or Tagabilil. They self-identify as T'boli. Their whereabouts and identity are to some extent confused in the literature; some publications present the Teboli and the Tagabilil as distinct peoples; some locate the Tbolis to the vicinity of the Buluan Lake in the Cotabato Basin or in Agusan del Norte. The T'boli, then, reside on the mountain slopes on either side of the upper Allah Valley and the coastal area of Maitum, Maasim, and Kiamba. In former times, the T'boli also inhabited the upper Allah Valley floor.

=== Tigwahanon ===
The Tigwahonon are a subgroup of Manobo originally from the Tigwa River basin near San Fernando, Bukidnon.

=== Umayamnon ===
The Umayamnon are originally from the Umayam River watershed and the headwaters of the Pulangi River. They are a subgroup of the Manobo.

== Languages ==
The Lumad peoples speak Philippine languages belonging to various branches. These include:

- Mindanao languages
  - Manobo languages
  - Subanon language
- South Mindanao languages
- Mansakan languages
- Mamanwa language
- Sangiric languages

== Musical heritage ==
Most of the Mindanao Lumad groups have a musical heritage consisting of various types of agung ensembles – ensembles composed of large hanging, suspended or held, bossed/knobbed gongs which act as a drone without any accompanying melodic instrument.

Lumad groups also have traditional stringed instruments, such as the hegalong, and various forms of wind and percussive instruments. Traditional vocal music include love songs, lullabies, funeral songs, narrative songs, and songs about nature. Music may be used to accompany dances in rituals and celebrations.

== Social issues ==
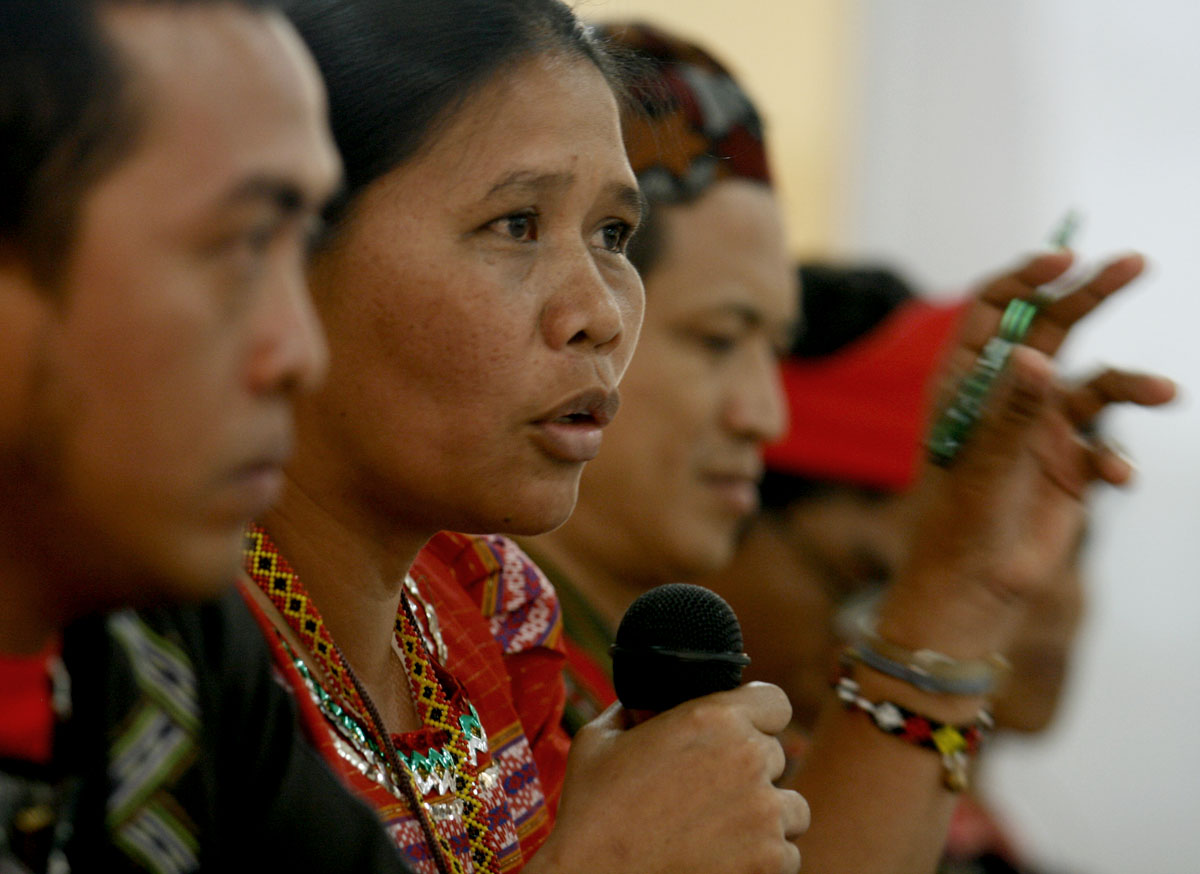
Norma Capuyan, vice chair of Apo Sandawa Lumadnong Panaghiusa sa Cotabato (ASLPC) speaking out in a press conference to defend the ancestral domains of the Lumad

Lumad peoples confront a variety of social issues. Identical with other Indigenous peoples (IPs) across the globe, the IPs in the Philippines represent the country's poorest sector who endure disproportionate access to healthcare, education, and human rights. There are claims that Lumad social issues arise from ethnic grievances that develop into an issue of economic greed. They face loss of ancestral lands due to land grabbing or militarization, economic and social exclusion, and threats to their traditional culture and identity. Lumad groups contend with displacement, extrajudicial killings, harassment of Lumad rights defenders, and forced closure of Lumad schools.

=== Ancestral land rights ===
Lumads face loss of ancestral lands due to land grabbing or militarization. Some communities have been forced out of their lands for resisting encroachment by mining, logging, and energy companies.

At the beginning of the 20th century, the Lumad controlled an area that now covers 17 of Mindanao's 24 provinces, but by the 1980 census, they constituted less than 6% of the population of Mindanao and Sulu. Significant migration to Mindanao of Visayans, spurred by government-sponsored resettlement programs, turned the Lumad into minorities. The Bukidnon province population grew from 63,470 in 1948 to 194,368 in 1960 and 414,762 in 1970, with the proportion of indigenous Bukidnons falling from 64% to 33% to 14%.

Lumad have a traditional concept of land ownership based on what their communities consider their ancestral territories. The historian B. R. Rodil notes that "a territory occupied by a community is a communal private property, and community members have the right of usufruct to any piece of unoccupied land within the communal territory." Ancestral lands include cultivated land as well as hunting grounds, rivers, forests, uncultivated land, and the mineral resources below the land. River systems indicate the Lumad people's generations of civilization. Water is used as a "hermeneutic" for how Lumads orient themselves in relation to other ethnic groups, the state, modern Filipino culture, and their own cultural customs. Unlike the Moros, the Lumad groups never formed a revolutionary group to unite them in armed struggle against the Philippine government. When the migrants came, many Lumad groups retreated into the mountains and forests.

For the Lumad, securing their rights to their ancestral domain is as urgent as the Moros' quest for self-determination. However, much of their land has already been registered in the name of multinational corporations, logging companies, and other wealthy Filipinos, many of whom are, relatively speaking, recent settlers to Mindanao. Mai Tuan, a T'boli leader explains, "Now that there is a peace agreement for the MNLF, we are happy because we are given food assistance like rice... we also feel sad because we no longer have the pots to cook it with. We no longer have control over our ancestral lands."

=== Lumad killings ===
Lumad communities contend with extrajudicial killings and red-tagging. Defenders of Indigenous land rights, environmentalists, and human rights activists have also been harassed.

The Lumad are people from various ethnic groups in Mindanao island. Residing in their ancestral lands, they are often evicted and displaced because of the Moro people's claim on the same territory. The Lumad have lost parts of their ancestral land because of a failure to understand the modern land tenure system. Some NGOs have established schools that teach Indigenous communities how to protect their rights, property, and culture. However, the Lumad communities are located in mountains that are distant from urban areas. These areas are also the sites of armed conflict between the New People's Army (NPA) and the Armed Forces of the Philippines (AFP). Caught in the conflict, the Lumad people's education, property, and security are endangered by the increasing amount of violent confrontations between the armed parties. In Surigao del Sur, a barangay was evacuated to shelter sites in Tandag City because of increasing military and NPA activity. There are claims that Lumads account for about 70 percent of the fighting force of the NPA, with the communists collecting revolutionary tax of P1.2 billion per year in Davao Region alone according to NCIP chief and former army colonel.

Human rights watchdogs, Indigenous peoples groups, and environmentalists claim that Lumad territories were being militarized by the AFP and that community leaders and teachers were being detained by the military on suspicion of being rebels. They also say that alternative schools within the communities (aided by NGOs and universities) face closure or demolition, with some buildings converted for military use. They have staged demonstrations to gain the public's attention, calling for a halt to the alleged militarization of Lumad communities. Organizers of the Lakbayan ng Pambansang Minorya support the Lumad by raising awareness on the plight of Indigenous peoples through protest marches, concerts, cultural festivals, and commemoration of Lumad leaders that have been killed.

The Philippines Commission on Human Rights (CHR) has been investigating the 2015 murder of Lumad leaders and a school official by paramilitary group Magahat-Bagani (in line with the idea of CAFGU) created by the AFP to hunt for NPA members. The AFP denied the allegation and attributed the killings to tribal conflict, though the AFP has admitted that CAFGU has Lumad recruits within its ranks while asserting that the NPA has also recruited Lumad for the group. CHR postponed the presentation of their initial report to December 2015 to include reports of subsequent killings and displacement.

Indigenous women leaders organized the Sabokahan Unity of Lumad Women. Being located in the mountains, community evacuations have become the highest form of protest for the Lumad. Communities pack up and move en masse to urban areas to set up camp in evacuation centers. Through this, the Lumad people emphasize to the public, "We are here, and we are not going back until our land is free from troops and corporations, so that we can take back our ancestral land." Relocating to urban centers allowed Lumad leaders to broadcast their plight to local and international audiences. Shortly after, Lumad people themselves realized they needed to have an umbrella organization through which advocates from around the world could work together, leading to the creation of the Liyang Network. The organization Liyang Network works alongside Lumad communities to amplify the voices of their environmental defenders and highlight Lumad social issues. Liyang Network organizes forums, webinars, and educational discussions on current sociopolitical issues and their root causes—mainly the needs of Lumad and rural communities.

Under the President Benigno Aquino III administration (2010–2015), a total of 71 Indigenous leaders were killed. Ninety-five cases of attacks against the 87 Indigenous schooling for children were also recorded. More than 40,000 Indigenous peoples—whole communities whose social, political, and economic life had been obstructed—had no choice but to evacuate because their schools were attacked or their leaders had been murdered or incarcerated.

On 8 December 2017, human rights group Karapatan asked the United Nations to probe Lumad killings, including the killing of eight T'boli and Dulangan Manobo farmers, allegedly by members of the Philippine Army. A pro-AFP and pro-mining datu of the Langilan Manobo people in Davao del Norte, during an AFP-sponsored press conference, claimed that the NPA were responsible for the killings and that none of the alleged "militarization" was actually happening. Another datu accused protesters in Manila of pretending to be Lumad by wearing Lumad clothing. They have also held anti-NPA rallies in Mindanao. The military has attributed to the NPA the assassination of a Lumad leader sympathetic to the government. Some of which are acknowledged by NPA members.

In 2018, President Rodrigo Duterte threatened to shut down or destroy NGO-funded community schools because of suspicions that they radicalize Lumad students into joining the NPA communist rebels. Lumad leaders working with the military supported the closure, saying that they were being infiltrated by the NPA and their children being exploited. Former Bayan Muna Representative Eufemia Cullamat and convener of the Save Our Schools Network refuted the allegations, adding that ALCADEV students in fact perform well when they enter other schools.

In August 2019, after spending time in refugee camps, Lumad evacuees in Surigao del Sur formally returned to their home after army soldiers left their communities.

In December 2019, the Philippines under Duterte became the deadliest for farmers and Indigenous peoples.

=== Lumad schools ===
Many Lumad youths live in indigent, hard-to-reach communities. In the 1980s, the Tribal Filipino Program of Surigao del Sur (TRIFPSS) began a functional literacy program for Indigenous children in these communities. TRIFPSS established 10 schools in 10 Indigenous people's communities in three municipalities of Surigao del Sur in 1997. The Alternative Learning Center for Agriculture Livelihood Development (Alcadev), formed in 2004 with support from TRIFPSS, established community schools for Lumad communities using lessons tailored to suit Indigenous culture and tradition.

The Department of Education (DepEd) recognized community schools and the Alcadev system through the Indigenous framework of education now observed by alternative tribal schools nationwide. The policy framework was signed in 2012 by then-Secretary Armin Luistro. The Department of Education also accredited and authorized Salugpongan Schools to run 54 community schools in the Davao region.

SOS Network convenor and former Representative Eufemia Cullamat stated that the schools enable IP youths to teach Indigenous traditions needed to defend ancestral lands and preserve Indigenous culture.

==== Bakwit schools ====
Lumad schools faced closure after the schools were alleged to be radicalizing youth into joining the communist insurgent New People's Army, according to National Security Adviser and National Task Force to End Local Communist Armed Conflict vice chair Hermogenes Esperon Jr.

Since President Rodrigo Duterte declared martial law in Mindanao in 2017, 200 Lumad schools had been closed as of 2024, displacing an estimated 10,000 students, according to the Save Our Schools (SOS) network, which campaigns for Lumad students' right to education. Students whose schools were shut down moved to Lumad "bakwit schools" for refugees, organized by parents, teachers, and community elders. "Bakwit" is the local term for "evacuate". The students are from different Lumad communities, such as Mandaya, Manobo, Blaan, and Matigsalo; the teachers come from Bukidnon, Davao del Norte, Davao de Oro, Cotabato, and Sultan Kudarat. The students have taken part in protest rallies and caravans to express their plight to the general public.

In July 2019, Senator Leila de Lima filed a resolution calling for a Senate probe on the closure of Lumad schools. In December 2024, ACT Teachers Party-list Representative France Castro and the rest of the Makabayan bloc filed a resolution in the House of Representatives to investigate the closure of Lumad schools and look into reports of human rights violations.

===== Lumad 26 =====
On February 15, 2021, 22 students (who had evacuated from Davao del Norte), 2 teachers and 2 tribe elders were arrested in a Bakwit school in Cebu without a warrant on 15 February 2021, in what was labeled as a "rescue operation". Philippine media dubbed this raid as "Lumad 26", as they were taken into custody by members of the Philippine National Police's (PNP) Central Visayas office (PRO-7) and charged with illegal detention and kidnapping. Local officials claimed the operation aimed to reunite the children with their parents while human rights groups condemned the raid as part of a pattern of harassment of Indigenous peoples. Video footage of the incident showed police pinning down, cuffing, and dragging Lumad students.

The raid was conducted after six parents reported their children missing. The parents stated that their children were initially taken by a group to continue their studies in Davao City after Lumad schools were shut down by the DepEd, but that they did not consent for their children to go to Cebu City. They said that contrary to statements by the SOS Network that they remained in contact through video calls, they did not know how to use cellphones and their areas were outside of cellphone coverage, and alleged that they have been unable to contact their children since 2018. National Commission on Indigenous Peoples director, Marlon Bosantog justified the operation by alleging the absence of parental consent and the kidnapping of minors. Bosantog also alleged that the students were being used to join rallies and to scam international charity organizations.

In the House of Representatives, Deputy Speaker Mikee Romero, Representatives Eufemia Cullamat, Carlos Zarate, Ferdinand Gaite, Arlene Brosas, France Castro, and Sarah Jane Elago called for an investigation of the raid. Deputy Speaker Benny Abante opined that the raid was unconstitutional and that the arrests were illegal, and called to dismiss the police officers involved. Senator Risa Hontiveros sought to investigate the raid and related issues of violent police operations and the implementation of the Anti-Terrorism Law.

The House of Representatives Committee on Human Rights held an inquiry on the raid on May 26, 2021. During the hearing, the Commission on Human Rights said that they were able to obtain the parents' consent forms for the students. One of the students who was able to take a cellphone video of the raid also testified that she was at the bakwit school with her parents' consent. Lorena Mandacawan, one of the parents and a member of the Parents and Teachers Association of the Salugpongan Community Learning Center, said at a press conference that she and other parents gave consent to send their children to study in Cebu. On May 14, 2021, the Davao del Norte court dismissed charges of kidnapping, detention, and human trafficking against seven of those arrested during the raid.

=== Climate change ===
The Philippines is vulnerable to the effects of climate change and was ranked third globally among countries most at-risk to disasters, according to a 2012 report. Climate change is threatening food security among Lumads whose farmlands are affected by stronger typhoons and more intense droughts. Climate change is also giving rise to various health issues, with Lumad communities reporting health problems brought about by rising temperatures and diseases that spread with changing rainfall patterns, such as dengue.

In 2019, Lumad youth and urban poor children joined the global climate strike to demand protection for environmental activists, protest destructive mining operations within ancestral lands, and promote climate justice.

== See also ==
- Ethnic groups in the Philippines
- Indigenous peoples of the Philippines
- Moro people
- Igorot people
