= Tiruray =

Tiruray may refer to:

- The Tiruray people, a Filipino ethnic group
- The Tiruray language, the language spoken by the Tiruray people
