= South Mindanao languages =

Subgroup of the Austronesian language family

South Mindanao
- Bilic
- Geographic distribution: southern coast of Mindanao
- Linguistic classification: Austronesian: Malayo-Polynesian; Philippine; South Mindanao

Language codes
- Glottolog: bili1253
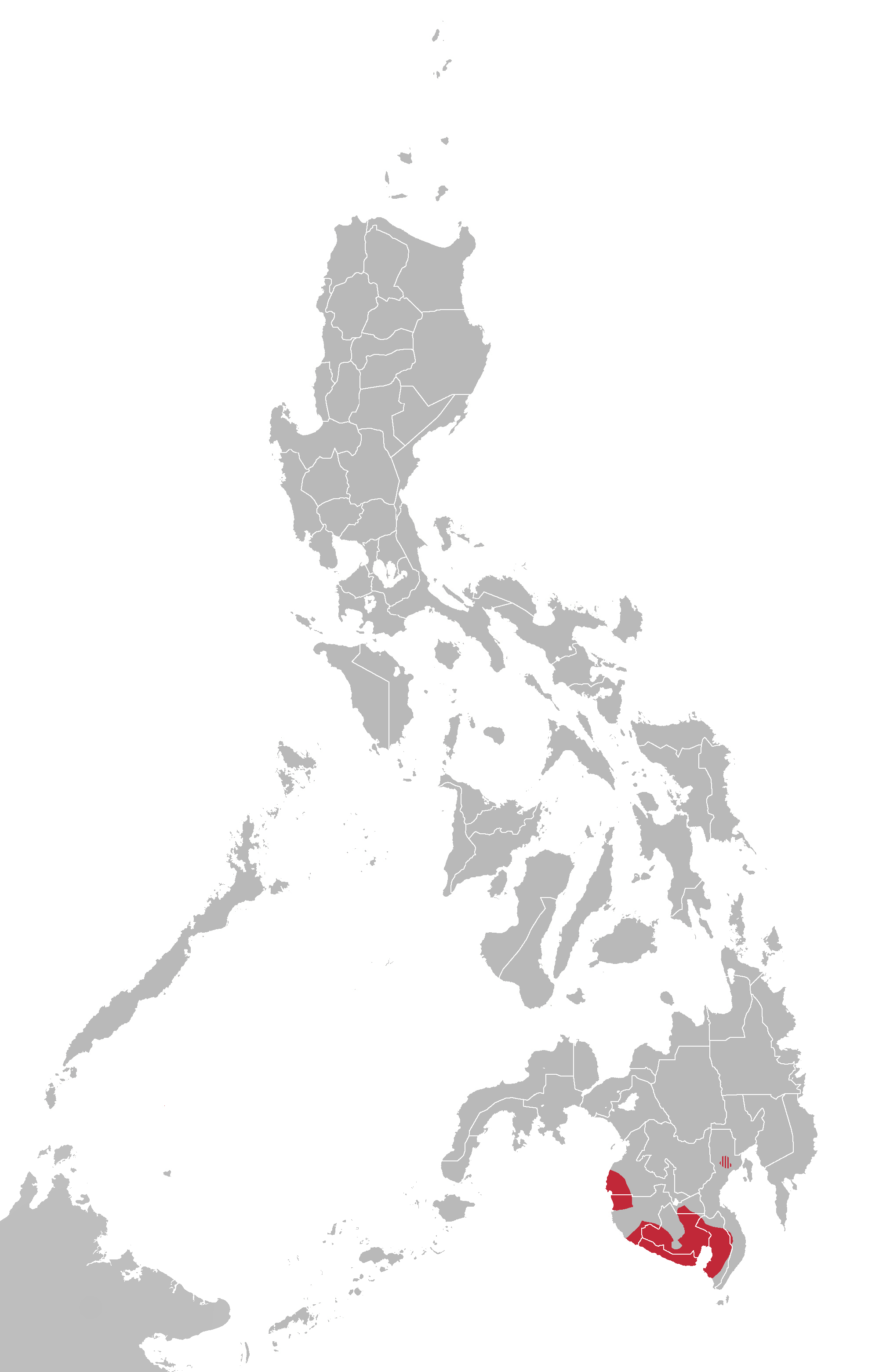
- Areas where Bilic languages are spoken

The South Mindanao or Bilic languages are a group of related languages spoken by the Bagobo, Blaan, Tboli, and Teduray peoples of the southern coast of Mindanao Island in the Philippines. They are not part of the Mindanao language family that covers much of the island. The languages are:

- Blaan
- Klata
- Tboli
- Teduray

== Classification ==
Though it is typically classified as one of the South Mindanao languages, Klata (Giangan) is alternatively considered by Zorc (2019) to be a primary branch of the Southern Philippine languages, with Bilic being classified as a sister branch.

== Reconstructions ==
Savage (1986) reconstructs Proto-South-Mindanaon using Tboli, Koronadal Blaan, and Sarangani Blaan data but not Teduray or Giangan.

== Numerals ==
Numerals in South Mindanao languages
Numeral	Bagobo	Tboli	Teduray	Sarangani Blaan
1	hɔtu	sotu	səbaʔan	sɑtu
2	uwwɔ	lewu	rəwo	lwɨ
3	tɔllu	tlu	tələw	tlu
4	appat	fat	fot	fɑt
5	limɔ	limu	limo	limɨ
6	ɔnnɔm	nem	nəm	nɑm
7	pittu	hitu	fitəw	fitu
8	wɔlu	wolu	waləw	wɑlu
9	hiyɔw	syom	səyow	syəw
10	pɔlluʔ	sfoloʔ	folo	sfɑloʔ
