= Teduray people =

Austronesian ethnic group of the southern Philippines

Tew Teduray
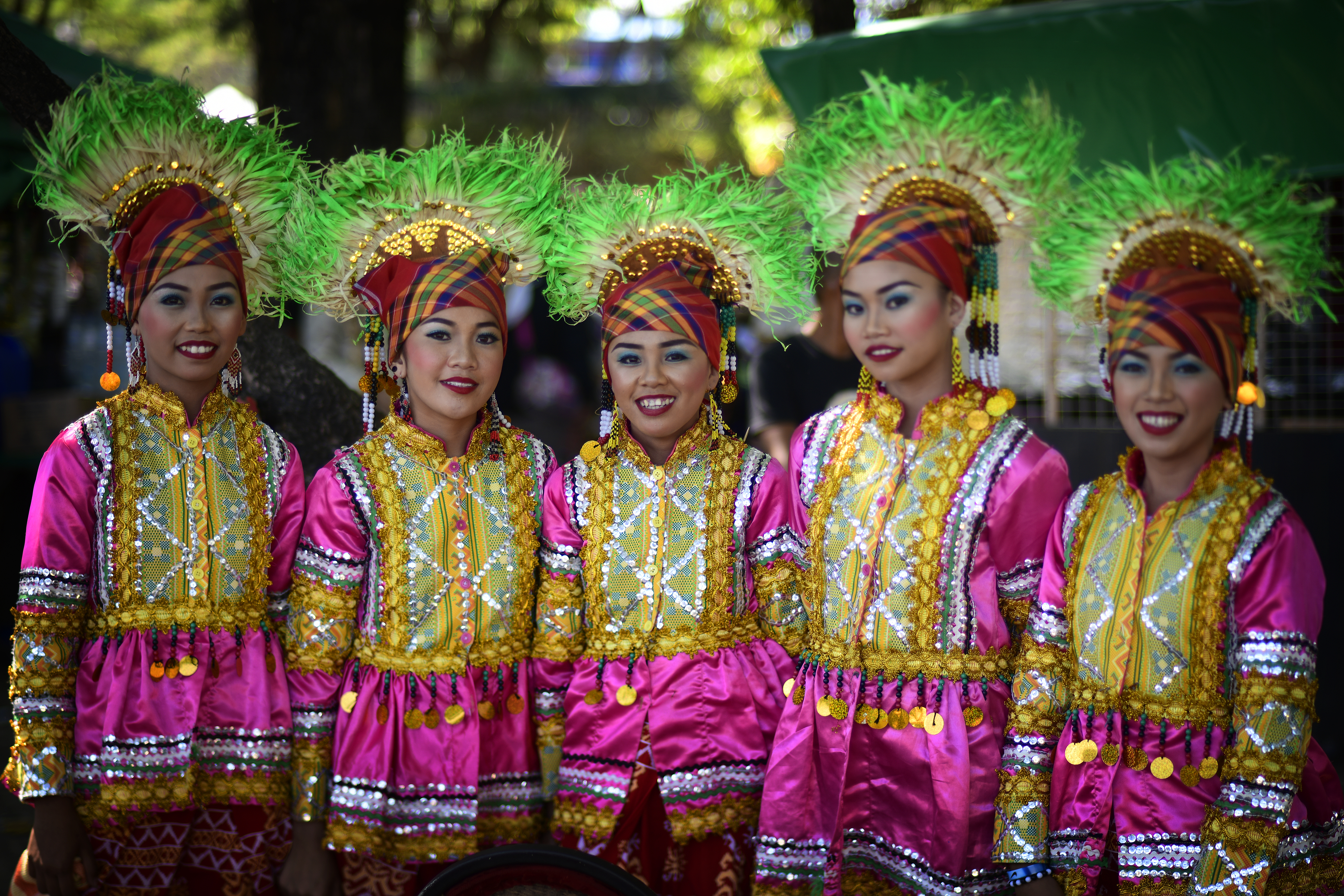
- Teduray girls at Meguyaya Festival of Upi.

Total population
- 138,646 (2020 census)

Regions with significant populations
- Philippines (Bangsamoro, Soccsksargen)

Languages
- Native; Teduray; Also; Maguindanao • Hiligaynon • Cebuano • Filipino • English

Religion
- Folk religion (majority); Christianity and Islam (minority)

Related ethnic groups
- Moro people (mainly Maguindanaon), other Lumad subgroups, and other Austronesian peoples

The Teduray are an indigenous peoples in Mindanao, Philippines. They speak the Teduray language. Their name may have come from words tew, meaning 'people', and duray, referring to a 'small bamboo hook' and a 'line used for fishing'. They live among the larger Maguindanaons and have quite an influence on them, in the highlands between the borders of Maguindanao del Norte and Maguindanao del Sur they inhabit.

The Teduray culture was studied at length in the 1960s by anthropologist Stuart A. Schlegel. Schlegel spent two years as a participant/observer among a group who lived in and was sustained by the rainforest. He was profoundly moved by the egalitarian society he witnessed, and went on to write several books and papers on the subject, including Wisdom of the Rainforest: The Spiritual Journey of an Anthropologist. Despite being referred to as "Tiruray" in out-of-date reference books, the Teduray people do not refer to themselves as such and consider the word "Tiruray" a pejorative.

== Ancestral land ==
The Teduray ancestral homeland is considered sacred. The Teduray, together with the indigenous Lambangian people, originate from the Agusan, Davao, Lanao regions, the province of Bukidnon, and in the cities of Davao and Zamboanga. The Teduray, Lambiangan, and Manobo have jointly applied for recognition of their ancestral domain covering 289,268 hectares of land comprising the municipalities of Upi and Datu Odin Sinsuat in Maguindanao del Norte, the municipalities of South Upi, Ampatuan, Shariff Aguak, Datu Unsay, Datu Saudi Ampatuan, Guindulungan, and Talayan in Maguindanao del Sur, portions of Esperanza, Lebak, Bagumbayan, Senator Ninoy Aquino, Kalamansig, and Palimbang in Sultan Kudarat, and Cotabato City where the indigenous groups are predominantly situated.

== Language ==
Teduray speak their eponymous native Teduray language, which is related to their neighboring Blaan, Tboli, and Maguindanao languages with little or no mutual intelligibility between them at all. Over the years, however, like their Blaan and Tboli neighbors, many Teduray can speak and understand Maguindanaon, Tagalog as well as Hiligaynon, Cebuano, and Ilocano, with the latter four were brought and introduced by these ethnolinguistic settlers from Tagalog-speaking provinces, Central Luzon, Panay, Negros, Cebu, Bohol, Siquijor, and Ilocandia upon their arrival into Teduray homelands during the early 20th century, who in turn learned Teduray language upon contact with these indigenous people such as intermarriage.

== Teduray indigenous religion ==
=== Immortals ===
- Tulus: referred as the "Great Spirit", who was neither male nor female and created all things, including the forest, those that we see (such as humans), and those that we can't see (such as spirits) from mud. Created and re-created humans four times, first due to the non-existence of humans, second due to birthing issues, the third due to Lageay Lengkuos's initiation of the ascending of mankind into the Great Spirit's realm which resulted into the absence of humans on earth, and the last due to another initiation of mankind's ascending to the sky world which had the same effect of leaving the earth devoid of humans. Another name for Meketefu, but also a general term used to apply to the highest deity in each of the layers of the upper regions.
- Minaden: creator of mankind, which was made from mud. Creator of the earth put at the middle of daylight. Taught humans to wear clothes and speak new dialects. Her house welcomes living women who managed to arrive in the upper most level of the upper worlds.
- Meketefu: the unapproachable brother of Minaden. Also called Tulus. Corrected the sexual organs and noses of mankind. Gave one group of people the monkey clothing which can turn anyone into monkeys, while giving another group bows and arrows.
- Monkey Leader: also called "Little Monkey", he is a cultural hero who went to Tulus to intercede for his people, which resulted in his group ascending the upper regions. Two non-believers of his group were left on earth, but he returned to give them earth and a piece of iron which extended from earth to sky. This piece of iron became the source of all iron.
- Biaku: the magic bird who originally provided clothes and beads to mankind. But when a neighboring people attacked the Teduray, Biaku fled.
- Metiatil: married to the hero Lageay Lengkuos, also referred to as Metiyatil Kenogan.
- Lageay Lengkuos: the greatest of heroes and a shaman (beliyan) who made the earth and forests; the only one who could pass the magnet stone in the straight between the big and little oceans; inverted the directions where east became west, inverted the path of the sun, and made the water into land and land into water; also known as Lagey Lengkuwos, was impressed by the beauty of the region where the Great Spirit lives, and decided to take up his people there to live with the Great Spirit, leaving earth without humans.
- Matelegu Ferendam: son of Lageay Lengkuos and Metiatil, although in some tales, he was instead birthed by Metiatil's necklace, Tafay Lalawan, instead.
- Lageay Seboten: a poor breechcloth-wearing culture hero who carried a basket of camote and followed by his pregnant wife; made a sacred pilgrimage to Tulus, and awaits the arrival of a Teduray who would lead his people.
- Mo-Sugala: father of Legeay Seboten who did not follow his son; loved to hunt with his dogs, and became a man-eater living in a cave.
- Saitan: evil spirits brought by foreign priests.
- Guru: leader of the Bolbol, a group of humans who can change into birds or whose spirits can fly at night to hunt humans.
- Damangias: a spirit who would test righteous people by playing tricks on them.
- Male Beliyan (shamans)
  - Endilayag Belalà
  - Endilayag Kerakam
  - Lagey Bidek Keroon
  - Lagey Fegefaden
  - Lagey Lindib Lugatu
  - Lagey Titay Beliyan
  - Omolegu Ferendam
- Female beliyan (shamans)
  - Kenogon Enggulon
  - Bonggo Solò Delemon
  - Kenogon Sembuyaya
  - Kenogon Dayafan
  - Bonggo Matir Atir
  - Kenogon Enggerayur
- Segoyong: guardians of the classes of natural phenomena; punishes humans to do not show respect and steal their wards; many of them specialize in a class, which can be water, trees, grasses, caves behind waterfalls, land caves, snakes, fire, nunuk trees, deer, and pigs; there were also Segoyang of bamboo, rice, and rattan; caretakers of various aspects of nature.
  - Segoyong of Land Caves: take the form of a feared snake known a humanity's grandparent; cannot be killed for he is the twin of the first people who was banished for playfully roughly with his sibling.
  - Segoyong of Pigs: takes its share of butterflies in the forest; feared during night hunts.
  - Segoyong of Deers: can change humans into deer and man-eaters; feared during night hunts.
  - Segoyong of Sickness: sends sickness to humans because in the early years, humans were not nice to him; talking about him is forbidden and if one should refer to him, a special sign of surrender is conducted.
- Woman at Bonggo: the woman at Bonggo who gathers the spirits at the land of the dead in the sky; keeps the spirit of the body.
- Woman beyond Bonggo: the woman beyond Bonggo who keeps the spirit of the umbilical cord.
- Brother of Tulus: lives in the highest abode in the land of the dead, where those who died in battle reside.
- Maginalao: beings of the upper regions who can aid someone to go up in the upper worlds without dying, where usually a female aids a person first, followed by her brother; they sometimes come to earth to aid the poor and the suffering.
- Giant of Chasms: the first one to guard the chasms between the layers of the upper regions; a man-eating giant.
- Spirit of Lightning and Thunder: advises humans about good and bad, to not tease animals, and to respect elders and ancestors.
- Spirit Who Turns Earth into Water: advises humans about good and bad, to not tease animals, and to respect elders and ancestors.
- One Who Forces the Truth
- One of Oratory
- Settlers of the Mountains: each of the eight layers of the upper regions have eight spirits referred as Settlers of the Mountains; they are four men and four women who are appealed to for pity in order to get to the highest ranking spirit in a layer.
- Spirit of the Stars: a spirit higher in rank than the Settlers of the Mountains
- Spirit of the Umbilical Cord: the woman beside the deity Meketefu (Tulus); hardest to get pity from as the people were once unkind to her.
- Malang Batunan: a giant who had a huge house; keep the souls of any false shamans from passing through the region of the Great Spirit.

=== Mortals ===
- Flood Couple: after the great flood, a Teduray boy and Dulungan girl survived and married; their offspring who took after their father became the Teduray, while those who took after their mother became the Dulungan, who were later absorbed by the Manobo.
- Mamalu: an ancestor of the Teduray; the elder sibling who went into the mountains to remain with the native faith; brother of Tambunaoway, ancestor of the Maguindanao.
- Tambunaoway: an ancestor of the Maguindanao; the younger sibling who went remained in the lowlands and welcomed a foreign faith; brother of Mamalu, ancestor of the Teduray.
- First Humans: the first couple's child died and from the infant's body, sprouted various plants and lime.
- Pounding Woman: a woman who was pounding rice one day that she hit the sky with her pestle, which shamed the sky, causing it to go higher.
- Alagasi: giant humans from western lands who eat smaller humans.
- Tigangan: giants who take corpses, and transform these corpse into whatever they want to eat.
- Siring: dwarfs of the nunuk trees.

== See also ==
- Timuay Justice and Governance
