= Kaamulan =

Annual cultural festival in Bukidnon, Philippines

Kaamulan Festival

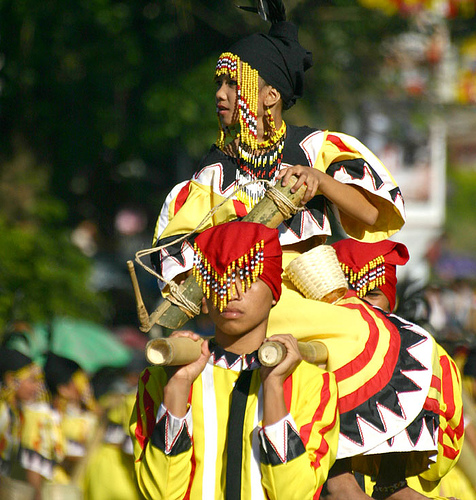
- Begins: March
- Ends: April
- Frequency: Annual
- Locations: Malaybalay City, Bukidnon
- Years active: 52

Kaamulan Festival is an ethnic cultural festival held annually in Malaybalay City, Bukidnon in the Philippines from the second half of February to March 10, the anniversary date of the foundation of Bukidnon as a province in 1917. It is held to celebrate the culture and tradition of the seven ethnic tribal groups—Bukidnon, Higaonon, Talaandig, Manobo, Matigsalug, Tigwahanon and Umayamnon—that originally inhabit the province.

Kaamulan comes from the Binukid word "amul" meaning to gather. Kaamulan is gathering for a purpose—a datuship ritual, a wedding ceremony, a thanksgiving festival during harvest time, a peace pact, or all of these together.

Kaamulan started as a festival on May 15, 1974, during the fiesta celebration of the then municipality of Malaybalay. A town official thought of inviting some indigenous people to town and made them perform a few dance steps at Plaza Rizal to enliven the fiesta celebration. The celebration however proved very popular and together with national coverage the Kaamulan festival has become the regional festival of Northern Mindanao, as declared by the Regional Development Council of Region 10 on September 16, 1977. Kaamulan was formerly held in the first week of September but in 1996, it was transferred to the present date to synchronize it with the foundation celebration of the province until in 2014 it was moved to the month of August in light of the 100th Founding Anniversary of Bukidnon. The festival was cited for having a great potential to be included in the UNESCO Intangible Cultural Heritage Lists.

== History ==
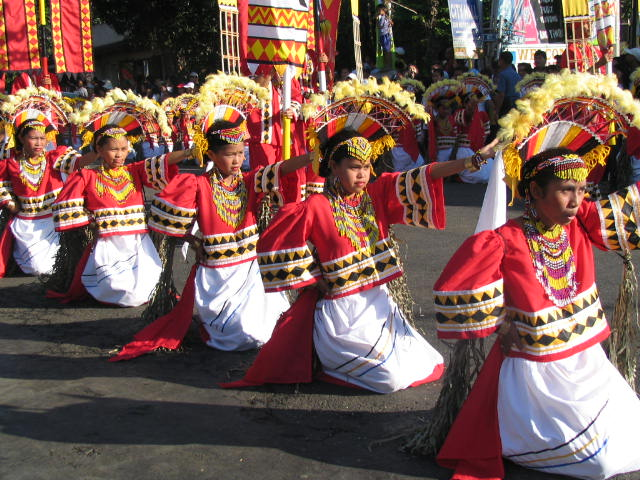
Street dancing, one of the main events during the Kaamulan Festival

- Late 1960s-Early 1970s – Several efforts were made by different individuals in the province to organize a celebration to honor the contribution of the indigenous peoples of Bukidnon to the culture of Bukidnon. Some organize celebrations in Barangay Kalasungay in Malaybalay.
- May 15, 1974 – Kaamulan was conceptualized by the Vice Mayor of the then municipality of Malaybalay, Mr. Edilberto Mamawag who invited some indigenous Bukidnon tribespeople during the celebration of the town fiesta in honor of Malaybalay's Patron Saint San Isidro Labrador. Mamawag thought that few dance steps by the natives at Plaza Rizal would enliven the fiesta-goers.
- September 16, 1977 – Kaamulan was adopted as the regional festival of Northern Mindanao through a Regional Development Council resolution
- November 25–27, 1977 – The first organized Kaamulan Festival was held in the province of Bukidnon and sponsored by the provincial government. Marks the formal establishment of the festival in the province.
- 1978-1998 – Kaamulan was held every first Friday of September
- 1999 – Date of Kaamulan was moved from September to the second half of February up to March 10, the Foundation Day celebration of the Province of Bukidnon
- 2002 – President Gloria Macapagal-Arroyo graced the celebration, where several native women dressed on her in an ethnic costume. First Kaamulan Off-Road Challenge and First Kaamulan Invitational Shoot Fest were added to the activities of the festival. Bansagen, an exhibit of Bukidnon contemporary art done by a group of Bukidnon-based artists, was done for the first time.
- 2006 – The First National Folklore Conference was held in consonance with the celebration of the Kaamulan Festival. An indigenous song writing clinic for students and the general public was held. The champion for the street dancing competition is the municipality of Malitbog.
- 2007 – Marks the 30th year celebration by the province of the Kaamulan Festival from its formal date of establishment (1977). Theme of the celebration is "Spiritual Awakening". Also marks the 90th Foundation Day celebration of the province of Bukidnon. The municipality of Kibawe won the street dancing competition, followed by Talakag and Malaybalay City. Kitaotao won the Float Competition, followed by Kadingilan and Kibawe.

== The Seven Tribes Of Bukidnon ==
The typical Indigenous People of this Province are broadly identified into two ethnical origins namely: the Bukidnon and the Manobo. The Bukideño have distinct physical characteristics whom may be describe as with slight build bodies, slanting eyelets, relatively high noses with lips that ranges from medium and brown to light skin color. They speak binukid, which is distinctive with up and down tone unlike other dialects. While the Manobo is a Negrito mixture and resembles to have small bodies, dark skin, curly hair with broad to flat noses. Socially, the so-called Bukidnon live in the relative flatlands of the Bukidnon plateau and have already adopted Christian ways and utilized modern technology while the Manobos live in the mountains and do not want to mingle with the Christians and other people. It is believed that Bukidnon have a more advanced stage of development and who have developed their own culture and traditions.

The Bukidnon tribes were classified as lowlands and socially acculturated Christians adopting modern technology through educational enhancement. These are the following:

Tribe	Classification
Talaandig	People from Lantapan and Talakag who choose to call themselves as such when Panamin took custody of them since September 18, 1975. the women of this tribe are expert embroiderers and patchwork makers. They are semi-sedentary.
Manobo	These people are natives of the municipalities of Pangantucan, Kalilangan and Kadingilan. Manobo in Kadingilan is mixed with muslim blood. These speak a quaint archaic language of their own which cannot be understood by the lowland Bukidnon and other ethnic groups in the province. Others lived in the municipalities of Don Carlos, Kitaotao, Kibawe, Quezon and Damulog.
Umayamnon	Highly nomadic Bukidnon Manobo with fine skills in beadwork and brass jewelry. These people live along the watershed of Umayam River. They are reserved and quiet, fair skinned with prominent checkbones and wear beaded turban without hair.
Matigsalug	People of Salug River specifically in The Municipality of Kitaotao, Bukidnon and some in Sinuda.
Tigwahonon	People along the watershed of Tigwa River and in the Tigwa-salug Valley. They are loud spoken people and the traders among the hinterland ethnic groups
Higaonon	Originally people of the coast (of Northern Mindanao), but have since migrated further inland. They are situated in the provinces of Agusan del Sur, Misamis Oriental and Bukidnon. Planting of Rice, corn and vegetables are their means of living.
Bukidnon	The lowlanders. Acculturated Bukidnons who have adapted Christian ways and utilized modern technology living in the lowlands among Christians.

== Gallery ==
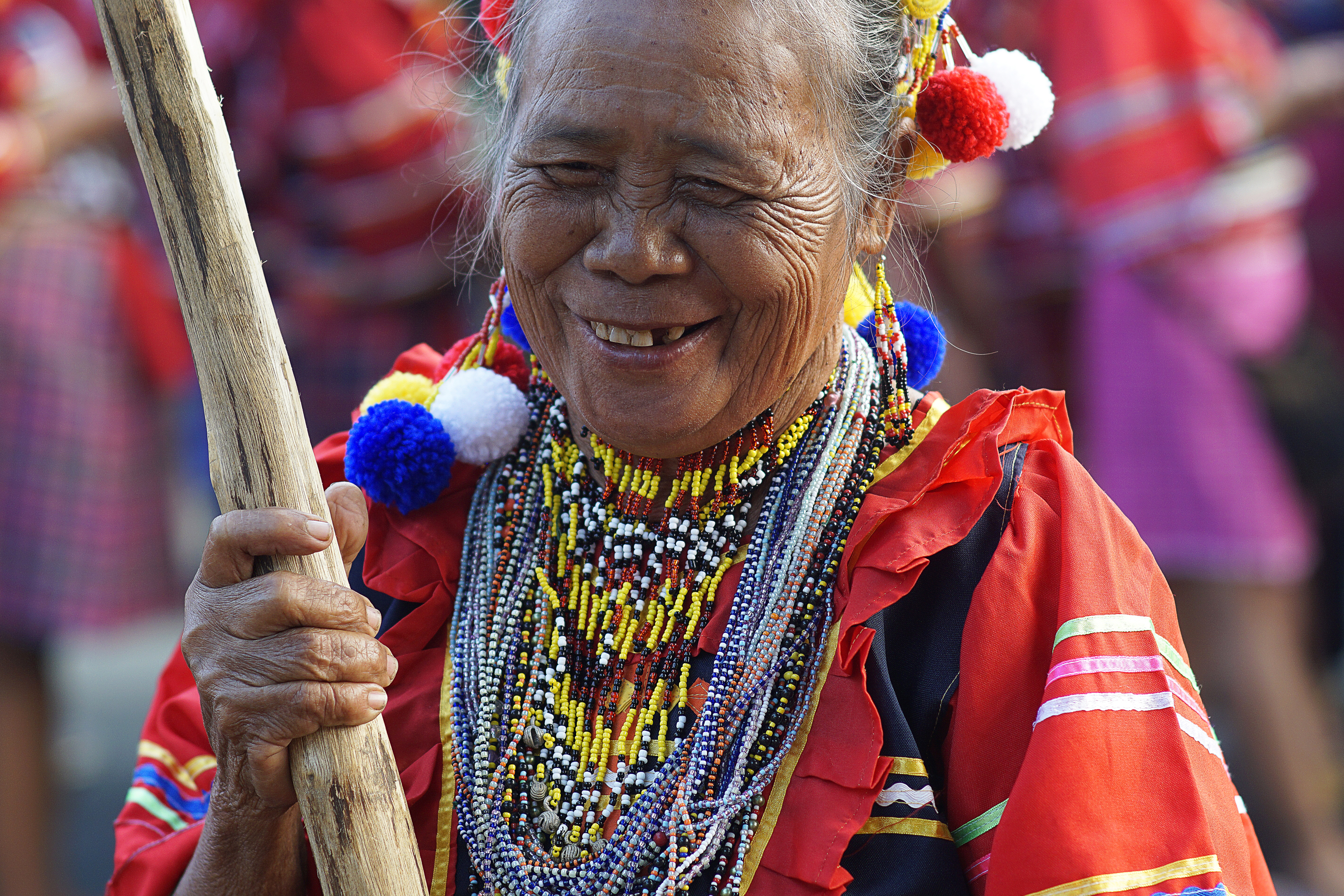

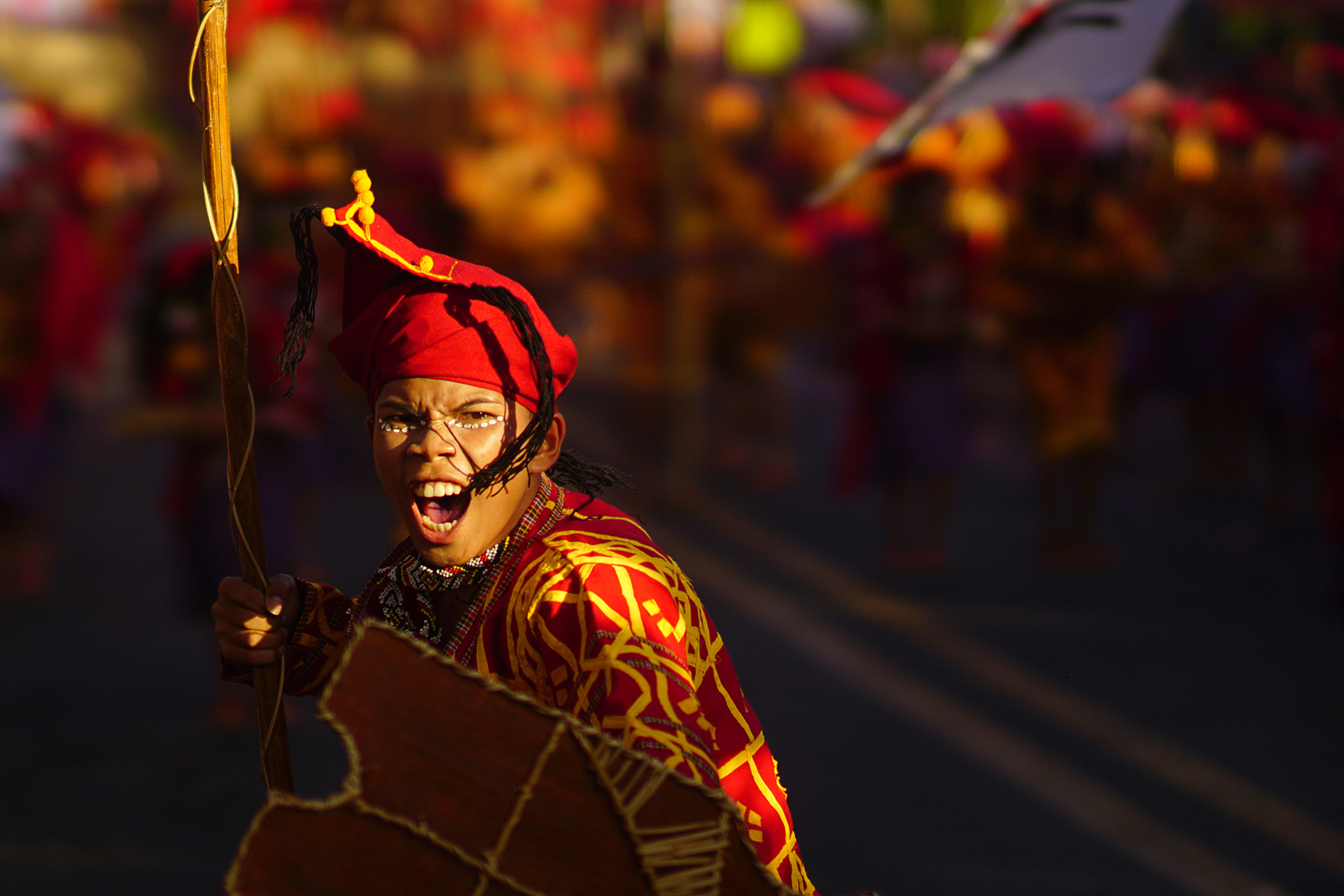

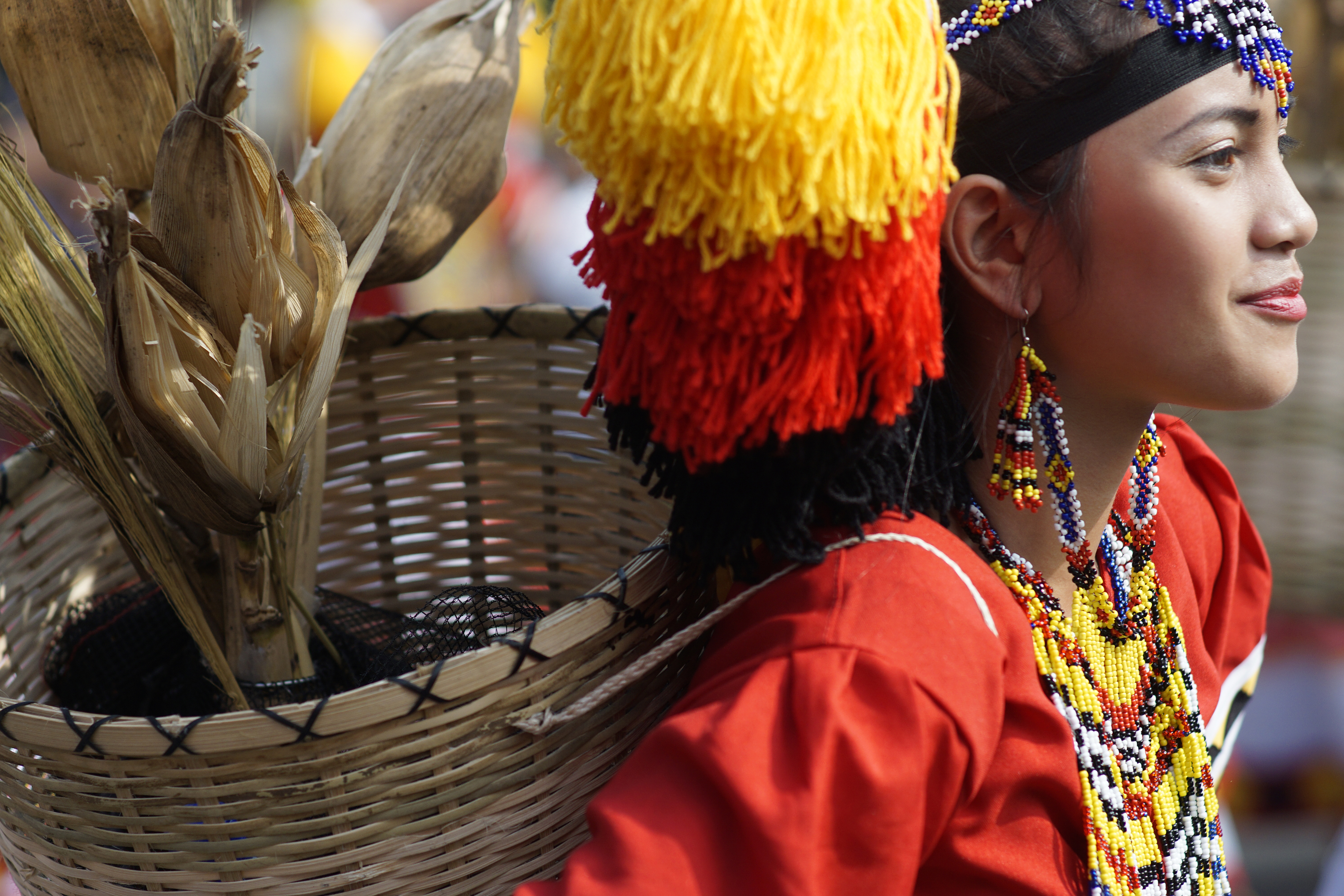

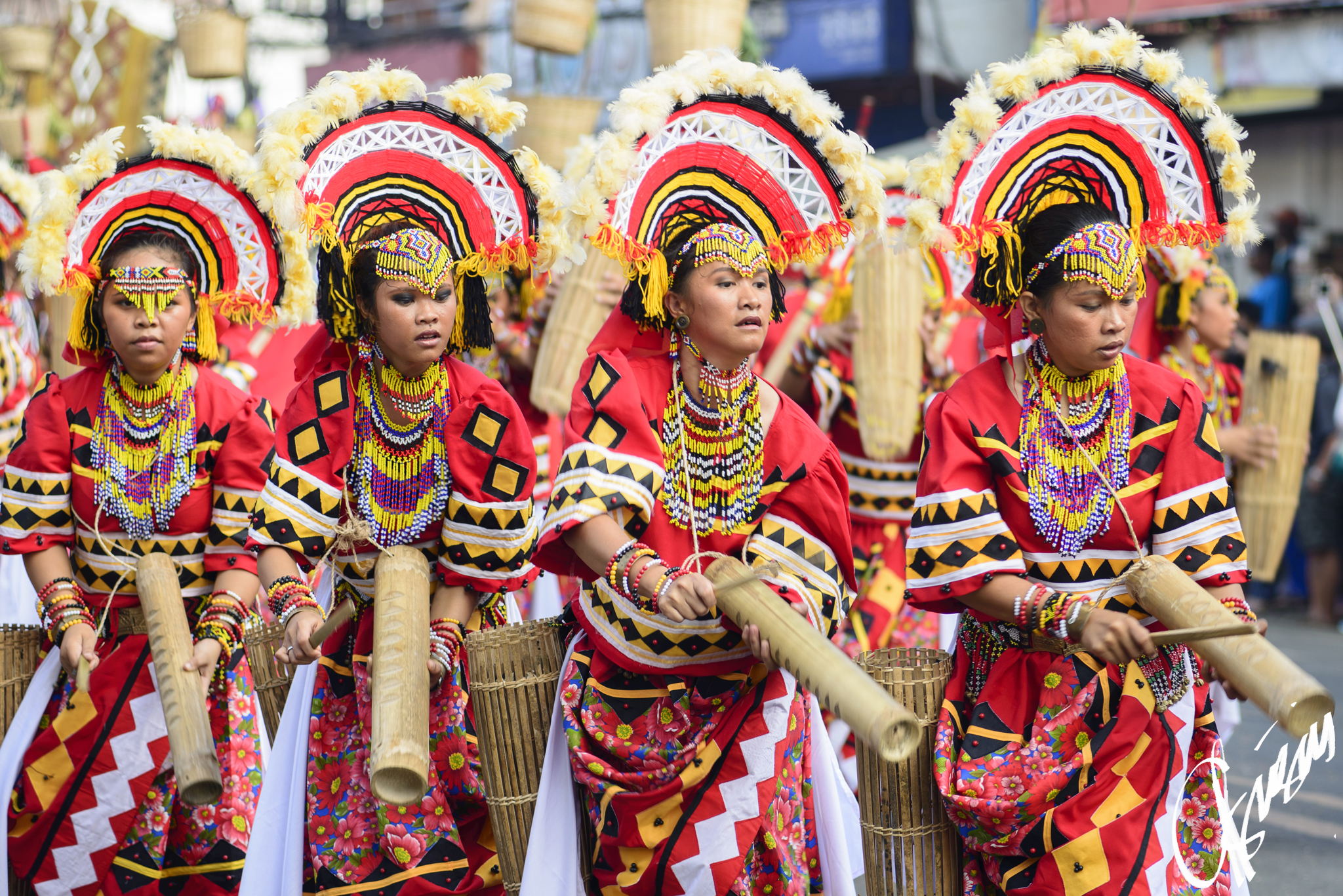

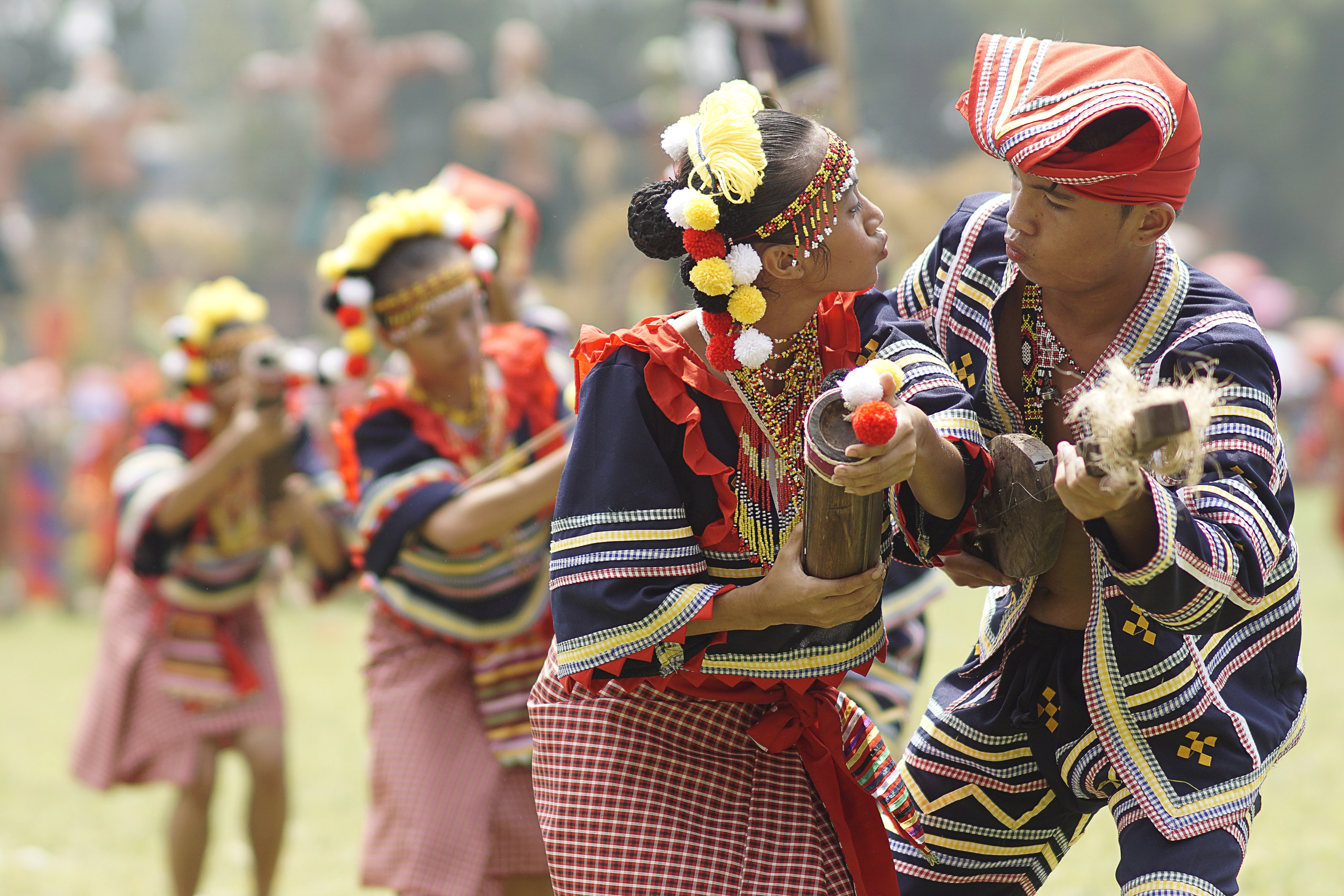

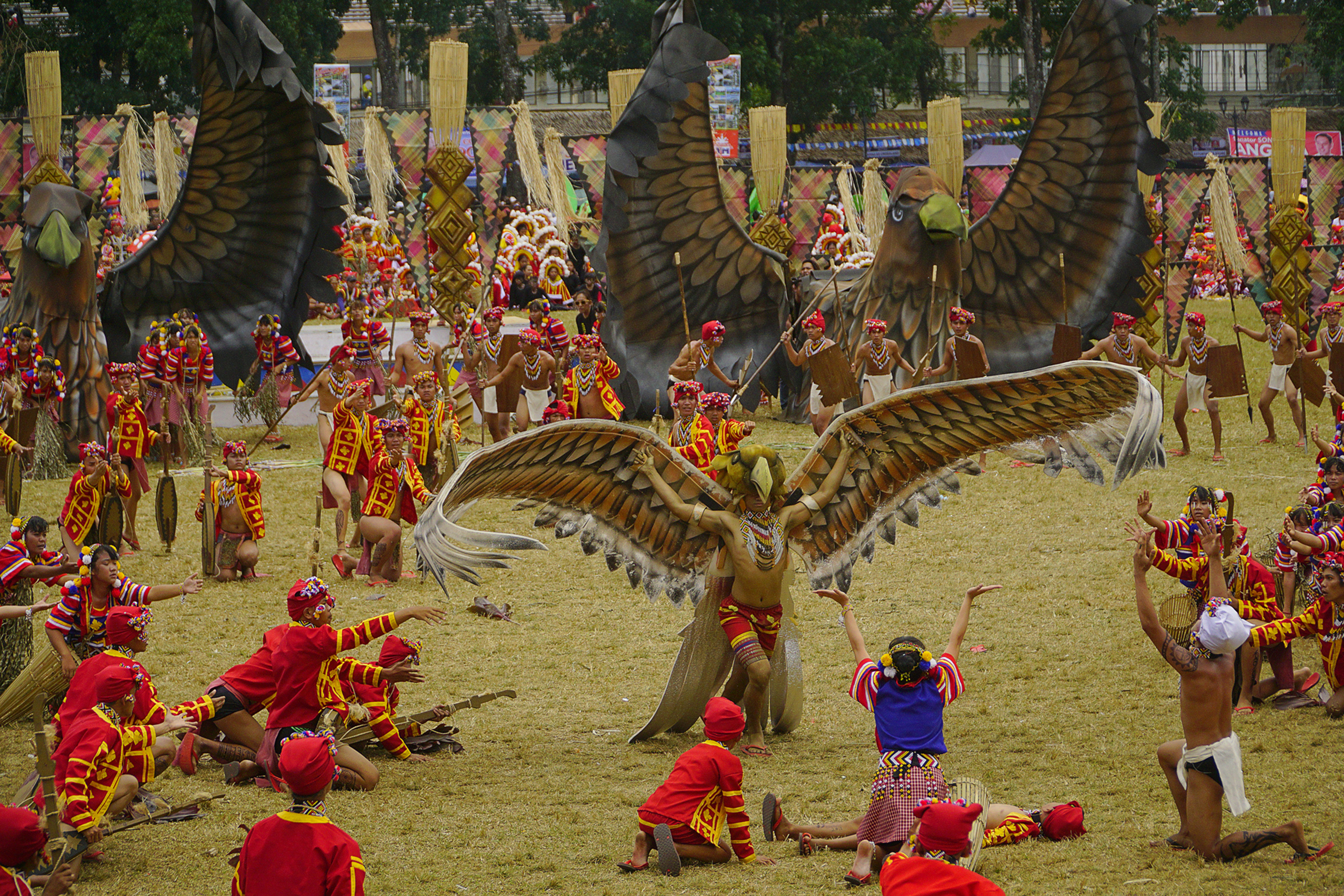

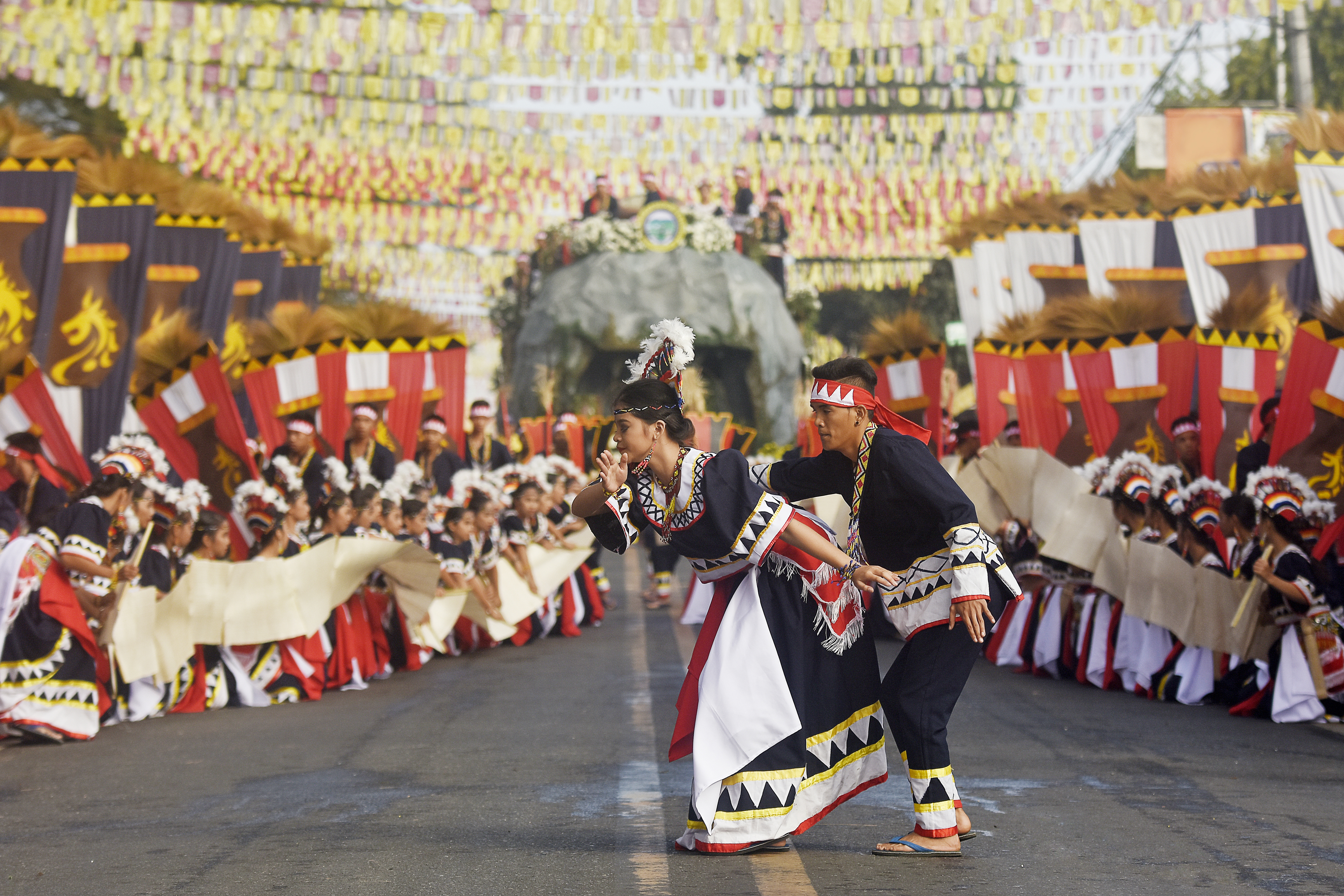
