= Timuay Justice and Governance =

- Kësëfananguwit Timuay
- Abbreviation: TJG
- Formation: October 4, 1995; 31 years ago
- Type: Tribal government (Timuay system)
- Legal status: Indigenous Political Structure
- Purpose: Self-governance by the Teduray and Lambangian peoples
- Location: Datu Odin Sinsuat, Maguindanao del Norte, Philippines
- Region served: Maguindanao and Sultan Kudarat

The Timuay Justice and Governance (TJG; Kësëfananguwit Timuay) is an Indigenous Political Structure (IPS) and a form of indigenous leadership structure and mechanism appropriate to the Tëduray and Lambangian since time immemorial to the present as an expression of pursuing their right to self-determination..

== History ==
The Timuay Justice and Governance had its first tribal congress (Timfada Limod) on October 4, 1995, a date which the indigenous government considers as its foundation date. The Indigenous Peoples' Rights Act (IPRA) of 1997 became law leading to the TJG being recognized as an Indigenous Political Structure (IPS).

The Tëduray and Lambangian peoples has urged for the full implementation of the IPRA Law under the Autonomous Region in Muslim Mindanao which would allow them to govern and control their ancestral domain. They held the second tribal congress in October 2010, and the third in April 2017.

The National Commission on Indigenous Peoples facilitated the delineation process for the Tëduray–Lambangian's ancestral domain for two decades.

However, in 2019 when the Bangsamoro autonomous region was formed, the Bangsamoro Transition Authority halted the process citing jurisdiction issues and believes that the newly formed Ministry of Indigenous Peoples' Affairs (MIPA) has sole authority to delineate ancestral lands within the region.

== Government and ancestral land ==
The TJG governs over the Tëduray and Lambangian peoples. It lays claim to ancestral domain in the Maguindanao and portions of Sultan Kudarat measuring 2,083 km^{2} (804 sq mi) for both peoples. The Tëduray–Lambangian call their territory as fusaka inged and their indigenous peoples' law consist of ukit and tegudon (creed). Their justice system is called the tiyawan.

== Activities ==
The TJG has also campaigned for Lumad representation when the Bangsamoro Organic Law was being drafted. It also documented killings of non-Moro people and has urged local governments to resolve this issue.
