= Tboli language =

Austronesian language

Tboli
- Tagabili
- Native to: Philippines
- Region: Mindanao
- Ethnicity: Tboli
- Native speakers: (95,000 cited 2000)
- Language family: Austronesian: Malayo-Polynesian; Philippine; South Mindanao; Tboli

Language codes
- ISO 639-3: tbl
- Glottolog: tbol1240

Tboli (IPA: [tᵊˈbɔli]), also Tau Bilil, Tau Bulul or Tagabili, is an Austronesian language spoken in the southern Philippine island of Mindanao, mainly in the province of South Cotabato but also in the neighboring provinces of Sultan Kudarat and Sarangani. According to the Philippine Census from 2000, close to 100,000 Filipinos identified T'boli or Tagabili as their native language.

== Classification ==
Tboli is classified as a member of the South Mindanao or Bilic branch of the Philippine language families. The closest language to it is Blaan. Both are also related to Bagobo, and Tiruray.

== Geographic distribution ==
Tboli is spoken in the following areas (Ethnologue).

- South Cotabato Province: Mount Busa area and west
- Sarangani Province: Celebes seacoast, Katabau west to provincial border
- Sultan Kudarat Province: Kraun area and Bagumbayan municipality

Dialects are Central Tboli, Western Tboli, and Southern Tboli (Ethnologue).

== Phonology ==
=== Phonemic inventory ===
Awed, Underwood & Van Wynen (2004) list seven vowel phonemes, namely /a i ə ɛ o ɔ u/ and 15 consonant phonemes shown in the chart below. Note that Tboli lacks /p/ as a phoneme and has /f/ instead, which is a typological rarity among Philippine languages.

		Labial	Coronal	Dorsal	Glottal
Nasal		m	n	ŋ ⟨ng⟩	
Stop	voiced	b	d	g	
Stop	voiceless		t	k	ʔ ⟨–⟩
Fricative		f	s		h
Approximant		w	l	j ⟨y⟩	

=== Stress ===
Final stress is the norm in Tboli root words; however, the stress shifts to the previous syllable if the final vowel is a schwa.

=== Phonotactics ===
Unlike most other Philippine languages and Austronesian languages in general, Tboli permits a variety of consonant clusters at the onset of a syllable. This is evident in the name of the language, /tbɔli/, but also in other words like /kfung/ 'dust', /sbulon/, 'one month,' /mlɔtik/ 'starry,' /hlun/ 'temporarily,' /gna/ 'before,' and others.

Awed, Underwood & Van Wynen (2004) observe impressionistically there is a very short schwa pronounced in between the consonant cluster. However, these consonant clusters have not yet been analyzed acoustically.

== Grammar ==
=== Nouns ===
Unlike other Philippine languages, Tboli does not make use of case-marking articles.

Plurality is marked by the article kem preceding the noun; kudà 'horse' (sg.), kem kudà 'horses.'

=== Pronouns ===
Tboli pronouns indicate person, number, clusivity, and grammatical role. Awed, Underwood & Van Wynen (2004) group Tboli pronouns into two main categories based on what they term "focus," which appear to be related to the absolutive-ergative case system in other Philippine languages. There are two further subcategories for each which deal with whether the singular pronouns behave as enclitics or as independent words. Their use depends on their role and position in a sentence.

	Focused		Nonfocused	
	dependent	independent	dependent	independent
1st singular	-e	ou/o	-u	dou/do
2nd singular	-i	uu/u	-em/-m	kóm
3rd singular	ø	du	-en/n	kun
1st person dual	te	tu	te	kut
1st inclusive	tekuy			
1st exclusive	me	mi	mi	kum
2nd plural	ye	yu	ye	kuy
3rd plural	le	lu	le	kul

Examples using the third person plural pronoun.

- Mken le. 'They eat.' (focused, dependent pronoun).
- Lu mken. 'They are the ones who ate.' (focused, independent pronoun)
- Balay le. 'Their house.' (nonfocused, dependent pronoun).
- Dwata semgyok kul. 'May God take care of them.' (nonfocused, independent pronoun).

=== Syntax ===
Word order in Tboli is usually verb-subject-object, though there is some variation.

Mulu le sfu soging.
planted they shoot banana
"They planted banana shoots."

=== Verbs ===
Tboli, like other Philippine languages, makes a distinction between transitive and intransitive verbs. Intransitive verbs are marked with the affix me- while transitive verbs are marked with ne-. Unlike Philippine languages, applicative affixes are not used in Tboli though prepositions are used instead.

Furthermore, aspect marking is not marked on the verb but with preverbal aspect markers such as deng (completed actions) and angat (incomplete action).

=== Morphology ===
Tboli makes use of prefixes and infixes. Awed, Underwood & Van Wynen (2004) claim that suffixes do not exist in the language, though proclitic affixes may be thought of as such.

== Writing system ==
Tboli has no official writing system, though the Latin script is usually used to write the language. The orthography is more or less similar to the one employed by Tagalog: b, d, f, g, h, k, l, m, n, ng (for /ŋ/), s, t, w, and y (for /j/), though other letters may be used in writing foreign words.

Awed, Underwood & Van Wynen (2004) use a system of diacritics to accommodate the seven vowel phonemes of Tboli. The vowels are: a, i, é (for /ɛ/), e (for /ə/), ó (for /o/), u, and o (for /ɔ/).

The glottal stop /ʔ/ is usually not represented in writing. Though the grave accent ` is used to represent it as in ngà /ŋaʔ/ 'child' and gawì /gawiʔ/ 'serving spoon.' If a vowel already has a diacritic on it, then the circumflex accent ^ is used as in sdô /sdoʔ/ and bê /bɛʔ/ 'don't.'

Awed et al. note that sometimes that the apostrophe may be used to break up an initial consonant cluster as in the name of the language; that is, T'boli instead of simply Tboli. They note that native Tboli speakers have had "a very strong negative reaction" to this convention, preferring instead to write Tboli.
