= Blaan language =

Austronesian language of the southern Philippines

Blaan
- Native to: Philippines
- Region: Mindanao
- Ethnicity: Blaan
- Native speakers: (240,000 cited 2000–2007)
- Language family: Austronesian: Malayo-Polynesian; Philippine; South Mindanao; Blaan

Language codes
- ISO 639-3: Either: bpr – Koronadal Blaan (Tagalagad) bps – Sarangani Blaan (Tumanao)
- Glottolog: blaa1241

Blaan, also known as Bla'an, is an Austronesian language of the southern Philippines spoken by an indigenous ethnic group of the same name who inhabited many areas of Soccksargen and Davao Occidental.

== Classification ==
Blaan belongs to the Bilic microgroup of the Philippine language subgroup, along with Giangan Manobo, Tiruray, and Tboli.

== Distribution ==
There are two major varieties of Blaan: Koronadal Blaan (Tagalagad) and Sarangani Blaan (Tumanao).

According to the Ethnologue, Koronadal Blaan is spoken in:

- eastern South Cotabato Province
- Sarangani Province
- Sultan Kudarat Province (Lutayan area)
- Davao Occidental Province

Sarangani Blaan is spoken in:

- almost the entire area of Sarangani Province
- South Cotabato Province (General Santos and north)
- Davao Occidental Province (language area across from Sarangani Province's northern border)

== Phonology ==
Blaan has fifteen consonant and seven vowel phonemes. Unlike most other Philippine languages and Austronesian languages in general, Blaan (like its related language Tboli) permits a variety of consonant clusters at the onset of a syllable. This is evident in the name of the language, /bla'an/. This contraction of the original schwa sound exists in other Austronesian languages (such as Javanese, a major language of Java in Indonesia), but is rarely seen outside of the Bilic group within the Philippines.

Blaan Consonants
| | | Labial | Alveolar | Palatal | Velar | Glottal |
|---|---|---|---|---|---|---|
| Nasal | | m | n | | ŋ | |
| Plosive | voiceless | | t | | k | ʔ |
| Plosive | voiced | b | d | | ɡ | |
| Fricative | | f | s | | | h |
| Approximant | | w | l | j | | |

Blaan Vowels
| | Front | Central | Back |
|---|---|---|---|
| High | i | | u |
| Mid | ɛ | ə | ɔ |
| Low | a | | ɑ |

/i, ɛ/ are also heard as [ɪ, e]. /ə/ can also be heard as [ɨ, ʌ] within syllables.

== Syntax ==
Blaan uses word order to indicate the thematic roles of nominal elements in the sentence.

Kamfe kuku ungeh.
AV.catch cat rat
'The cat catches the rat'

Similar to other Philippine-type Austronesian languages, Blaan uses verbal morphology to indicate voice (or focus, as it is usually called in the literature). Here are some examples of voice/focus types in Blaan:

Agent voice/focus (-m-)

Magin nga do.
AV.accompany child me
'The child accompanies me.'

Patient voice/focus (-n-)

Nebe libun ale.
PV.bring girl them
'The girl brings them.'

== Vocabulary ==
Sample words
| English | Blaan |
|---|---|
| chicken | anuk |
| flower | bulek |
| horse | kura |
| corn | agul |
| needle | dalum |
| basket | been |
| broom | fune |
| rat | unge |
| money | filak |
| goat | uhe |
| scissors | gunting |
| mat | igem |
| clouds | labun |
| fish | nalaf |
| eye | mata |
| pestle | sung |
| leaf | doon |
| bone | tulan |
| lamp | salo |
| snake | ulad |
| crow | wak |
| foot | bli |
| mother | ye |
| father | ma |
