= Klata language =

Austronesian language spoken in the Philippines

Klata
- Giangan
- Native to: Philippines
- Region: Mindanao
- Native speakers: (55,000 cited 1990 census)
- Language family: Austronesian: Malayo-Polynesian; Philippine?; South Mindanao; Klata

Language codes
- ISO 639-3: bgi
- Glottolog: gian1241

Klata (also known as Clata, Giangan, Bagobo, Jangan) is an Austronesian language of the southern Philippines. It is spoken on the eastern slopes of Mount Apo in Davao del Sur Province, as well as in Davao City (Ethnologue) in an area stretching from Catalunan to Calinan.

The nearby Tagabawa language is also known as Bagobo, and is not to be confused with Giangan.

== Classification ==
Klata is usually classified as one of the South Mindanao languages. Zorc (2019) proposes that it is not included among the South Mindanao languages, but only more distantly related to them within a wider subgroup of the Philippine languages which he calls "Southern Philippine".

== Distribution ==
Traditional Klata (Giangan) population centers included the following barangays (see also Districts of Davao City).

- Biao, Tugbok District, Davao City
- Tagakpan, Tugbok District, Davao City
- Dulian
- Sirib, Calinan District, Davao City
- Gumalang, Baguio District, Davao City
- Tamugan, Marilog District, Davao City

It is also spoken in Biao Joaquin, Calinan District and in various parts of Baguio District.

The Lipadas River separated the traditional Tagabawa and Clata territories, while the Talomo River (Ikawayanlinan) was the boundary separating the Tagabawas, Clatas, and Obos. The Davao River separated the traditional Bagobo and Clata territories.

== Phonology ==
Klata has a five-vowel system consisting of the vowels /a, ɛ, ɔ, i, u/. It also has consonantal geminates. Consonantal phonemes are /p, b, t, d, k, ɡ, ʔ, m, n, ŋ, s, h, l, j, w/. [ɾ] sometimes occurs as phonemic, but is mostly heard as an allophone of /d/.

=== Vowels ===
	Front	Back
Close	i	u
Open-mid	ɛ	ɔ
Open	a	

=== Consonants ===
		Bilabial	Alveolar/Palatal	Velar	Glottal
Plosive	Voiceless	p	t	k	ʔ
Plosive	Voiced	b	d	ɡ	
Nasal		m	n	ŋ	
Fricative/Tap		s	ɾ		h
Lateral approximant			l		
Approximant		w	j	(w)	
