= Teduray language =

Austronesian language spoken in the Philippines

Teduray
- Tiruray
- Native to: Philippines
- Region: Mindanao
- Ethnicity: Teduray people
- Native speakers: 50,000 (2002)
- Language family: Austronesian: Malayo-Polynesian; Philippine; South Mindanao; Teduray

Language codes
- ISO 639-3: tiy
- Glottolog: tiru1241

Teduray or Tiruray is an Austronesian language of the southern Philippines spoken by the Teduray people, in the Datu Blah T. Sinsuat and Upi municipalities (southern Maguindanao del Norte Province), South Upi municipality (western Maguindanao del Sur Province), and Lebak municipality (northwestern Sultan Kudarat Province).

== History ==
In 1892, P. Guillermo Bennásar published a Spanish–Tiruray dictionary.

== Phonology ==
Two features set the Teduray language apart from other Austronesian languages of the area. The first is a six-vowel system, and the second is the lack of a bilabial stop, but the presence of a bilabial fricative in its place.

=== Consonants ===
Teduray consonants
| | | Bilabial | Alveolar | Palatal | Velar | Glottal |
|---|---|---|---|---|---|---|
| Nasal | | m | n | | ŋ | |
| Stop | Voiceless | | t | | k | ʔ |
| Stop | Voiced | b | d | | g | |
| Fricative | | ɸ | s | | | h |
| Lateral | | | l | | | |
| Trill | | | r ~ ɾ | | | |
| Glide | | w | | j | | |

=== Vowels ===
The Teduray language has six vowel phonemes. These are split into three categories: front vowels, middle vowels, and back vowels.

Teduray vowels
| | Front | Mid | Back |
|---|---|---|---|
| High | i | ɨ | u |
| Mid | e | | o |
| Low | | a | |

The vowels /a, i, e/ have allophones used before the /t, k/, voiced stops, nasals, /l/, and /r/ in closed syllables.

=== Syllables ===
Teduray does not allow vowel sequences. The syllable structure is CVC or CV. The majority of word bases in Teduray have two syllables, but stems may have from one to five syllables. Adding affixes, a word can consist of as many as eight syllables.

There is no restriction on consonants used in a word as long as the word follows the CVC or CV structure. However, the letters /w/ and /y/ never follow after /i/, and the same rule applies to /w/ after /u/.

=== Stress ===
The primary word stress is placed on the ante-penultimate (third from the last syllable) or the penultimate (second to the last syllable) of a word with four syllables or more. Secondary stress is present on polysyllabic words, preceding the primary stress by two syllables. Stress is non-contrastive and non-phonetic.

== Morphology ==
=== Nouns ===
Singular nouns are followed by é and plural nouns are preceded by de instead. This is exemplified below:

Mitem i rawen é.
black ?? cloud N.SG
'The cloud is black.'

Mitem i de rawen.
black ?? N.PL cloud
'The clouds are black.'

=== Verbs ===
The Teduray verbs consist of an affix and verb base. Verbs are split into three categories numbered 1, 2, and 3.

Verbs that are accepted in a case frame having an objective actant are classed as verb 1. An example of this is the following:

Menley u beˀ sabon
bought I ?? soap
'I bought soap.'

Verbs of type Verb 2 do not require an objective actant in the case frame. An example of Verb 2 is the following:

Lementu u.
run I
'I am running.'

Verb 3 refers to the verbs that accept affixes and are verbalized. Verb 3 is divided into Verb 3a and 3b. Verb 3a are those verbalized nouns that do not need any agent actant. Examples of such nouns are ranaˀ 'rain' and lubaˀ 'earthquake'. Verbs that accept affirmation aside from those mentioned above are Verb 3b, and they can occur with actants. Examples of the type Verb 3 are enintura 'painted', derived from the noun root fintura 'paint', and melansa 'ironing', derived from the noun root felansa 'flat iron'.

== Actant ==
An actant is any constituent which can enter a case relationship with the verb. Teduray distinguishes six types of actants: agent, object, dative, benefactive, instrument, and locative.

=== Agent ===
The agent is the source responsible for the action identified by the verb or the perceived instigator of the action identified by the verb.

Basae i Rosa é i libro é
read ?? Rosa N.SG ?? book N.SG
'Rosa reads the book.'

=== Object ===
The object refers to the things or persons affected by the action or state identified by the verb.

Menuwit i Maria é beˀ kaˀan é ˀeŋaˀ.
brought ?? Maria N.SG her child N.SG ??
'Maria brought her child.'

=== Benefactive ===
This is the case of the animate being for whom an action chosen by the verb is carried out, or the case of the animate being for whom an object specified in the proposition is intended or reserved.

Menley u safiyu fara ka Marina é.
bought I hat for ?? Marina N.SG
'I bought a hat for Marina.'

=== Locative ===
The locative indicates the spatial orientation of the action or state identified by the verb.

Semayaw i ˀeŋaˀ é dob beˀ ˀiroˀo mo é.
jump ?? child N.SG ?? ?? bed your N.SG
'The child is jumping in your bed.'

=== Dative ===
This is the case of the animate being directly affected by the action or the state identified by the verb.

Semulat i Linda é dob beˀ ˀideŋ no é beˀ bayuk.
write ?? Linda N.SG ?? ?? mother her N.SG ?? poem
'Linda writes her mother a poem.'

=== Instrument ===
This marks the actant which expresses the object or being which is used as an instrument or means in carrying out the action or state identified by the verb.

Benaˀus ku i ˀeŋaˀ é beˀ mot é.
wrapped I ?? child N.SG ?? blanket N.SG
'I wrapped the child with the blanket.'

== Syntax ==
=== Word order ===
In the basic word order the predicate followed by the series of NPs. The agentive or objective actant follows immediately after the predicate. When the agent is the topic, the agentive and objective actants may be changed without causing any semantic change.

[Miber] [i ˀeŋaˀ é] [beˀ batew é].
[throw] [?? child N.SG] [?? stone N.SG]
'The child throws the stone.'

[Miber] [beˀ batew é] [i ˀeŋaˀ é].
Throw [?? stone N.SG] [?? child N.SG]
'The child throws the stone.'

Both of these forms are grammatical provided this sentence and subject matter. In all other cases, any topicalized actant follows the agent.

== Loanwords ==
The Teduray people have adopted words from different places and though not all have been confirmed, according to the Teduray speakers themselves the sources of the loans are Maguindanaon, Chinese, English, Hiligaynon, Spanish, and Tagalog. These are the confirmed languages as given by the opinions of the Teduray speakers. One language not listed as a source is Sanskrit through Maguindanaon, but suggested lexical items are perceived as native words by the speakers. Although some words are also borrowed from Arabic, these entered through Maguindanaon.
