= 2017 in the Philippines =

- Decades: 1990s; 2000s; 2010s; 2020s
- See also: List of years in the Philippines; films; music; television; sports

2017 in the Philippines details events of note that happened in the Philippines in 2017.

2017 was designated as Visit ASEAN Year 2017.

== Incumbents ==
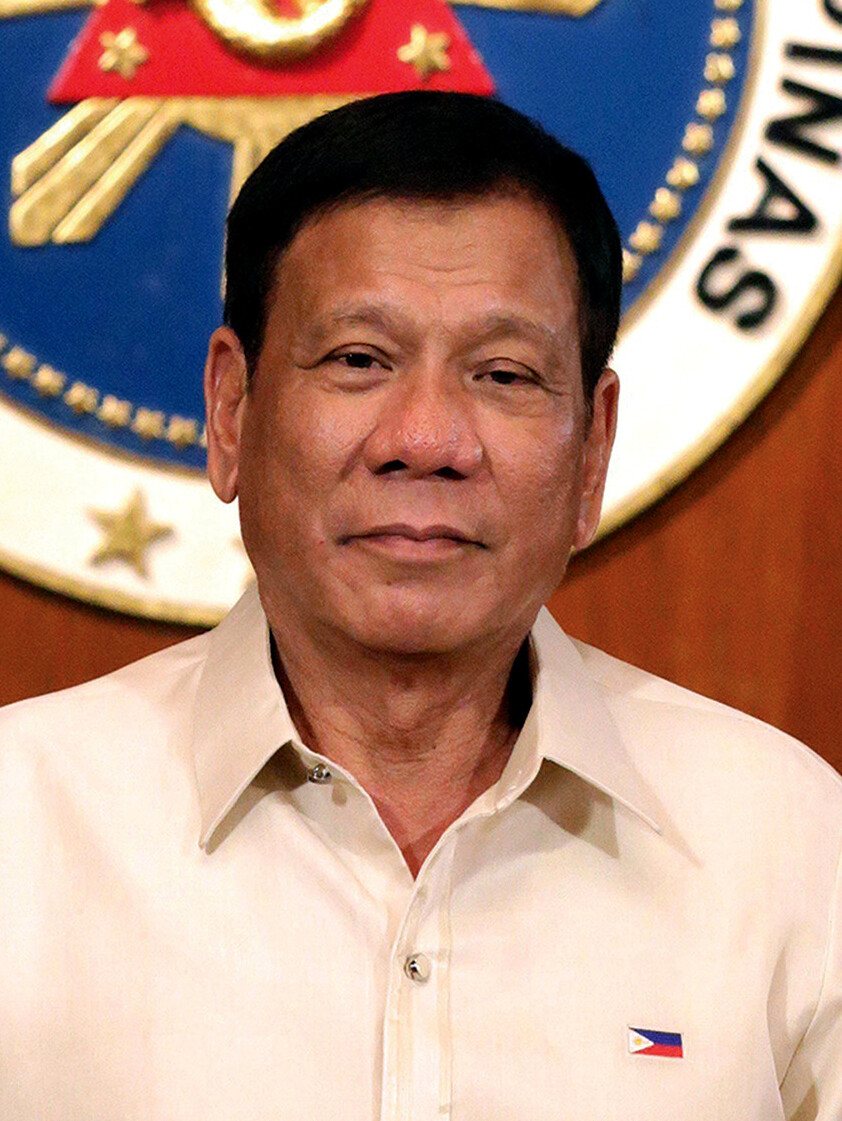
Rodrigo R.
Duterte

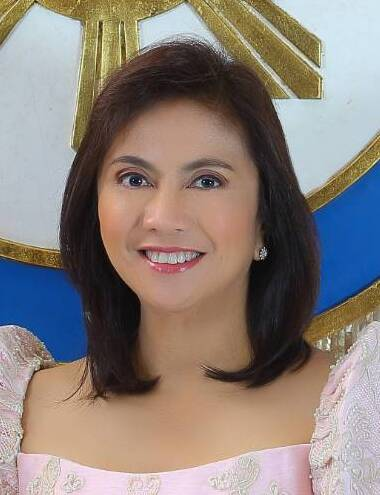
Leni G.
Robredo

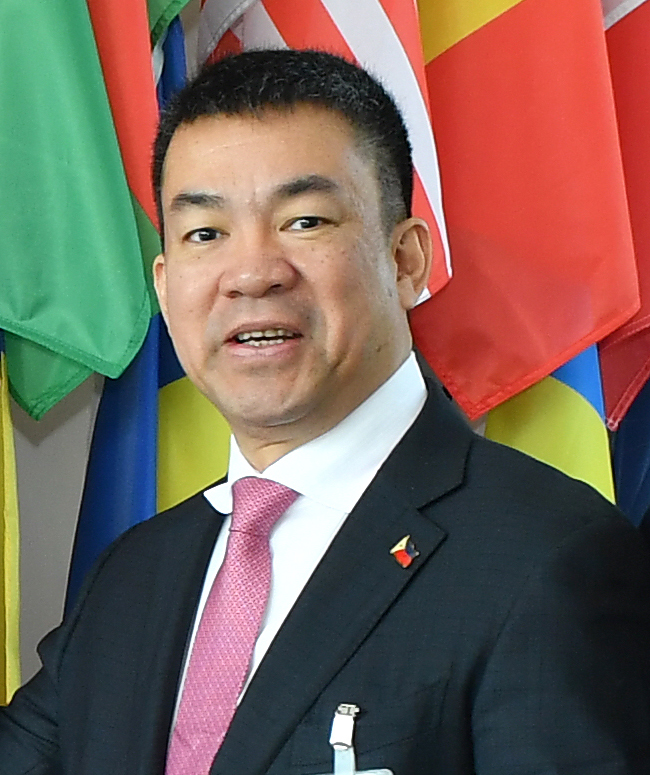
Aquilino M.
Pimentel III

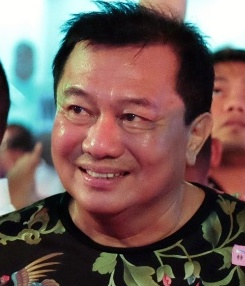
Pantaleon D.
Alvarez

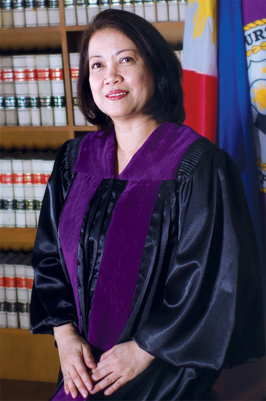
Maria Lourdes
P.A. Sereno

- President: Rodrigo Duterte (PDP–Laban)
- Vice President: Leni Robredo (Liberal)
- Congress (17th):
  - Senate President: Aquilino Pimentel III (PDP–Laban)
  - House Speaker: Pantaleon Alvarez (PDP–Laban)
- Chief Justice: Maria Lourdes Sereno

== Events ==
=== January ===
- January 1 – Four members of the Bangsamoro Islamic Freedom Fighters are killed and four others were wounded in a clash with government soldiers in Datu Salibo, Maguindanao.
- January 4 – About a hundred armed men of unknown affiliation, launch an attack on a prison in Kidapawan, freeing at least 158 inmates in what is reported as the biggest jailbreak in the history of Cotabato.
- January 5 – Mohammad Jaafar Maguid, the leader of the Ansar Khalifa Philippines which is allegedly affiliated with the Islamic State, is killed by government forces in Sarangani.
- January 11:
  - President Duterte signs an executive order mandating universal access to modern family planning tools.
  - President Duterte orders the unwarranted arrest and deportation of Indian nationals, especially Punjabis, involved in the 5–6 money lending scheme.
- January 16–20 – The 4th World Apostolic Congress on Mercy commences with a Mass at the Manila Cathedral. Other events are held in Manila, Batangas, Bulacan, and Bataan.
- January 17:
  - The city government of Cagayan de Oro declares a state of calamity in response to flooding caused by heavy rainfall brought by a low pressure area in the vicinity of Kabasalan, Zamboanga Sibugay and the tail-end of a cold front.
  - The National Bureau of Investigation confirms the death of Jee Ick-Joo, a South Korean entrepreneur who was abducted in Angeles City on October 18, 2016.
- January 30 – President Duterte orders the cleansing of the Philippine National Police (PNP) after corruption was discovered in the wake of the kidnapping of Jee Ick-Joo.

=== February ===
- February 1 – The Communist Party of the Philippines (CPP) and the New People's Army (NPA) end their unilateral ceasefire with the Philippine government.
- February 10 – A 6.7 magnitude earthquake hits Surigao del Norte, killing at least four people.
- February 14:
  - The PNP declares a "war on illegal gambling", following its withdrawal on the war on drugs.
  - Department of Environment and Natural Resources secretary Gina Lopez orders the closure of 75 mines for violations of environmental laws.
- February 21 – A tour bus carrying college students bound for a camping site in Tanay, Rizal, loses control of its brakes and crashes into a roadside electricity pole, killing 15 and injuring 40 on board. The accident uncovers lax regulations on safety of students on educational trips in the country and prompts the Commission on Higher Education (CHED) and the Department of Education (DepEd) to issue moratoriums on field trips for the 2016–17 school year.
- February 24 – Senator Leila de Lima is arrested for alleged violations of Republic Act 9165, or the Comprehensive Dangerous Drugs Act of 2002, related to her alleged involvement in the New Bilibid Prison drug trafficking scandal.
- February 27 – Jeepney drivers, mostly belonging to the transport groups PISTON and Stop and Go Coalition, lead a nationwide strike against the planned modernization of jeepneys, that causes class suspensions and strands passengers at major metropolitan areas nationwide.
- February 28 – President Duterte signs the Paris Agreement on Climate Change.

=== March ===
- March 1 – After a temporary suspension of the war on drugs due to the kidnapping and killing of Jee Ick-Joo, president Duterte orders the PNP to resume his controversial campaign.
- March 2 – Angel Manalo, brother of Iglesia ni Cristo (INC) Executive Minister Eduardo Manalo, and 31 others are arrested for illegal possession of firearms for an alleged shooting incident at Manalo's compound in Quezon City.
- March 9 – Members of Kadamay (Kalipunan ng Damayan Mahihirap) occupy 4,000 houses inside government housing projects in Pandi and San Jose del Monte in Bulacan.
- March 15 – Magdalo representative Gary Alejano files the first impeachment complaint against president Duterte alleging culpability in the extrajudicial killings in the war on drugs.

=== April ===
- April 4:
  - President Duterte orders the resignation of Department of the Interior and Local Government secretary Ismael Sueño amid corruption allegations.
  - A magnitude 5.5 earthquake occurs northwest of Tingloy, Batangas, causing damage to buildings. The province soon declared a state of calamity after the quake.
- April 11 – A clash between the Armed Forces of the Philippines, the PNP Special Action Force and Abu Sayyaf in Inabanga, Bohol kills six, including the notorious Muammar Askali, also known as "Abu Rami".
- April 17 – A bus traveling from Isabela to Ilocos Sur falls off a ravine in Carranglan, Nueva Ecija, killing 31 on board. The accident, resulting from poor vehicle maintenance, is one of the most deadliest road accidents in the Philippines.
- April 26–29 – The 30th ASEAN Summit is held at the Philippine International Convention Center in Pasay.
- April 27 – The PNP discovers a secret jail cell inside a Manila Police District precinct, that raised possibilities of police abuses in the war on drugs.
- April 28 – The bombings take place in the district of Quiapo in Manila.

=== May ===
- May 5 – United Nations special rapporteur Agnes Callamard takes part in a drug policy forum in the University of the Philippines. The Philippine government says it would file a complaint with the UN regarding the visit.
- May 15 – The majority of the House of Representatives justice committee rejects the impeachment complaint filed by Magdalo representative Gary Alejano against president Duterte for lack of substance.
- May 16:
  - President Duterte signs Executive Order No. 25, that renames Benham Rise to Philippine Rise.
  - President Duterte signs Executive Order No. 26 declaring a nationwide smoking ban.
- May 18:
  - Implementation of Republic Act No. 10913, or the "Anti-Distracted Driving Act", is started.
  - Ferdinand Marcelino, along with his Chinese informant, Yan Yi Shou, are released after their drug-related case is dropped.
- May 19 – Implementation of Republic Act No. 10666, or the "Children on Motorcycle Safety Act of 2015", is started.
- May 23 – President Duterte signs Proclamation No. 216 declaring a 60-day martial law in Mindanao following clashes between government forces and the Maute group in Marawi.

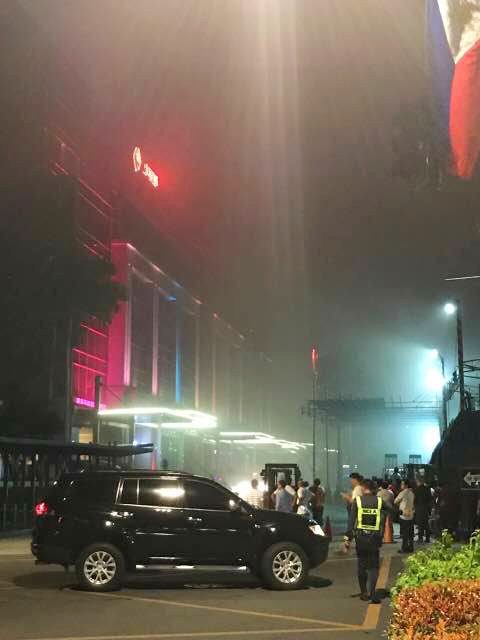
Resorts World Manila immediately following the shooting. The complex was shrouded in smoke from fires started by the suspect. Also picture is Maxims Tower, where the attacker committed suicide.

=== June ===
- June 1 – Defense Secretary Delfin Lorenzana announces the deaths of ten soldiers in Marawi as a result of a "friendly fire" airstrike.
- June 2 – A gunman attacks Resorts World Manila in Pasay around midnight, caused a major panic within the complex. Around 38 people die due to smoke inhalation from the fire while 70 others are injured.
- June 4:
  - In Marawi, a ceasefire organised by the Moro Islamic Liberation Front is broken, leaving locals hungry for nearly two weeks.
  - The PNP identifies the attacker at Resorts World Manila as Jessie Javier Carlos, an ex-employee of the Department of Finance who was deeply in debt.

=== July ===
- July 6:
  - A 6.5 magnitude earthquake hits Leyte, causing at least four deaths and 100 injuries. The quake also causes power interruptions in the whole of Eastern Visayas and nearby Bohol.
  - The Supreme Court says President Duterte can declare martial law in the whole Philippines. Two days prior, the Supreme Court had ruled in favor of the constitutionality of Proclamation No. 216 which declared Martial Law and suspended the privilege of the writ of habeas corpus in the whole of Mindanao, in response to the Marawi crisis.
- July 22 – In a special joint session requested by President Duterte, Congress votes 261–18 to extend the martial law in Mindanao until December 31, 2017.
- July 23 – The nationwide ban on public smoking is implemented.
- July 30 – Sixteen people, including Mayor Reynaldo Parojinog Sr. and his wife, are killed in a police drug raid in Ozamiz, Misamis Occidental. The Parojinog family had been previously identified with their ties to the illegal drug trade, as well as the organized crime group Kuratong Baleleng.

=== August ===
- August 8 – The Supreme Court junks all petitions against the burial of former president Ferdinand Marcos at the Libingan ng mga Bayani, re-affirming its earlier ruling on November 8, 2016.
- August 9 – President Duterte abolishes the Negros Island Region (first created in 2015 by his predecessor Benigno Aquino III) through Executive Order no. 38, citing lack of funds to fully establish the region. Negros Occidental reverts to the Western Visayas region, while Negros Oriental reverts back to the Central Visayas region.
- August 11 – The Department of Agriculture confirms an avian influenza outbreak in Pampanga.
- August 16 – 17-year-old Kian Loyd delos Santos is fatally shot by police officers conducting an anti-drug operation in Caloocan. The case becomes controversial when official police reports are contradicted by witness accounts and CCTV footage. This causes thousands to protest on EDSA heeding calls from the Catholic Church to criticize the drug war and the Senate to investigate the killing. Hundreds attend his funeral on August 26.
- August 20 – The Court of Appeals of the Philippines junks U.S. Marine Joseph Scott Pemberton's motion for reconsideration, re-affirming its decision in April 2016 upholding the 2015 homicide ruling of the Olongapo City Regional Trial Court; citing the defendant's arguments as mere "rehash of issues". The Court of Appeals also upheld the payment of ₱ 4.32 million to Jennifer Laude's family for "loss of earning capacity". Pemberton faces 10 years in prison.

=== September ===
- September 7 – The Senate investigates Paolo Duterte, the son of President Duterte, in an alleged methamphetamine smuggling scandal.
- September 12 – The House of Representatives approves a bill that limits the budget of the Commission on Human Rights to only ₱1,000 (US$20).
- September 14 – The Makabayan bloc leaves the majority of the House of Representatives over disagreements due to the ongoing drug war.
- September 15 – Around 1,200 PNP personnel in Caloocan are fired over allegations of abuse.
- September 21 – Coinciding with the 45th anniversary of the declaration of martial law in 1972 by former President and dictator Ferdinand Marcos, nationwide protests – also known as "National Day of Protest" — are conducted by various groups against the government's implementation of war on drugs and the ongoing martial law in Mindanao under the Duterte administration.

=== October ===
- October 16–17 – The ringleaders of the attack on Marawi, Isnilon Hapilon of Abu Sayyaf and Omar Maute of the Maute Group, are reportedly killed by government forces on October 16 during a hostage rescue operation, according to Defense Secretary Delfin Lorenzana. The following day President Duterte declares the liberation of Marawi.
- October 23 – The Battle of Marawi is declared officially over by the AFP.

=== November ===
- November 5 – Dubbed as "Lord, Heal Our Land", led by Lingayen-Dagupan Archbishop Socrates Villegas, about thousands of mourners of extrajudicial killing victims attend a mass held at the EDSA Shrine.
- November 10–12 – The Philippines hosts the 31st ASEAN Summit at the Clark Freeport Zone in Angeles City.
- November 13–14 – The Philippines hosts the Twelfth East Asia Summit at the Clark Freeport Zone.

=== December ===
- December 19 – President Duterte signs the Tax Reform for Acceleration and Inclusion Law (TRAIN Law).
- December 21 – A ferry sinks off the coast of Luzon with 251 passengers on board. At least five people are reported to have died.
- December 23:
  - More than 200 people die in the southern Philippines as a result of floods and mudslides caused by Severe Tropical Storm Vinta.
  - A fire breaks out at NCCC Mall in Davao City at around 9:30 a.m. PST (UTC+8), leaving 38 people dead, mostly employees of the market research firm Survey Sampling International (SSI). The probable cause of the fire is faulty electrical wiring due to malpractice of the renovation of the mall's third floor.
- December 28 – In Mandaluyong, police officers mistakenly fire at a vehicle, which they thought carried suspects in a previous shooting incident, leaving two people dead and two others injured. As a result, 10 police officers are relieved from their positions.

== Holidays ==
On August 18, 2016, the government announced at least 19 Philippine holidays for 2017 as declared by virtue of Proclamation No. 50, series of 2016. Note that in the list, holidays in italics are "special non-working holidays," those in bold are "regular holidays," and those in non-italics and non-bold are "special holidays for schools."

In addition, several other places observe local holidays, such as the foundation of their town. These are also "special days."

- January 1 – **New Year's Day**
- January 2 – Special non-working holiday (in observance of the New Year's Day celebration)
- January 28 – Chinese New Year
- February 25 – 1986 EDSA Revolution
- April 9 – **Araw ng Kagitingan** (Day of Valor)
- April 13 – **Maundy Thursday**
- April 14 – **Good Friday**
- April 15 – Black Saturday
- May 1 – **Labor Day**
- June 12 – **Independence Day**
- June 26 – Eid'l Fitr (Feast of Ramadan)
- August 21 – Ninoy Aquino Day
- August 28 – **National Heroes Day**
- September 1 – Eid'l Adha (Feast of Sacrifice)
- October 31 – Special non-working holiday
- November 1 – All Saints Day
- November 30 – **Bonifacio Day**
- December 25 – **Christmas Day**
- December 30 – **Rizal Day**
- December 31 – Last day of the year (in observance of New Year's celebrations)

== Business and economy ==
- August 22 – Viacom International Media Networks has announced it will no longer pursue a Nickelodeon underwater theme park and resort in Palawan, Philippines. The project, announced last January, attracted controversy due to criticisms from environmentalist groups who fear the resort might destroy the area's marine ecosystem, home to two UNESCO World Heritage sites.

== Health ==
- August 11 – Cases of H5N6 in poultry farms in Pampanga were detected; this was the first time the avian virus was detected in the country.
- December 1 – The Department of Health (DOH) temporarily suspends a school-based dengue vaccination program after Dengvaxia vaccine maker Sanofi Pasteur made a statement that its product poses higher risks to people without prior dengue infection.

== Sports ==
=== May ===
- May 6, Football – The first match of the inaugural season of the Philippines Football League, the country's first nationwide professional football league was played.
- May 12–18, Basketball – Quezon City hosted the 2017 SEABA Championship.

=== August ===
- August 1–7, Boxing – The Asian Junior Boxing Championship was hosted in Puerto Princesa, Palawan.
- August 9–17, Volleyball – Metro Manila hosted the 2017 Asian Women's Volleyball Championship.
- August 19–30 – The Philippines competed at the 29th Southeast Asian Games held in Kuala Lumpur, Malaysia. The Philippines finished the 29th SEA Games in 6th place with a medal haul of 24 Golds, 33 Silvers and 64 Bronze which is the country's worst finish in 18 years. The next edition of the Southeast Asian Games will be hosted by the Philippines in 2019.

=== October ===
- October 13 – TV5 Network Inc. re-brands its sporting division to ESPN 5 as part of a partnership with The Walt Disney Company and Hearst Corporation, the co-owners of ESPN Inc.; the re-branding was held to coinciding with the start of the 2017 PBA Governors' Cup Finals. Prior to the TV5-ESPN partnership, the ESPN branding was formerly used by Fox Networks Group Asia before re-branded to Fox Sports Asia in 2014.

== Entertainment and culture ==
=== January ===
- January 9:
  - President Duterte issues Proclamation No. 124 declaring the month of January as the National Bible Month.
  - President Duterte declares Yabing Masalon Dulo, Ambalang Ausalin, and Estelita Tumandan Bantilan, the three female Mindanaoan weavers as National Living Treasures for 2016.
- January 30 – The coronation event of the Miss Universe 2016 pageant takes place at the Mall of Asia Arena in Pasay. It is the third time that the Philippines hosted the event. Iris Mittenaere of France was crowned as Miss Universe 2016.

=== March ===
- March 5 – Maymay Entrata of Cagayan de Oro is hailed as the Big Winner of Pinoy Big Brother Lucky Season 7.
- March 11 – Noven Belleza of Victorias, Negros Occidental is hailed as It's Showtime's Tawag ng Tanghalan Grand Champion.
- March 31 – Michelle Arceo of Mandaluyong is crowned as the first ever Gandang Filipina of Wowowin.

=== April ===
- April 30 – Rachel Peters, a Filipino-British model, is crowned as Miss Universe Philippines 2017 during the coronation night of the Binibining Pilipinas 2017 at the Smart Araneta Coliseum in Quezon City.

=== May ===
- May 27 – JC Teves, Debbie Then, Kim Cruz and Arturo Daza are named as the four new myx VJs at the end of MYX VJ Search 2017.
- May 30 – Angela Lehmann from Bicol was declared as the grand winner of Philippines' Next Top Model: High Street competition.

=== June ===
- June 4 – Wacky Kiray is crowned as the first Greatest Entertainer of I Can Do That!
- June 28 – Maureen Wroblewitz, representing the Philippines, is declared as the grand winner of Asia's Next Top Model (cycle 5).

=== July ===
- July 15 – Karen Ibasco, is crowned as Miss Philippines Earth 2017 during the coronation night at the Mall of Asia Arena, Pasay, Philippines
- July 30 – Jona Soquite of Davao City wins as the first The Voice Teens grand champion.

=== August ===
- August 25–27 – The third edition of Asia Pop Comic Convention is held with international stars Ray Fisher, Tyler Hoechlin, Joe Keery, Noah Schnapp, Dacre Montgomery and Sadie Sink serving as guests.

=== September ===
- September 3 – Former UAAP Courtside Reporter Laura Victoria Lehmann is crowned as the Miss World Philippines 2017 on the Coronation night held at the Mall of Asia Arena in Pasay. She will represent the Philippines at Miss World 2017 pageant to be held in China.

=== November ===
- November 4 – Karen Ibasco, is crowned Miss Earth 2017 held at the Mall of Asia Arena, Pasay.
- November 5 – Wynwyn Marquez is crowned as Reina Hispanoamericana-Filipinas 2017 Held in Santa Cruz, Bolivia.
- November 26 – Miss Philippines Rachel Peters is placed in the Top 10 of the Miss Universe 2017 pageant held in Las Vegas, Nevada, USA.

== Deaths ==
January

- January 1 – Mel Lopez, former Mayor of Manila (1986–92) and Philippine Sports Commission chairman (1993–96) (born 1935)
- January 30 – Cesar C. Raval, Roman Catholic prelate, Bishop of Bangued (born 1924)

February

- February 6 – Boy Asistio, former Mayor of Caloocan (1980–86, 1988–95) (born 1936)
- February 9 – Rev. Fr. Erick Santos, preacher of Kerygma TV and former host of Family Rosary Crusade (born 1962)-->
- February 12 – Herminio Bautista, comedian, director, and former Quezon City councilor (born 1934)
- February 28 – Simeon Datumanong, former congressman of Maguindanao and former cabinet member (born 1935)

March

- March 20 – Leticia Ramos-Shahani, former senator (born 1929)
- March 23 – Alex Tizon, author and Pulitzer Prize-winning journalist (born 1959)

April

- April 15 – Alfonso Yuchengco, prominent industrialist, certified public accountant, educator, and diplomat (born 1923)

May

- May 2 – Romeo Vasquez, actor (born 1939)
- May 24 – Gil Portes, film director (born 1945)
- May 25 – Eva Estrada Kalaw, former senator (born 1920)

June

- June 10 – Malang, artist (born 1928)
- June 17:
  - Rodolfo Fontiveros Beltran, Roman Catholic prelate and Vicar Apostolic of Bontoc-Lagawe and Bishop of San Fernando de La Union (born 1948)
  - Leopoldo S. Tumulak, Roman Catholic prelate, Bishop of Tagbilaran and Military Ordinary of the Philippines (born 1944)
- June 30 – Jake Tordesillas, screenwriter (born 1948)

July

- July 21 – Soxie Topacio, film director and LGBT activist (Quezon City Pride Council) (born 1952)

August

- August 1 – Alfie Lorenzo, talent manager (born 1939)
- August 6 – Ramon N. Villegas, curator, essayist, art historian, collector, jeweler and poet (born 1953).
- August 8 – Zeny Zabala, actress (born 1937)
- August 24 – Amelyn Veloso, news anchor. (born 1974)

September

- September 4 – David Consunji, chairman emeritus of DMCI Holdings (born 1921)
- September 17:
  - Cris Bolado, basketball player (Alaska Milkmen) (born 1969)
  - Horacio Castillo III, UST Law Student called Hazing Victim
- September 23:
  - Loreto Carbonell, basketball player (born 1933)
  - Ric Manrique Jr., singer (born 1947)
- September 26 – Dominador Aytona, politician, Senator (born 1918)
- September 30 – Joe Taruc, radio broadcaster (born 1947)

October

- October 7 – Washington SyCip, accountant, founder of the Asian Institute of Management and SGV & Company (born 1921)
- October 8 – Henedina Abad, politician, member of the House of Representatives of the Philippines for Batanes (born 1955)
- October 9 – Tony Calvento, veteran journalist (born 1954)
- October 11 – Emmanuel Borlaza, film director (born 1935)
- October 14 – Lourdes Quisumbing, former Secretary of Education, Culture and Sports (born 1921)
- October 15 – Chinggoy Alonzo, actor
- October 16:
  - Isnilon Hapilon, Islamist militant (MNLF, Al-Qaeda, Abu Sayyaf) (born 1966)
  - Omar Maute, Islamist militant (Maute group).
- October 18 – Ricardo Vidal, Roman Catholic prelate and cardinal, Archbishop of Lipa, Cebu and President of the Catholic Bishops' Conference of the Philippines (born 1931)
- October 21 – Juan de Dios Pueblos, Roman Catholic prelate, Bishop of Kidapawan and Butuan (born 1943)
- October 22 – Baldo Marro, actor and director (born 1948)

November

- November 4 – Isabel Granada, actress and singer (born 1976)
- November 11 – Franco Hernandez, television personality. (It's Showtime) and singer, (born 1991)
- November 19 – Elias Tolentino, basketball player, (born 1942)
- November 26 – Christian Vicente Noel, Roman Catholic prelate, Bishop of Talibon (born 1937)

December

- December 5 – Elenito Galido, Roman Catholic prelate, Bishop of Iligan (born 1954)
- December 8 – Flerida Ruth Pineda-Romero, judge and former Associate Justice of the Supreme Court of the Philippines (born 1929)
- December 21 – Mona Sulaiman, olympic sprinter (born 1942)

== See also ==
- List of years in the Philippines
- Timeline of Philippine history
