= Lorenzo Ruiz (disambiguation) =

Lorenzo Ruiz (1594–1637) was a Chinese Filipino martyr.

Lorenzo Ruiz may also refer to:

== Places and things named after Lorenzo Ruiz ==
=== In the Philippines ===
==== Places ====
- San Lorenzo Ruiz, Camarines Norte
- Barangay San Lorenzo, Makati
- Barangay San Lorenzo Zone III, Sogod, Southern Leyte
- Barangay San Lorenzo Ruiz I and II, Dasmariñas
- San Lorenzo Village Puan, Davao City

=== Churches ===
- Minor Basilica of San Lorenzo Ruiz, Binondo, Manila
- San Lorenzo Ruiz Parish, Bacoor, Cavite
- San Lorenzo Ruiz Parish, Mabalacat
- San Lorenzo Ruiz Diocesan Church, Bayugan
- San Lorenzo Ruiz Parish, Taytay, Rizal
- San Lorenzo Ruiz Chapel, Imnajbu, Batanes
- San Lorenzo Ruiz Chapel, Balanga
- San Lorenzo Ruiz Church, Ozamiz City, Misamis Occidental
- San Lorenzo Ruiz Parish, Tandang Sora, Quezon City
- San Lorenzo Ruiz Chapel, Laurel, Batangas
- San Lorenzo Ruiz Parish, Tisa, Cebu City
- San Lorenzo Ruiz de Manila Parish Church, San Jose del Monte, Bulacan
- Saint Lorenzo Ruiz Shrine Bangued, Abra
- San Lorenzo Ruiz and Companion Martyrs Parish, Kaunlaran Village, Navotas
- San Lorenzo Ruiz Parish – Talomo, Davao City
- San Lorenzo Ruiz Parish – Dagatan, Taysan, Batangas
- San Lorenzo Ruiz Parish – Masipit, Calapan
- San Lorenzo Ruiz Church, Gusa, Cagayan de Oro
- San Lorenzo Ruiz Parish – Pinagpanaan Talavera, Nueva Ecija,
- San Lorenzo Ruiz Parish – San Pedro, Laguna
- San Lorenzo Ruiz Parish – Santa Rosa, Laguna
- San Lorenzo Ruiz Church – Rainbow Village, Bagumbong, Caloocan
- San Lorenzo Ruiz Parish – Pag-asa, Kalalake, Olongapo
- San Lorenzo Ruiz de Manila Parish – Polo, Mauban, Quezon

=== Educational institutions ===
- Lorenzo Ruiz Academy, Binondo, Manila
- Colegio de San Lorenzo, a Catholic college in Quezon City, founded in 1988
- Escuela de San Lorenzo Ruiz – Parañaque, Sucat, Parañaque, founded in 1988
- Lorenzo Ruiz de Manila School, Cainta, Rizal, founded in 1990
- San Lorenzo Ruiz de Manila School, Marikina, founded in 2003
- San Lorenzo Ruiz Montessori, Inc., Bulakan, Bulacan
- Colegio San Lorenzo Ruiz de Pilipinas, Paniqui, Tarlac
- San Lorenzo School, a non-sectarian school in San Pedro, Laguna
- San Lorenzo Ruiz Parochial School, Navotas
- San Lorenzo Ruiz Academy of Polomolok
- Colegio de San Lorenzo Ruiz de Manila Inc, of Catarman, Northern Samar
- Lorenzo Mission Institute, Makati
- San Lorenzo Ruiz Center of Studies and Schools, Inc., San Fernando, Pampanga

==== Other ====
- Plaza San Lorenzo Ruiz, the present name of the plaza fronting Binondo Church, Manila
- San Lorenzo Ruiz Diocesan Academy Inc. – San Bartolome, San Leonardo, Nueva Ecija founded in 1989
- San Lorenzo Ruiz Hospital – Naic, Cavite (formerly "The First Filipino Saint Hospital")
- San Lorenzo Ruiz General Hospital – medical clinic located at Malabon, Philippines
- San Lorenzo Ruiz Bridge, Bagabag, Nueva Vizcaya

=== Elsewhere ===
==== Churches ====
- Chapel Of St. Lorenzo Ruiz, New York City, New York, United States
- St. Lorenzo Ruiz Catholic Church, a Catholic church in Walnut, California, United States
- Saint Lorenzo Ruiz Chapel, Bjørnevatn, Vatsø, Norway
- Saint Lorenzo Ruiz Church (Parish), Yomitan, Okinawa Prefecture, Japan

==== Educational institutions ====
- San Lorenzo Ruiz Elementary School, a Catholic school in Mississauga, Ontario, Canada
- San Lorenzo Ruiz Elementary School, a Catholic school in Markham, Ontario, Canada
- St Lorenzo Ruiz Elementary School, a Catholic school in Saskatoon, Saskatchewan, Canada

==== Other ====
- San Lorenzo Ruiz de Manila Community Center in Sugar Land, Texas, United States
