= Estelita (given name) =

Estelita is a feminine given name. Notable people with the name include:

- Estelita Bantilan (born 1940), Filipino textile weaver
- Lily Estelita Liana (born 1993), Indonesian ambassador and beauty pageant titleholder
- Estelita Rodriguez (1928–1966), Cuban actress

== See also ==
- Estelito Mendoza (1930–2025), Filipino lawyer, politician and solicitor general
