= 2017 Central Luzon H5N6 outbreak =

Bird flu outbreak in the Philippines

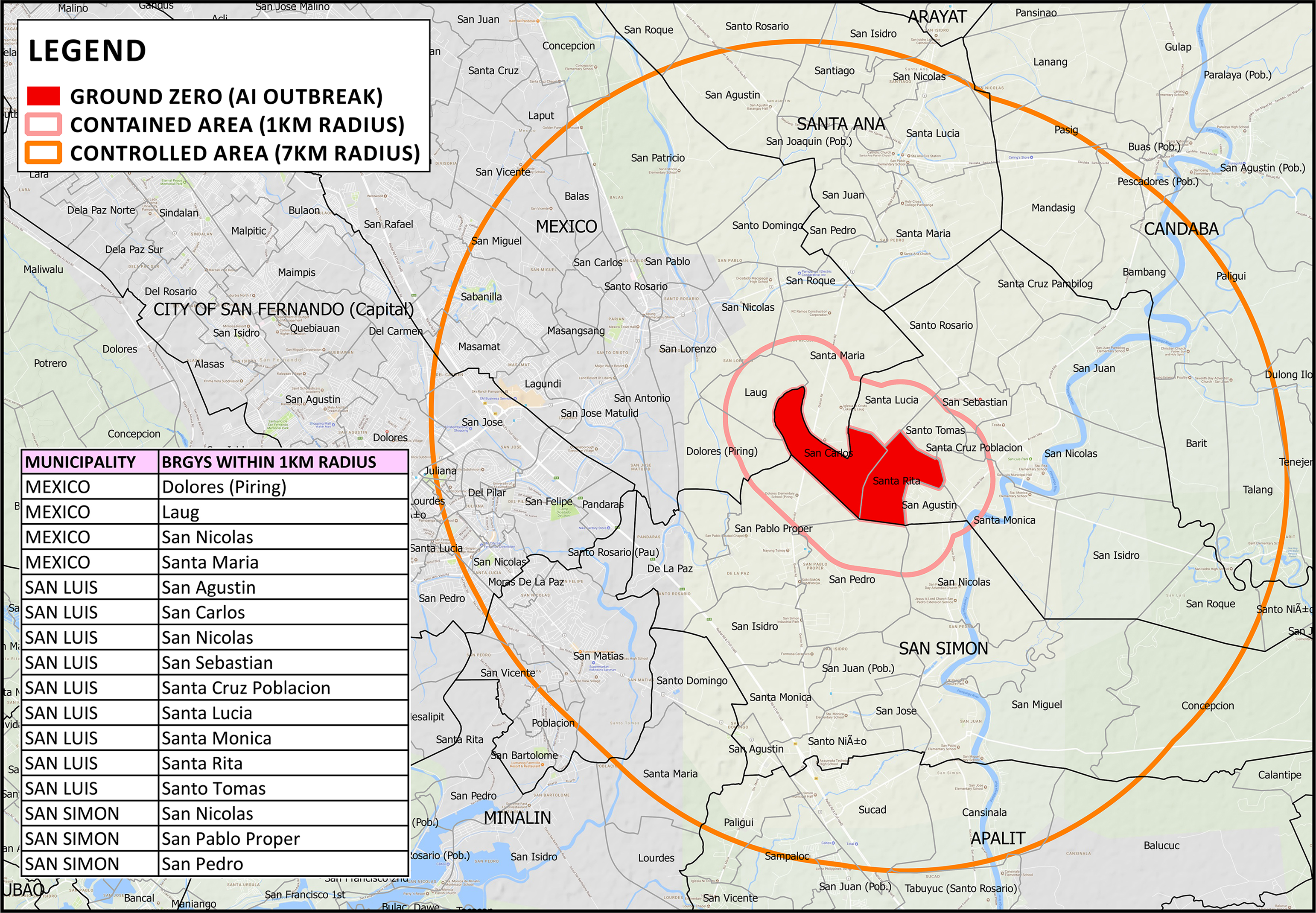
- The ground zero of the outbreak (in red) in the barangays of San Carlos, and Santa Rita in San Luis, Pampanga, Philippines.
- Date: April – September 2017
- Location: Central Luzon, Philippines; Pampanga; Nueva Ecija
- Type: Bird flu outbreak
- Deaths: 37,000 birds died from H5N6 (August 11); 600,000+ birds culled (September 4)

From April to September 2017 in the Philippines, an outbreak of H5N6 avian influenza or bird flu affected poultry in at least three towns in Central Luzon; San Luis in Pampanga and Jaen and San Isidro in Nueva Ecija.

The occurrence is the first avian flu outbreak recorded in the Philippines. While the occurrence of the disease was reported as early as April 2017, it was only on August 11, 2017, that the avian flu was confirmed. The outbreak was officially declared over in September 2017.

== Outbreak ==
Occurrence of avian influenza in Pampanga was first reported by farms in the last week of April 2017. The first farm to be affected by the disease was reportedly a quail farm. The Department of Agriculture (DA) confirmed the avian influenza outbreak on August 11, 2017, and a state of calamity was declared by the provincial government of Pampanga on the same day. By that time a total of 116,000 birds in farms has been identified to have the virus with 37,000 birds already dead due to the disease.

On August 18, 2017, Agriculture Secretary Manny Piñol confirmed occurrence of bird flu in the towns of Jaen and San Isidro in Nueva Ecija.

After the strain of the bird flu was confirmed to be H5N6 which can be transmitted to humans, it was reported on August 25, that Department of Health is monitoring 34 farm workers in Nueva Ecija and Pampanga as suspected human cases of the disease.

Agriculture Secretary Piñol declared the outbreak officially over on September 2, 2017, and eased quarantine measures.

== Cause ==
The strain of the avian influenza virus is not of the H5N1 strain according to the Research Institute for Tropical Medicine which conducted testings on samples of the virus from infected birds. The samples were sent to Australia where the Australian Animal Health Laboratory determined the exact strain of the virus. In the latter part of August 2017, the samples tested positive for H5N6 subtype. H5N6 can be transmitted to humans although it is less infectious and less fatal compared to the deadlier H5N1 strain.

== Prevention ==
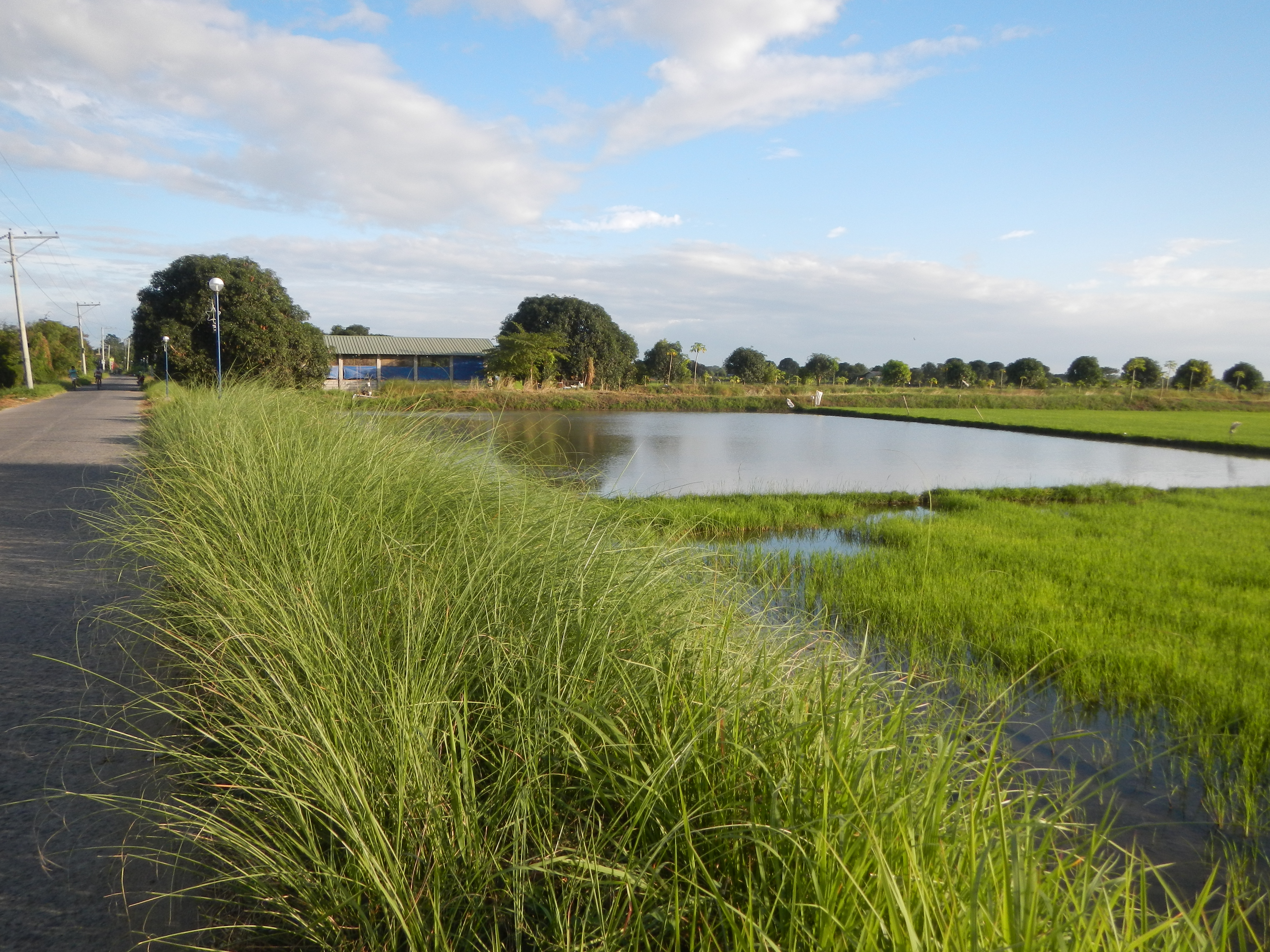
The quarantine zone was centered in Barangay San Carlos, San Luis.

The Philippines government has prepared a manual dating back as early as 2004 which tackles on dealing with an avian influenza (AI) outbreak in the country. Under the manual there are four possible stages of occurrence of bird flu in the country.

1. an AI-free nation
2. AI outbreak in poultry
3. AI transmission from poultry to humans
4. AI transmission among humans

The Philippines has been under stage 1 until the bird flu situation in the country was raised to stage 2 following the confirmation of the outbreak which started in Pampanga.

=== Quarantine and culling ===
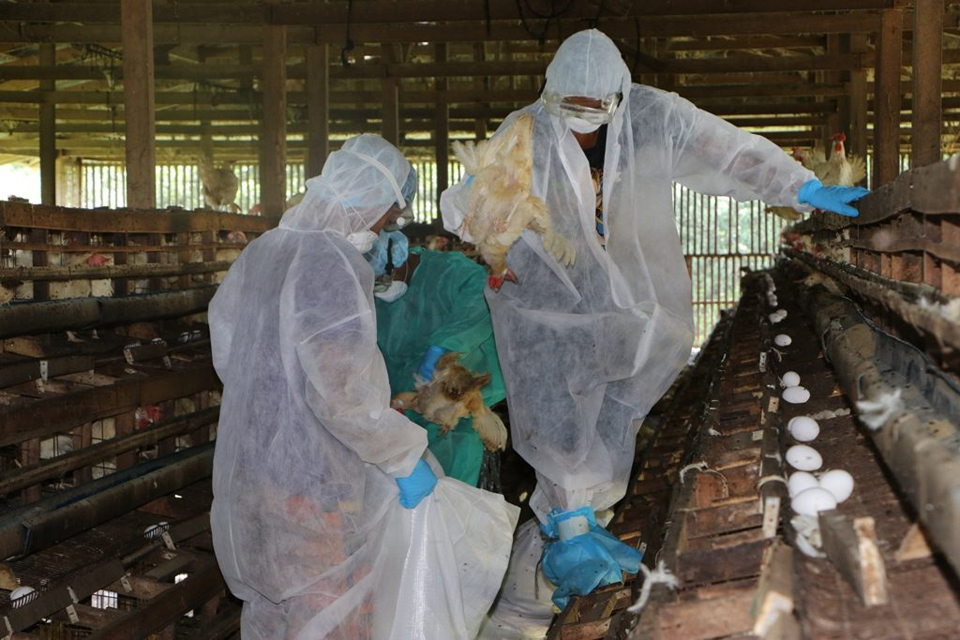
Chickens being culled in a Central Luzon farm.

A quarantine zone was imposed centering Barangay San Carlos of San Luis which covered an area 1 kilometer (0.62 mi). The quarantine radius covers five barangays in San Luis, Mexico and Santa Ana towns. Within the quarantine zone a total of 200 thousand birds wild or domesticated will be culled during a three-day period. The corpses will be buried in a highly elevated place. Animals within the designated area will be quarantined for 90 days while those in the surrounding area will be quarantined for 21 days. The quarantine zone was extended as far as 7 kilometers (4.3 mi) and was also imposed in Jaen and San Isidro, Nueva Ecija. This zone was reduced back to 1 kilometer on August 31, 2017.

500 soldiers has been mobilized to aid the culling efforts. By August 25, more than 470 thousand chickens, ducks, and quails has been culled. By September 2017, more than 600 thousand birds have been culled.

=== Trade ban ===
Through a circular dated on August 11, 2017, the Department of Agriculture imposed a temporary ban against transporting birds and poultry products from Pampanga to other parts of Luzon as well as banned the transfer of live poultry and poultry products from Luzon to Visayas and Mindanao to prevent the spread of the disease.

After consulting with biosecurity experts, the ban was partially lifted by August 23 but the transport of poultry from within the quarantine areas centered on affected towns in Pampanga and Nueva Ecija remains.

== Epidemiology ==
It is yet to be determined how avian influenza was successfully transmitted to the Philippines. The Department of Agriculture either suspects that the virus was transmitted by migratory birds or through the smuggling of Peking Ducks through Subic Port. The farm where the avian flu originated had a practice of setting up quails above ducks.

== Impact ==
The outbreak caused a drop of the farm gate prices of poultry. The prices dropped to ₱10 to ₱15 per kilogram (₱4.5 to ₱6.8 per pound) from the average price of ₱70 per kilogram (₱31.75 per pound). The poultry industry has estimated that it suffered a ₱179 million loss per day. As of August 23, 2017, the outbreak already costed the country's poultry industry ₱2.3 billion.

== Reactions ==
=== Poultry industry ===
Samahang Industriya ng Agrikultura (SINAG), an agriculture group, called for the Department of Agriculture's response to the incident to be more discreet saying that their handling of the outbreak has "over reaction" from the public. With the outbreak still officially limited to a single municipality at the time SINAG issued the statement, the group said that the outbreak is not "in magnitude, value, and volume" and the DA could have just said that the occurrence is an isolated case.

SINAG suspected that the DA may intend to "wantonly" import poultry abroad which the group says is a response to a "common chorus of an impending shortage". It called for a ban import of poultry from other countries which it deems to have worse or longer bird flu occurrences. It alleged that there is leniency to import poultry abroad and laments that the local poultry industry "always" had to suffer. It called for the lifting of the ban of transporting poultry from Luzon to the rest of the country. They welcomed the easing of the quarantine measures on August 31, 2017.

=== Other commercial establishments ===
The Jollibee Foods Corporation and McDonald's Philippines had issued statements that their product are safe to eat amidst the outbreak.

=== Foreign governments ===
The governments of Japan, Saudi Arabia, South Korea, and Singapore has imposed a ban on importing poultry from the Philippines to their country as countermeasures against the disease.

== Aftermath ==
The Department of Agriculture declared that they were able to "effectively contain" the outbreak. The government body will conduct a post-crisis analysis with poultry stakeholders where the DA will suggest greater bio-security measure in farms in the country. Agriculture Secretary Piñol said that many of the farms he visited in Pampanga lacked "basic bio-security facilities, like a simple footbath and vehicle disinfection facility" and a "disposal area for dead fowls or wastes within the farm area".

The incident is also cited as one of the major reason to loan a pair of Philippine eagles to Singapore as part of a conservation effort for the species. The move was to ensure that the Philippine eagle won't be rendered extinct in case of a similar incident to the 2017 outbreak would wipe out the eagle's population of the Philippines.
