= Blaan people =

Ethnic group

Blaan
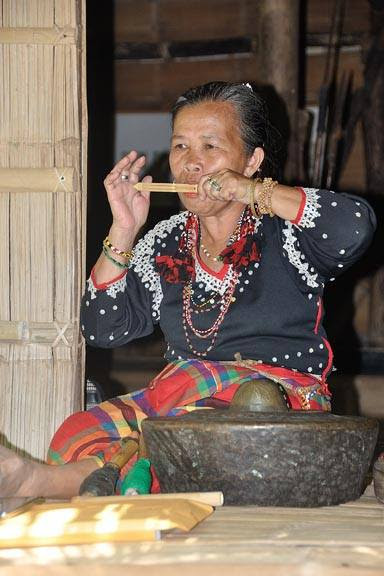
- A Blaan woman from Sarangani playing the mouth harp

Total population
- 373,392 (2020 census)

Regions with significant populations
- Philippines: Soccsksargen, Davao
- Sarangani: 120,954
- Davao del Sur: 89,949
- South Cotabato: 48,391
- General Santos: 20,769
- Sultan Kudarat: 9,078
- Cotabato: 5,988
- Davao City: 3,285

Languages
- Native; Blaan; Also; Cebuano, Hiligaynon, Filipino, English

Religion
- Christianity, Anito, Shamanism

Related ethnic groups
- Other Lumad peoples, Visayans, and other Austronesian peoples

The Blaan people, (Note: Sometimes erroneously referred to as "B'laan".) are one of the indigenous peoples of Southern Mindanao in the Philippines. Their name may be derived from "bla", meaning "opponent", and the "people"-denoting suffix "an". According to a 2021 genetic study, the Blaan people also have Papuan admixture.

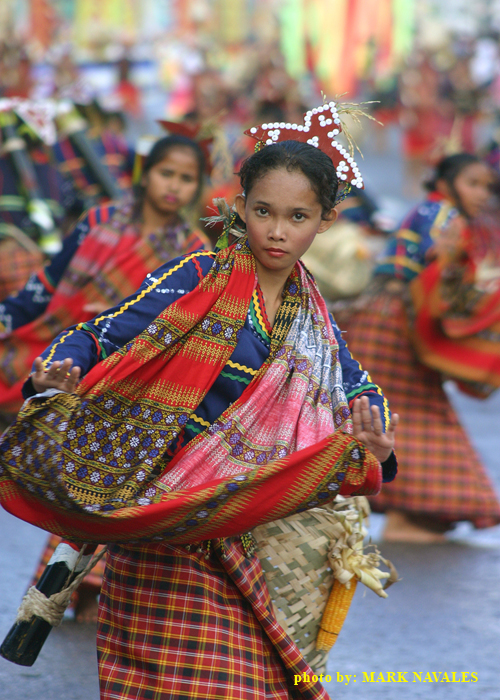
A Blaan girl.

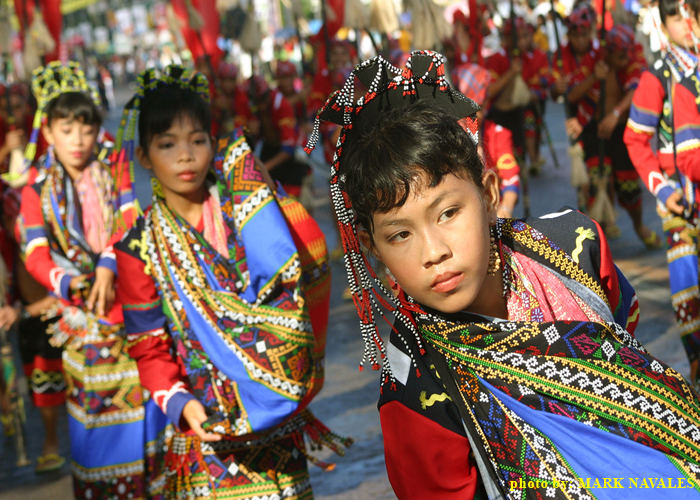
A Blaan offering tribe dance during colorful street dancing competition on the T'nalak Festival in South Cotabato.

== Classification ==
The Blaan are neighbors of the Tboli, and live near Lake Sebu and Tboli municipalities of South Cotabato, Sarangani, General Santos, the southeastern part of Davao and around Lake Buluan in Cotabato. They are famous for their brassworks, beadwork, and tabih weave. The people of these tribes wear colorful embroidered native costumes and beadwork accessories. The women of these tribes, particularly, wear heavy brass belts with brass "tassels" ending in tiny brass bells that herald their approach from afar.

== History ==
Some Blaan natives were displaced when General Santos was founded in 1939. Others settled in the city.

Their language is said to be the source of the name for Koronadal City, from two Blaan words – kalon meaning cogon grass and nadal or datal meaning plain, which aptly described the place for the natives. On the other hand, Marbel, which is another name for the poblacion, is a Blaan term malb-el which means "murky waters" referring to a river, now called Marbel River.

The tribe practices Indigenous rituals while adapting to the way of life of modern Filipinos.

Relations with settlers and their descendants are not always harmonious; settlers reportedly clashed with some Blaan natives in March 2015.

== Arts and culture ==
=== Language ===
Blaans speak their native language of the same name. However, they have additionally developed literacy in Cebuano, Hiligaynon, Tagalog and, to some extent, Ilocano. These languages were brought and introduced by settlers from Cebu, Bohol, Siquijor, Negros, Panay, Tagalog-speaking regions, Central Luzon and Ilocandia during the early 20th century.

=== Indigenous Blaan religion ===
Some of the deities in the Blaan pantheon include:

- Melu – The Supreme Being and creator. He has white skin and gold teeth. He is assisted by Fiuwe and Tasu Weh.
- Sawe – Joined Melu to live in the world
- Fiuwe – A spirit who lived in the sky.
- Diwata – A spirit who joined Fiuwe to live in the sky
- Tasu Weh – The evil spirit.
- Fon Kayoo – The spirit of the trees.
- Fon Eel – The spirit of water.
- Fon Batoo – The spirit of rocks and stones.
- Tau Dilam Tana – The spirit who lives in the underworld
- Loos Klagan – The most feared deity, uttering his name is considered a curse.

=== Weaving tradition ===
The Blaans have a system of weaving using abaca fiber. The art of abaca weaving is called mabal or mabal tabih, while the cloth produced by this process is called the tabih.

Blaan weavers do not use spinning wheels. Instead, they join together by hand strands of the abaca fiber, which are then used to weave the tabih.

Fu Yabing Dulo was one of two surviving master designers left of the mabal tabih art of ikat weaving. Estelita Bantilan, who was given the National Living Treasures Award in 2016, is a master weaver of traditional mats known as igêm.

=== Brass and copper work and beadwork ===
The Blaan have a tradition of creating art from brass and copper. The Blaan smelt brass and copper to produce small bells and handles of long knives. These knives, called the fais, are made with intricately designed brass.

The Blaan also sew plastic beads or shell sequins to create intricate designs on women's blouses and trousers, called the takmon. Geometric and other designs depicting the environment or the Solar System are sewn using cotton yarns onto men's pants and shirts, called the msif.

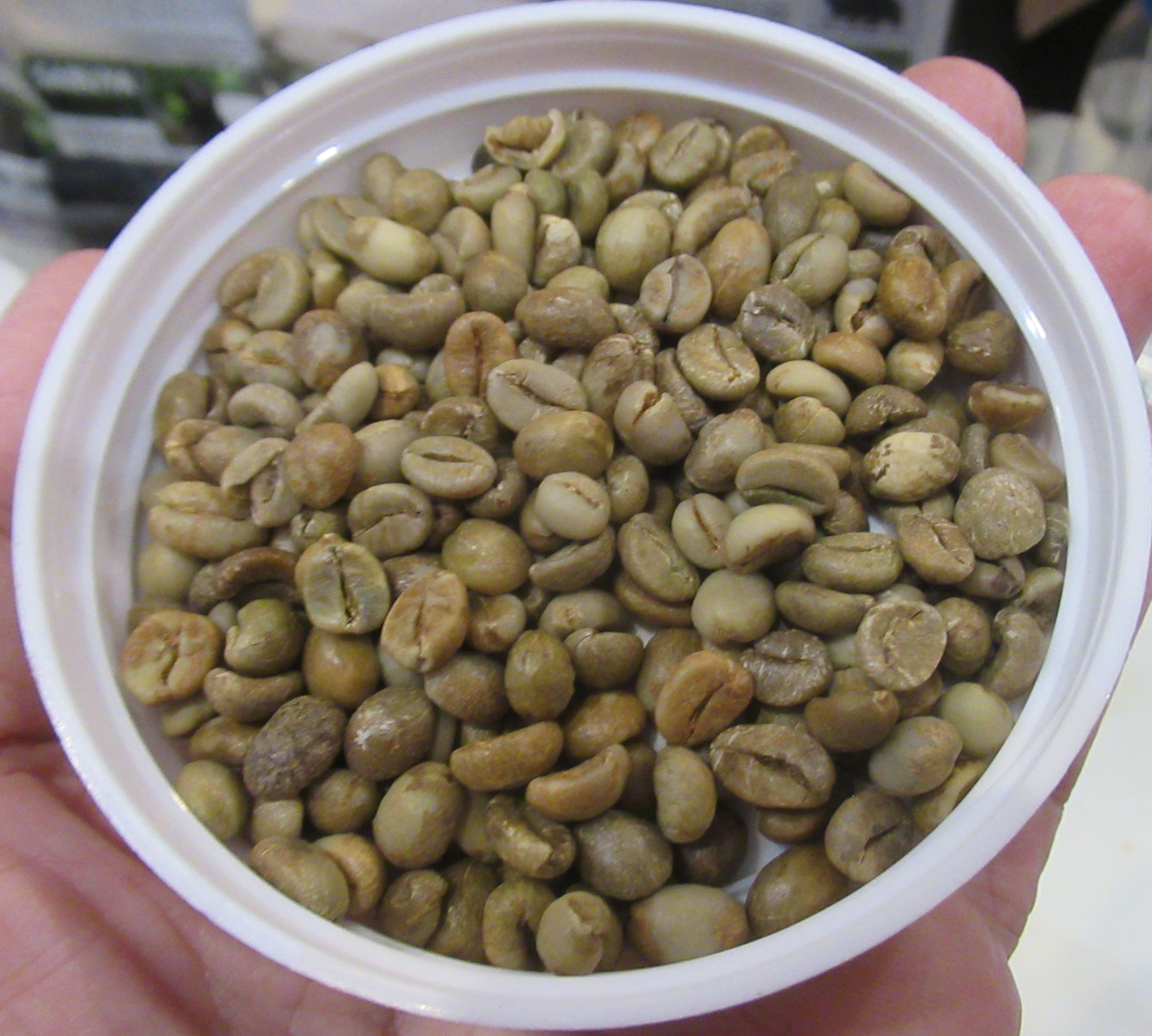
Cleaned civet beans

=== Wild civet coffee ===
The Blaan tribe at the foot of Mount Matutum Protected Landscape support their livelihoods by collecting the feces of the Philippine palm civet for processing into wild civet coffee. Sitio 8 village, Barangay Kinilis, Polomolok is famous as a civet coffee-producing settlement.

== Notable Blaans ==
- Fu Yabing Dulo, a textile master weaver and dyer, credited with preserving the Blaan traditional mabal tabih art of ikat weaving and dyeing.
