= Yabing Masalon Dulo =

Filipino textile weaver (1914–2021)

Fu Yabing Masalon Dulo
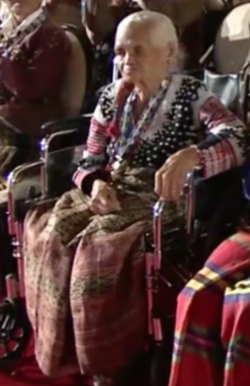
- Dulo in 2018
- Born: August 8, 1914; Cotabato, Philippine Islands, U.S.
- Died: January 26, 2021 (aged 106); South Cotabato, Philippines
- Known for: Textile
- Style: Blaan traditional mabal tabih weaving and dyeing
- Awards: National Living Treasure Award; 2016

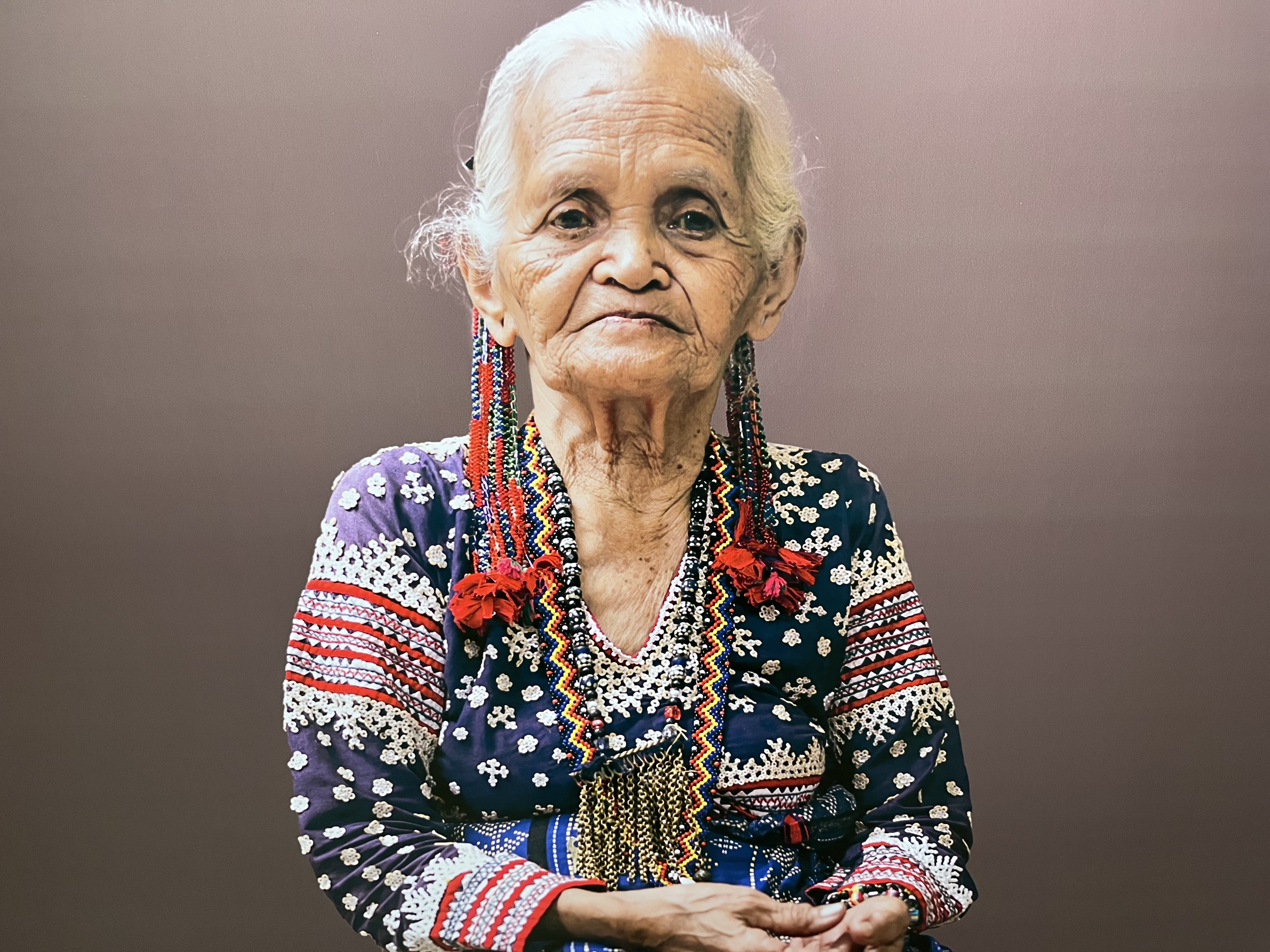
Manlilikha ng Bayan awardee

Fu Yabing Masalon Dulo (August 8, 1914 – January 26, 2021), commonly referred to as Fu Yabing, was a Filipino textile master weaver and dyer, credited with preserving the Blaan traditional mabal tabih art of ikat weaving and dyeing. At the time of her death, she was one of only two surviving master designers of the mabal tabih art of the indigenous Blaan people of southern Mindanao in the Philippines.

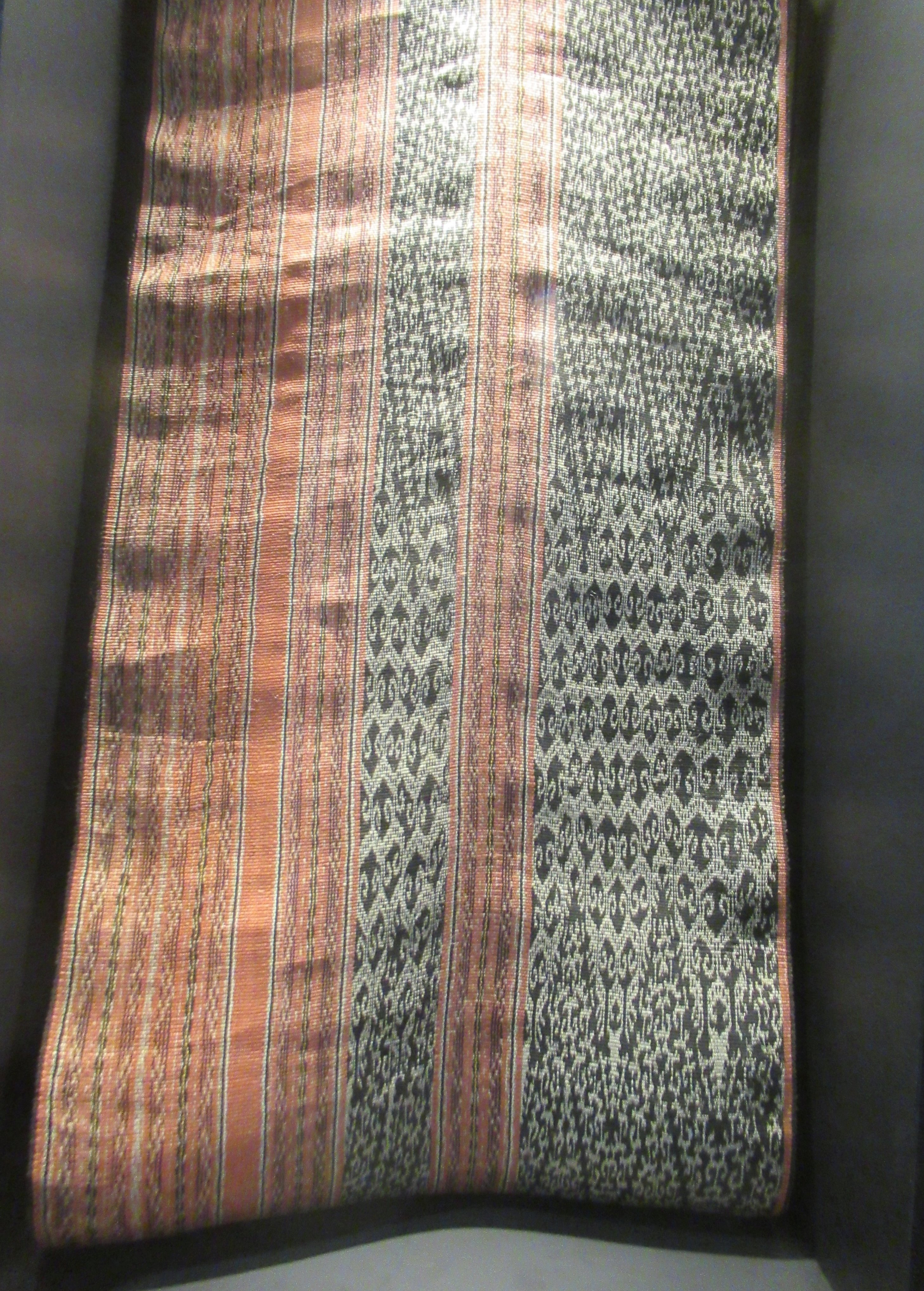
Dulo's Mabal tabih, Polomolok

She was given the National Living Treasures Award by the Philippines through the National Commission for Culture and the Arts.

== Biography ==
Fu Yabing was born on August 8, 1914, in modern-day Polomolok, South Cotabato. She resided on Mount Matutum. Fu Yabing began weaving at age 14. At the time she was born, the United States began its ambition to transform Mindanao as a "land of promise" for industrialized agriculture. During this period, the Blaan people were marginalized, pushed from their settlements to smaller spaces excluded from industrial estates. Their situation further worsened by violence during the 1970s because of the Communist insurgency at the time.

Despite the landscape of which she grew up with, Dulo, along with her husband, continued the Blaan's tradition of animism. She also maintained her understanding of weaving quality.

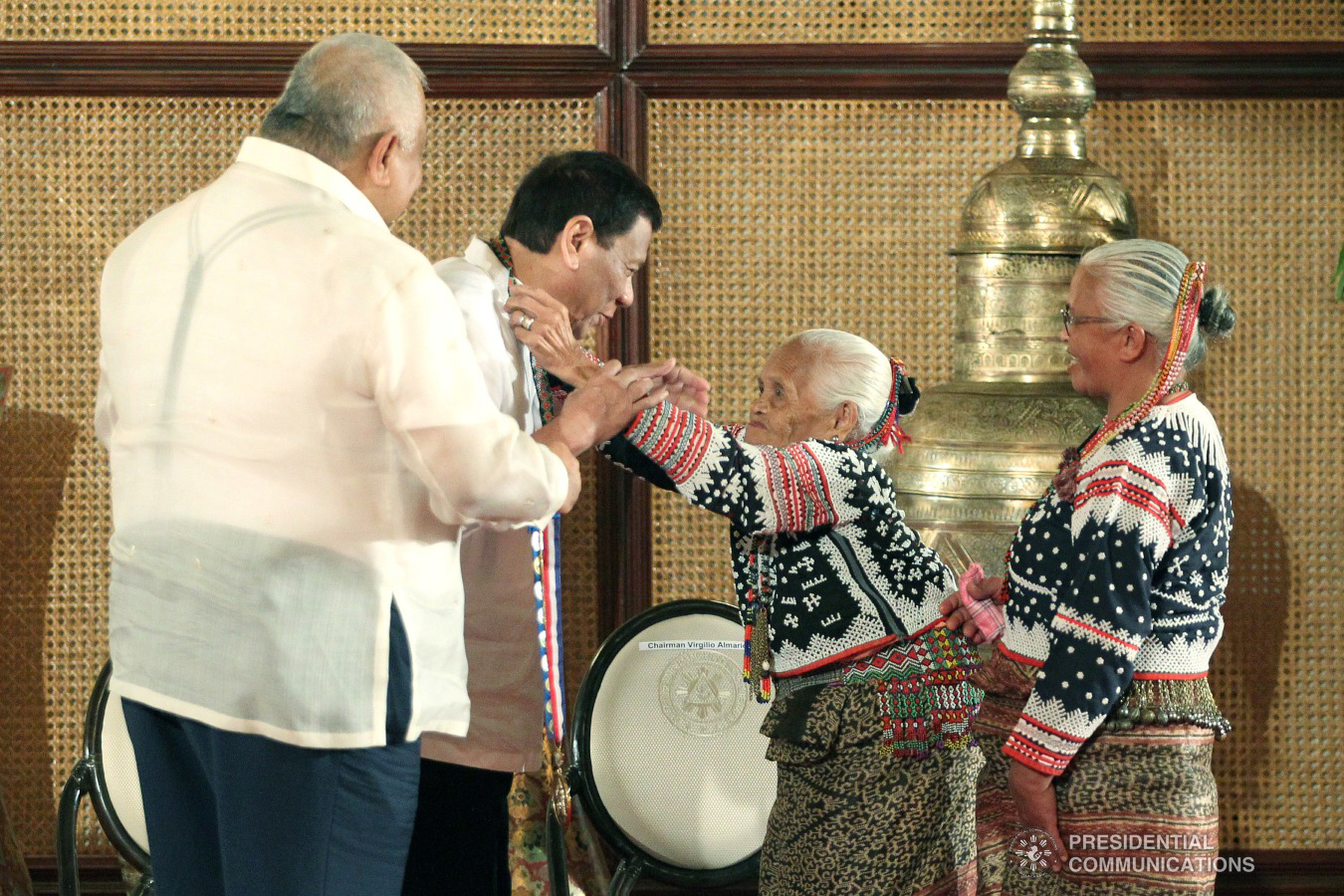
Philippine president Rodrigo Duterte received a token from Dulo during the awarding ceremony of the 2018 conferment awards

With the help of her grandniece, Arjho Cariño Turner, she was able to teach her weaving skills to students in nearby villages in upland B'laan in Lamlifew, Malungon, Sarangani. In 2009, Dulo flew to Manila to engage in the ASEAN Textile Symposium at the National Museum of the Philippines. Two of her tabih are considered masterpieces. One of these is displayed in the Philippine National Museum.

She was named a recipient of the National Living Treasure Award in 2016 but it was formally awarded to her in October 2018.

To preserve the Blaan weaving tradition, Fu Yabing taught the craft of tabih to her only daughter Lamina Dulo Gulili and women in her community. She was also given the honorific "Fu," as a Blaan elder.

She retired from weaving in 2018 after a motorcycle accident.

Fu Yabing died in her sleep on January 26, 2021, at the age of 106.

== Reception and legacy ==
The National Commission for Culture and the Arts praised Dulo for her exceptional skill in Blaan Mabal Tabih and her long-standing role as a teacher and cultural elder within her community. The tabih cloth is a work of art that takes months to create. The process of preparing the loom and the abaca fiber is communal while the design and its execution is done by the master weaver.

In an essay by traditional art scholar Marian Pastor-Roces, she regarded Dulo as a "venerable ikat-dyer" who has a sharper memory than blades.

The National Commission for Culture and the Arts installed a marker honoring Dulo in her hometown in Polomolok.
