= World Apostolic Congress on Mercy =

Catholic religious event

The World Apostolic Congress on Mercy (WACOM) is a religious event launched by Pope Benedict XVI that draws from the teachings of Faustina Kowalska.

The first WACOM occurred in Rome in 2008 with subsequent events in Kraków (2011), Bogotá (2014) and Manila (2017). The inaugural event at the Vatican drew four thousand from two hundred delegations.

In 2014, a delegation of one thousand went to the Congress in Colombia, and the 2017 event involved more than five thousand attendees.

== Congresses ==
1. Rome, April 2-6, 2008
2. Kraków, October 1-5, 2011
3. Bogotá, August 15-19, 2014
4. Manila, January 16-20, 2017
5. Apia, May 21-26, 2023 (rescheduled from 2020)
6. Vilnius, June 7-12, 2026

== See also ==
- Divine Mercy (Catholic devotion)
