= 2017–2019 transport strikes in the Philippines =

Series of strikes and protests in the Philippines

2017–2019 Philippine jeepney drivers' strike
- Part of Protests against Rodrigo Duterte
- Date: February 6, 2017 – September 30, 2019 (2 years, 7 months, 3 weeks and 3 days)
- Location: Philippines
- Caused by: Government's plan to phase out jeepneys over 15 years old
- Goals: Stop the government's plan and pursue modernization in line with national industrialization
- Methods: Protest, strike action

Parties
Jeepney transport groups: Pinagkaisang Samahan ng mga Tsuper at Operators Nationwide (PISTON); Stop and Go Coalition; No to Jeepney Phase Out Coalition	Government of the Philippines; Department of Transportation: Land Transportation Franchising and Regulatory Board; Philippine National Police Metropolitan Manila Development Authority

Lead figures
Non-centralized leadership	Rodrigo Duterte; Arthur Tugade; Martin Delgra III

The 2017–2019 Philippine jeepney drivers' strike was a series of protest and strike action staged by jeepney drivers in the Philippines to oppose the government's plan to phase out jeepneys over 15 years old. The strike, which started on February 6, caused hundreds of passengers to be stranded and prompted universities, cities, and towns to suspend classes. Part of the protest is to forward an alternative on modernization based upon national industrialization and not corporate takeover.

== Protests ==
=== 2017 ===
==== Suspension of classes ====
Afternoon classes in the cities of Manila, Malabon, and Pasay were suspended. Classes in Adamson University, Colegio de San Juan de Letran, De La Salle University, Far Eastern University, National University, University of the Philippines Manila, and University of Santo Tomas were also suspended.

==== Suspension of classes ====
On the evening of February 26, Malacañang Palace, through the Office of the Executive Secretary, suspended the classes for elementary and secondary levels in Metro Manila. Several universities, cities and towns—such as Makati, Iloilo City, Talisay, Cebu, Mandaue, Navotas, Pateros, Cainta, Parañaque, Taytay, Valenzuela, Bacolod, and Antipolo—have suspended classes.

==== October 16–17 ====
On October 15, 2017, Malacañang announced that classes and government work were suspended throughout the Philippines on the second day of strike, October 17, 2017, due to the third strike. The Metropolitan Manila Development Authority (MMDA) suspended the enforcement of the Unified Vehicular Volume Reduction Program (UVVRP), known as the number coding scheme on October 17, 2017, the second day of the strike. The Department of Foreign Affairs (DFA) announced that its consular offices closed on the first day of strike, October 16, 2017.

=== 2018 ===
==== March 19 ====
On March 19, 2018, PISTON held the fourth protest against the jeepney modernization.

===== Suspension of classes =====
Malacañang announced that classes suspended throughout Metro Manila on March 19, 2018, due to the strike.

==== June 25 ====
On June 25, 2018, Piston held the fifth protest against the jeepney modernization.

===== Suspension of classes =====
Albay Governor Al Francis Bichara announced on June 22 that classes suspended in some portions of Albay due to the strike on June 25.

=== 2019 ===
==== September 30 ====
On September 30, 2019, Piston held the sixth protest against the jeepney modernization.

===== Suspension of classes =====
Classes are suspended in several areas in the Philippines due to the strike.

== See also ==
- 2023 transport strike in the Philippines
