= San Lorenzo Ruiz Academy of Polomolok =

Private high school in South Cotabato, Philippines

- Académie Saint Lorenzo Ruiz de Polomolok

Location
- Polomolok, South Cotabato; Philippines
- Coordinates: 6°13′21″N 125°04′36″E

Information
- Former names: Jose L. Valencia Academy (1963–1987)
- Type: Private Non-Sectarian High School
- Established: 1988
- Principal: Medy G. Lamboso
- Campus: Valencia Site, Poblacion, Polomolok
- Colors: White, blue & gold
- Nickname: SLRAPians
- Affiliation: Roman Catholic
- Patron Saint: Saint Lorenzo Ruiz

San Lorenzo Ruiz Academy is a High School Academy in Polomolok, South Cotabato, Philippines. It was founded by the Marist Brothers of the Schools in 1967. The Marist Brothers had transferred its ownership to the Mahintana Educational Association Inc. in 1967 and was renamed as Jose L. Valencia Academy and was later renamed it back to the first name of the school.
