= Manila Police District secret jail cell scandal =

2017 police scandal in the Philippines

On April 27, 2017, a scandal arose when a team from the Commission of Human Rights (CHR) raided the Manila Police District (MPD) station 1 in Tondo, Manila, Philippines and discovered that about 12 men and women were being detained inside a cell hidden behind a bookshelf. It was reported that these prisoners inside the said cell were being held by the police allegedly to be released only upon payment of ransom.

== Background ==
On April 27, 2017, the Commission of Human Rights-NCR (CHR-NCR) team, led by Chief Gilbert Boiser, raid the Manila Police District station and discovered the so-called 'hidden jail', measuring five-feet wide, behind the bookshelf, which contained about 12 prisoners and it was poorly ventilated—except for an exhaust fan. CHR spokesperson Jacqueline de Guia told the Philippine Star "that the commission confirmed that 12 people have been detained for at least 10 days without the filing of charges." The officials insisted that they are still processing the detainees' arrest notifications and refused the requests of freeing the detainees by the CHR.

As a result, MPD station commander Supt. Robert Domingo and other 12 officers were relieved temporarily from his post on April 28. Domingo denied the allegations and said the area "is only a “holding room” of the station's drug enforcement unit." He also said that the 12 individuals were arrested during their operation on early morning of April 27 for possession of illegal drugs. President Rodrigo Duterte vowed to look into the secret jail, in his interview in Malacañang on April 28, along with Philippine National Police chief Ronald "Bato" dela Rosa.

The MPD jail cell was not the first such secret police detention cell discovered in the Philippines. In January 2014, Amnesty International reported the discovery of a secret torture cell in a police intelligence facility in Biñan, Laguna where officers allegedly routinely tortured 44 inmates for fun in a game of roulette. The Commission on Human Rights which raided the facility discovered the ‘torture roulette’ table which had markings indicating the kind of torture to be used on the detainees. The detainees of the Biñan secret cell, most of which were arrested on drugs-related cases, complained of being physically abused to force them to give information. They also accused 10 police officers of extortion. Amnesty International called on the administration of then President Benigno Aquino III to put an end to routine torture in police facilities and for the errant personnel to not just be suspended, but also be held accountable in a court of law.

== Detainees ==
Some detainees claimed that the police demanded between P30,000 to P100,000 from them in exchange of their release. Others claimed that they were being tortured. One of the detainees inside the secret jail, a woman, in an interview of DZMM-AM, said that one of the police demanded her a P50,000, in exchange of her release, after she is being accused of involvement in an illegal drug trade despite the lack of evidence against her.

== Reactions ==
On April 28, international non-government organization Human Rights Watch (HRW) condemned the anti-drug campaign by Duterte amid the discovery of the secret jail at the MPD station 1. HRW also urged the Philippine government for immediately release of 12 detainees.

National Capital Region police chief Director Oscar Albayalde stated that the hidden jail was "purposefully used as a staging area." and the purpose of this was unclear. Dela Rosa criticizes the CHR for visiting the station and defended the police, stating that "as long as cops were not corrupt and abusive." Albayalde thanked the CHR for "taking time to inspect the detention cells of our stations so that they're able to see the real condition of these facilities."

Senate minority leader Franklin Drilon urged the Philippine National Police (PNP) leadership to prosecute instead of defending the police officers behind the secret jail. On April 30, Senator Panfilo Lacson stated, in his Twitter account, that defending the secret jail is "incomprehensible" and "it is also very arrogant." On May 2, Senator Bam Aquino sought for a Senate investigation into the secret jail cell. Aquino also criticized dela Rosa who defended the police officers over the jail cell, stating it encourages a “culture of impunity.”
