= Polomolok =

Municipality in South Cotabato, Philippines

- Municipality
- Municipality of Polomolok

Other transcription(s)
  - Jawi: ڤولومولوک
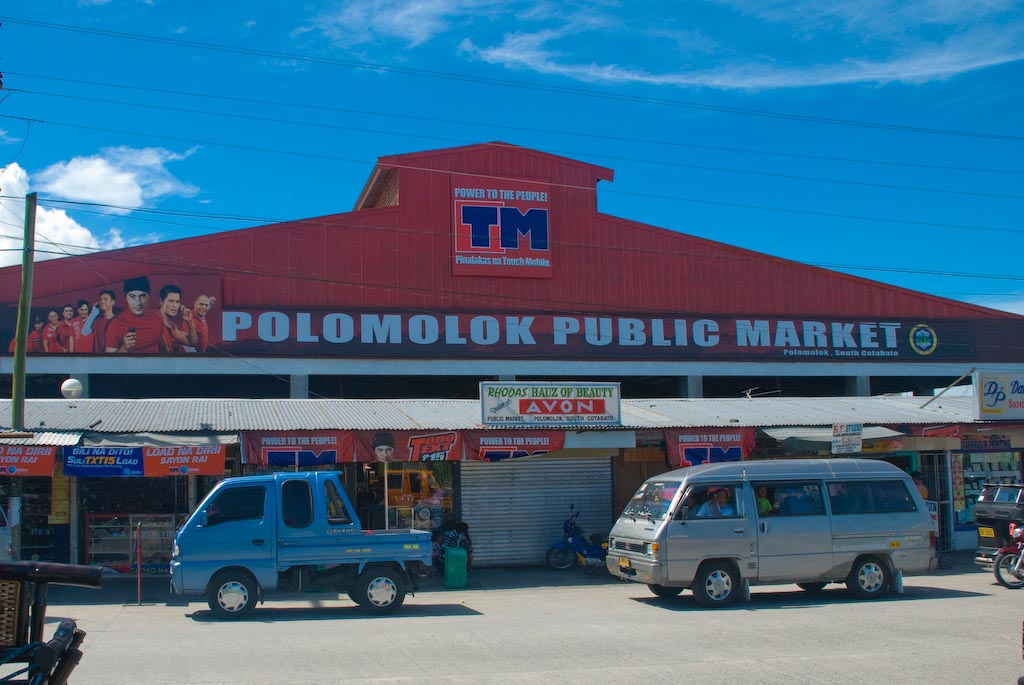
- Polomolok Public Market

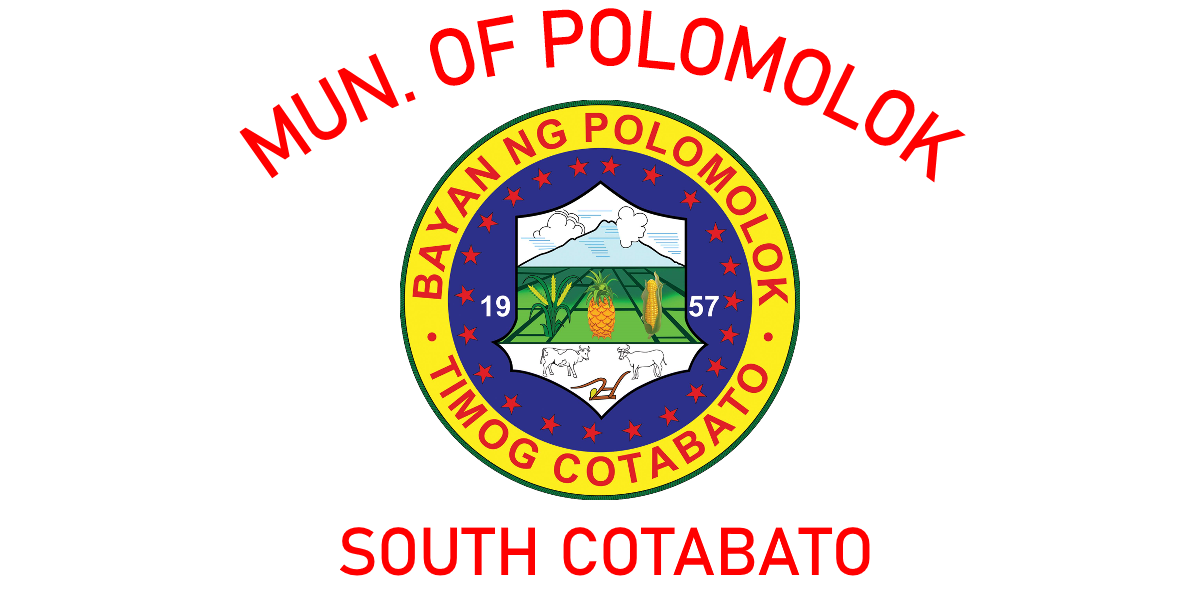
- Flag Seal
- Nicknames: Agroindustrial Center of South Cotabato; Land of Pineapple Shore; Little Brazil of the Philippines
- Motto: Bagong Polomolok
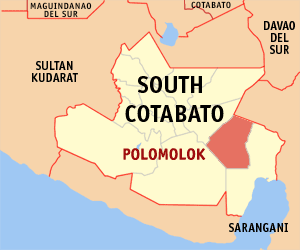
- Map of South Cotabato with Polomolok highlighted
- Interactive map of Polomolok
- Location within the Philippines
- Coordinates: 6°13′14″N 125°03′47″E
- Country: Philippines
- Region: Soccsksargen
- Province: South Cotabato
- District: 1st district
- Founded: August 21, 1957
- Inauguration date: September 10, 1957
- Barangays: 23 (see Barangays)

Government
  - Type: Sangguniang Bayan
  - Mayor: Bernie D. Palencia
  - Vice Mayor: Jingle Bansuelo-Carlos
  - Representative: Isidro D. Lumayag
  - Municipal Council: Members: Joar Falcon; Eliazar G. Jovero; Ligaya R. Orbesido; Calixto B. Salada; Billy Bert Baitus Jr.; Antonio B. Octavio; Dave Amor; John Edward L. Lumayag
  - Electorate: 114,676 voters (2025)

Area
  - Total: 339.97 km^{2} (131.26 sq mi)
- Elevation: 306 m (1,004 ft)
- Highest elevation: 530 m (1,740 ft)
- Lowest elevation: 159 m (522 ft)

Population (July 1, 2024)
  - Total: 176,671
  - Density: 519.67/km^{2} (1,345.9/sq mi)
  - Households: 43,191

Economy
  - Income class: 1st municipal income class
  - Poverty incidence: 12.75% (2023)
  - Revenue: ₱ 826.9 million (2024)
  - Assets: ₱ 2,658 million (2024)
  - Expenditure: ₱ 763.1 million (2024)
  - Liabilities: ₱ 852.6 million (2024)

Service provider
  - Electricity: South Cotabato 2 Electric Cooperative (SOCOTECO 2)
  - Water: Polomolok Water District
  - Wireless Telecommunications: Smart (with TNT, Sun Cellular), Globe (with TM, GOMO), DITO
  - Wired Telecommunications: PLDT, Globe, MarbelTel
  - Internet Service Providers (ISPs): PLDT, Globe, MarbelTel, Converge, DCTech
  - Cable TV: Cignal, SkyCable, GSAT, SatLite
- Time zone: UTC+8 (PST)
- ZIP code: 9504
- PSGC: 1206312000
- IDD : area code: +63 (0)83
- Native languages: Hiligaynon; Cebuano; Maguindanao; Blaan; Tagalog
- Website: polomolok.gov.ph

Polomolok, officially the Municipality of Polomolok, (Note: Koronadal Blaan: Banwe Folomolok; Hiligaynon: Banwa sang Polomolok; Cebuano: Lungsod sa Polomolok; Tagalog: Bayan ng Polomolok; Kapampangan: Balen ning Polomolok; Maguindanaon: Inged nu Pulumuluk, Jawi: ايڠد نو ڤولومولوک) is a municipality in the province of South Cotabato, Philippines. In the 2024 census, it has a population of 176,671 people making it both the most populated municipality in Mindanao and the most populated municipality outside Luzon.

It is located between General Santos and Tupi. Polomolok is seated about 41 kilometres (25 mi) south-east of the provincial capital city of Koronadal, 17 kilometres (11 mi) north of the port city of General Santos and 1,030 kilometres (640 mi) south-east of the national capital Manila. As of 2019, it is the second wealthiest Municipality in Mindanao with PHP 1.77 Billion worth of assets and in 2021, Polomolok is the 2nd Most Competitive Municipality in Mindanao (9th Nationwide). Polomolok also serves as the chief town in the 1st District of South Cotabato.

On March 2, 2020, former South Cotabato First District Representative Shirlyn Bañas-Nograles filed House Bill No. 6432 for the conversion of the Municipality of Polomolok into a component city of South Cotabato.

== History ==
The name Polomolok is derived from the Blaan term flomlok, meaning "hunting ground." In its early years, the area where the present-day Poblacion stands was known for its abundance of wild life. With no established roads, lowland settlers relied on the Blaan highlanders as guides. In addition to its rich hunting grounds, Polomolok was characterized by numerous creeks with clear, free-flowing water from the surrounding hills, which attracted settlers. Among the early inhabitants was a Japanese trader, Zenjiro Takahashi, and his Blaan wife. He began clearing the land and cultivating agricultural crops. Over time, Christian settlers also arrived, further developing the area.

In 1940, the Philippines Commonwealth government embarked on a very bold program of social amelioration. One of the projects was the distribution of lands to interested people who wanted to settle in Mindanao. Settlers were brought by boat to Dadiangas (General Santos) from Luzon and Visayas. On November 2, 1940, Polomolok was officially opened for settlement and known as Polomok Settlement District. Atty. Ernesto Jimenez was appointed as its first overseer. He was responsible for the allocation of farm lots. Then came the creation of some barrios of the settlers. These were Palkan, Lemblisong, Polo, Polomolok Central (now Poblacion), Polomolok Creek (now Magsaysay), Sulit, Lamcaliaf, Kinilis, Glamang, Bentung, Koronadal Proper, Leve, and Silway. The first settlers, after a crop or two, started to invite their friends and relatives to settle in this place, because the soil was so fertile that any crop can survive due to favorable climate conditions.

The settlement program was disrupted for four years during the Second World War. During this period, Don Francisco Natividad was appointed Military Mayor, with Datu Badung Nilong serving as Vice Mayor and Sgt. Nuevarez as Chief of Police. In 1948, Perfecto Balili was designated as NLSA Administrator, with Rosendo Sarte acting as Officer-in-Charge. In 1954, the National Land Settlement Administration (NLSA) was abolished as part of a government reorganization, and its records were transferred to the Board of Liquidators. Meanwhile, the Municipality of General Santos (formerly Buayan) was formally incorporated.

On August 21, 1957, the Municipality of Polomolok was created by virtue of a Presidential Executive Order No. 264 signed by President Carlos P. Garcia. It started functioning as a regular and independent municipality on September 10, 1957, as a 6th class municipality. The local officials were appointed by the President. Its first appointed Mayor was Datu Badong Nilong.

From 1957 to 1963, the progress of this town was still very slow. Fields have always been green, harvest bountiful but farm products had low market value and circulation of cash was rather slow. Then came a breakthrough, when the largest pineapple company, the Dole Philippines Inc., was planted and inaugurated on December 7, 1963.

== Geography ==
Located at the southern part of South Cotabato, Polomolok is nestled at the base of the prominent Mount Matutum. It is cone-shaped volcano and looms over the provinces at 2,286 metres (7,500 ft) high, a unique challenge to mountaineers. It is perhaps the provinces most imposing landmark.

Natural hot and cold spring abound at its foot. Natural springs are abundant within this area and provide free flowing water. Two of these springs have developed into natural resorts.

=== Barangays ===
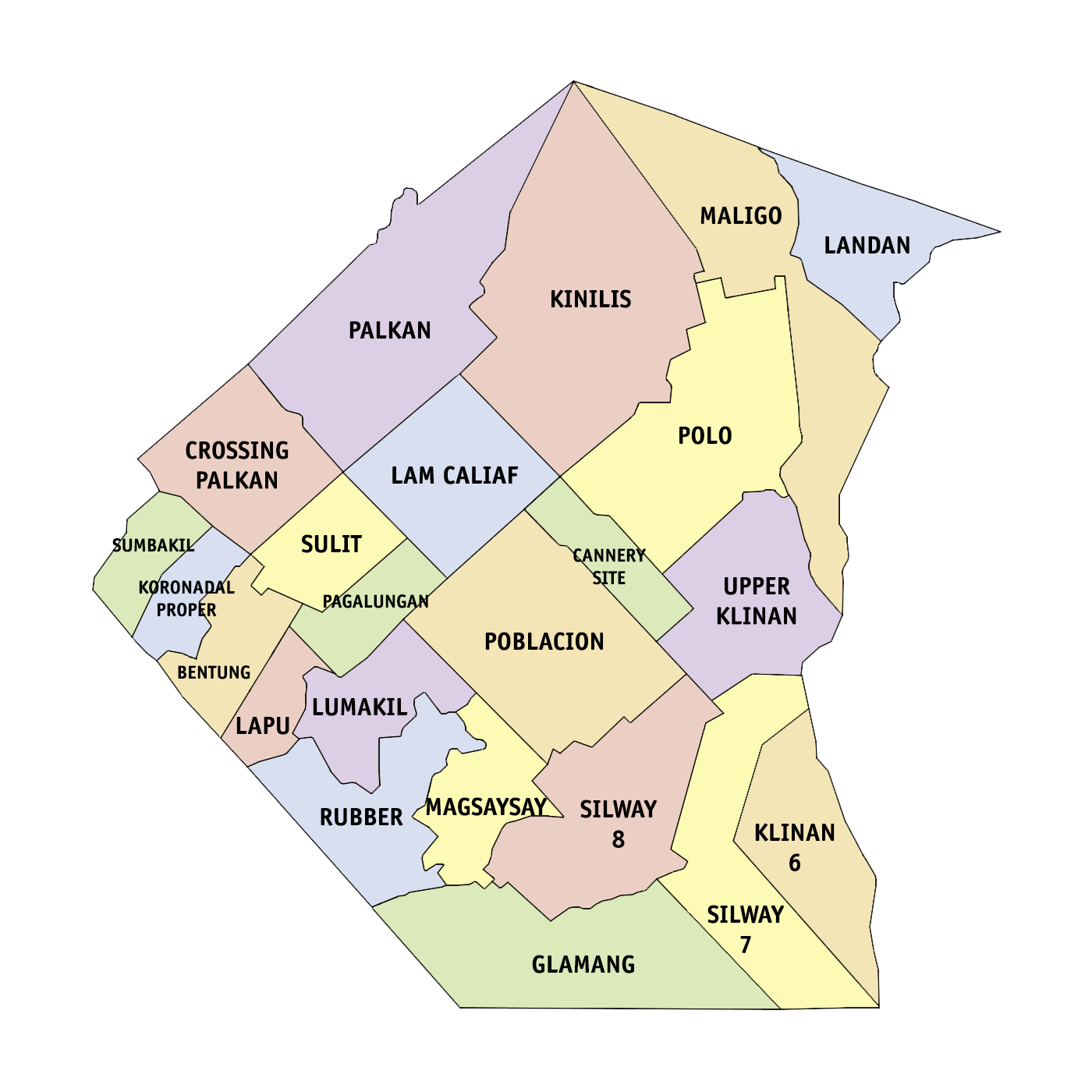
Political map of Polomolok.

Polomolok is politically subdivided into 23 barangays. Each barangay consists of puroks while some have sitios.

Barangay Poblacion is also known as Polomolok itself. There are 5 urban barangays and 18 rural barangays.

Barangay/s	Population (2024)	Classification
Poblacion (Polomolok)	51,082	Urban
Cannery Site	23,658	Urban
Magsaysay	14,223	Urban
Bentung	1,579	Rural
Crossing Palkan	2,698	Rural
Glamang	10,174	Urban
Kinilis	2,106	Rural
Klinan 6	4,318	Rural
Koronadal Proper	4,138	Rural
Lam Caliaf	1,779	Rural
Landan	6,645	Rural
Lapu	2,237	Rural
Lumakil	4,165	Rural
Maligo	3,952	Rural
Pagalungan	3,419	Rural
Palkan	3,942	Rural
Polo	2,875	Rural
Rubber	4,047	Rural
Silway 7	3,120	Rural
Silway 8	13,569	Urban
Sulit	6,173	Rural
Sumbakil	1,446	Rural
Upper Klinan	5,326	Rural

=== Climate ===
Climate data for Polomolok, South Cotabato
Month	Jan	Feb	Mar	Apr	May	Jun	Jul	Aug	Sep	Oct	Nov	Dec	Year
Mean daily maximum °C (°F)	29 (84)	29 (84)	30 (86)	30 (86)	29 (84)	28 (82)	28 (82)	28 (82)	29 (84)	28 (82)	29 (84)	29 (84)	29 (84)
Mean daily minimum °C (°F)	21 (70)	21 (70)	21 (70)	22 (72)	23 (73)	23 (73)	22 (72)	22 (72)	22 (72)	23 (73)	22 (72)	22 (72)	22 (72)
Average precipitation mm (inches)	54 (2.1)	41 (1.6)	56 (2.2)	81 (3.2)	154 (6.1)	212 (8.3)	223 (8.8)	218 (8.6)	192 (7.6)	184 (7.2)	135 (5.3)	73 (2.9)	1,623 (63.9)
Average rainy days	10.4	9.1	11.2	14.4	24.6	27.0	26.7	26.1	25.6	26.9	22.6	15.1	239.7
Source: Meteoblue

Polomolok features a tropical rainforest climate (Af), according to the Köppen-Geiger climate classification, with significant rainfall year-round and constantly hot temperatures. Since this tropical rainforest climate is more subject to the Intertropical Convergence Zone than the trade winds and experiences very few cyclones, it is subequatorial. The city experiences considerable rainfall during the year, even during the driest month. The average annual temperature is 25.7 °C in Polomolok. In a year, the average rainfall is 1410 mm. March is the driest month, and June is the wettest month in the city.

== Demographics ==
Population census of Polomolok
Year	Pop.	±% p.a.
1960	15,536	—
1970	32,570	+7.67%
1975	40,544	+4.49%
1980	59,312	+7.90%
1990	89,372	+4.19%
1995	96,274	+1.40%
2000	110,709	+3.04%
2007	131,436	+2.40%
2010	138,273	+1.86%
2015	152,589	+1.89%
2020	172,605	+2.63%
2024	176,671	+0.56%
Source: Philippine Statistics Authority

Polomolok Municipal Hall plaza

Polomolok has a population of 176,671 people as per census data of 2024, thus making it the most populated town (next to Koronadal City) in the province.

Based on its latest population, it is the most populous municipality in Mindanao, the largest municipality in the Soccsksargen Region and 12th most populous municipality in the Philippines. Cebuano (Sinugbuanong Binisaya ) is widely spoken and is the native language of majority of the municipality's inhabitants. Tagalog is also widely spoken and understood in the municipality. There is also a minority Kapampangan-speakers who are also residents in the municipality. Hiligaynon (Binisaya nga Hiniligaynon/Inilonggo), Ilocano, Maguindanaon, Maranao, T'boli, Blaan, Teduray and Pangasinan are also spoken to varying degrees by respective ethnolinguistic communities within the municipality.

== Economy ==
Poverty incidence of Polomolok (%)

Source: Philippine Statistics Authority

The Municipality of Polomolok implemented a Revenue Generation Program to increase local revenues through the collection of real property taxes and other fees and charges, update the Municipal Tax Ordinance, conduct business tax mapping, and automate systems. The municipality ranks second among municipalities and cities in Mindanao with a low poverty incidence.

=== Income classification ===
As of 2019, Polomolok has a total assets of PhP 1,773,573,000 and a total revenue of PhP 577,267,000 as certified by the Commission on Audit. It is a 1st class municipality.

Polomolok is considered as the wealthiest and richest municipality in South Cotabato and the second richest municipality in Mindanao. Also, the town is the 2nd Most Competitive Municipality in Mindanao for the year 2020.

== Agriculture ==
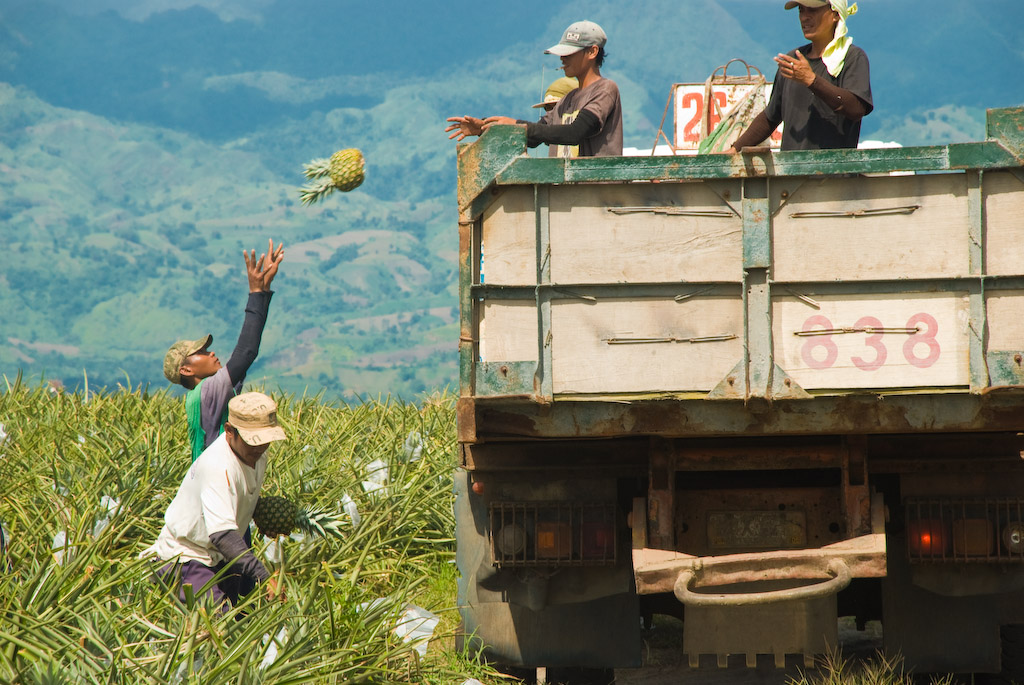
Pineapple harvesting near Dole Station 3 at barangay Palkan

Agriculture in the area consists of the growing pineapple products and processing, livestock resources (cattle, swine production, meat packaging), asparagus and cut flowers, cotton ginnery, corn, vegetable and fruits.

Dole Philippines Incorporated is the largest industrial firm involved in growing, processing and exporting of fresh and canned pineapple. As of 2004, the area planted to pineapple is 15,507.872 hectares with an average production volume of 31.94 metric tons per hectare. This industry, which is situated at Barangay Cannery Site, generates about 6,000 jobs at present. It is considered as the biggest taxpayer in the municipality.

Corn is the second most grown crop in the municipality. Data from the Agriculture Office revealed that for the year 2003 there are 3,931 hectares or 13.46% of the total cultivated land agricultural lands were devoted to corn. About 1,236 hectares of which are planted to traditional corn seeds at average production of 3.20 MT/hectare and 2,695 hectares are planted to hybrid corn at average production of 4.0 MT/ hectare. The major producers are Barangay Klinan 6, Glamang, Landan, Silway 8 and Upper Klinan. About 30% of populace adopt corn as their staple food.

Rice is also one of the major crops. 99% of the total population has rice as their staple food. Office of the Agriculturist reported that for the year 2006, 445 hectares were utilized for rice production, of which only 300 hectares are irrigated, 45 are lowland, and 100 are upland. Irrigated areas are planted 2.5 time a year while rainfed and upland are planted only once. "Gintoang Masaganang Ani Program" Program targets for the average production of rice at about 4.5 MT, for irrigated, 3 MT for lowland and 1.5 MT for upland. This target was met by the farmers this year because of rice diseases and pest infestation.

The record of the Department of Agriculture shows that as of 2006, the total area planted with asparagus is 1,435.52 hectares. Plantations of this crop are in Barangay Sulit, Sumbakil, Crossing Palkan, Bentung, Lapu, Pagalungan, Lumakil, Rubber and Magsaysay. Farmer growers have access to the export market due to contract agreement with Marsman-Drysdale Agri-Ventures and Tropifresh. The surplus are sold in the local market and diversifically used as supplements for cattle fattening.

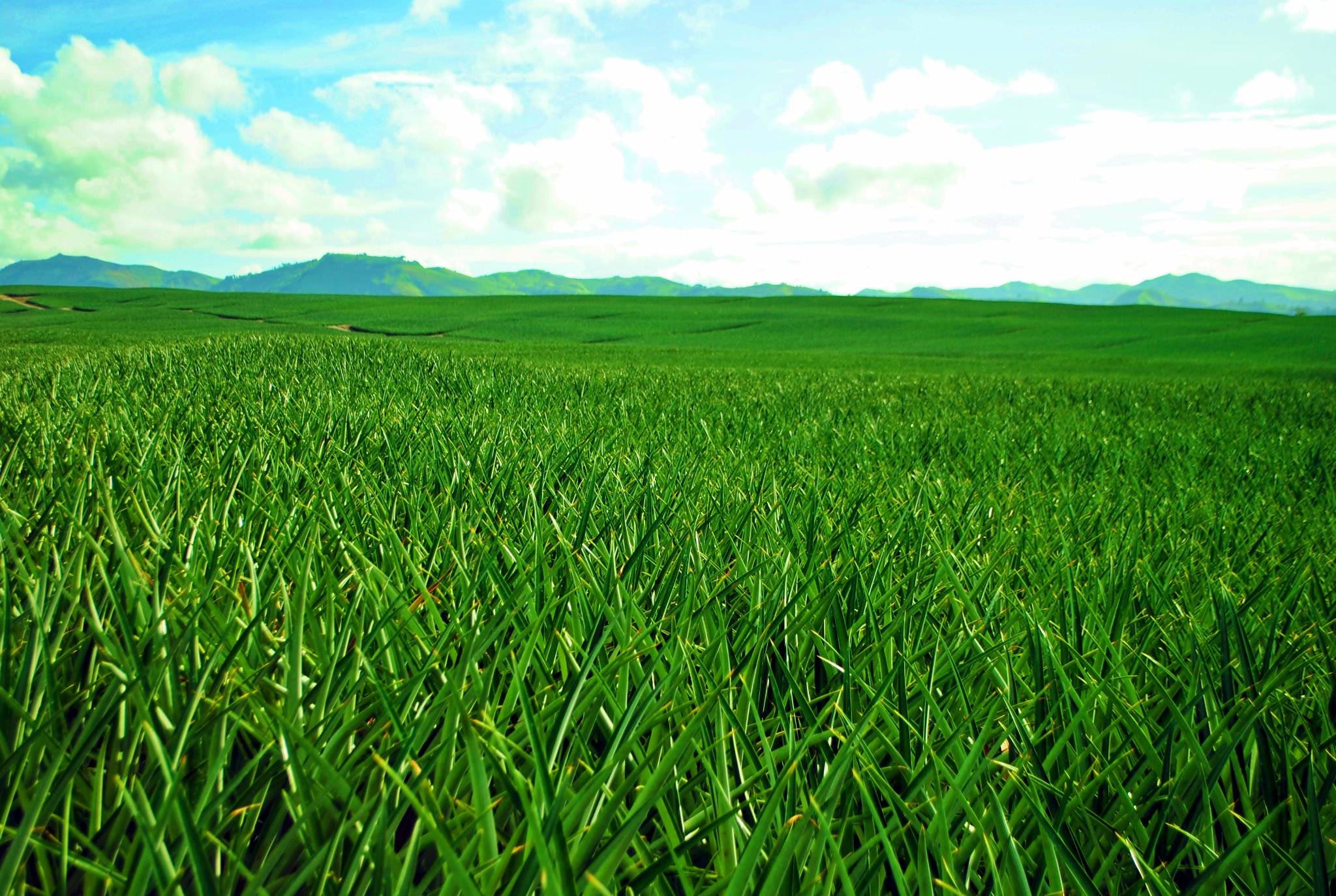
Pineapple fields at Polomolok

Vegetables grow well in Barangay Palkan, Kinilis, Maligo, Sumbakil and Koronadal Proper where the climate is cool and the soil is fertile. However, the farmers cannot really produce in large volume due to financial constraints and unstable prevailing market prices of vegetables.

Livestock and poultry production has increased tremendously in the past years. This is partly due to the municipality's climate and terrain which is ideal for livestock and poultry production. The land area devoted for agri-livestock production is 80 hectares or 0.27 percent of the total agricultural land.

For the year 2006, the Office of the Municipal Agriculturist reported that there are 322,628 heads of livestocks and poultry raised in the municipality. Poultry has the most number of heads at 271,420 where 3,639 are layers, 17,852 are backyard, and 249,929 are commercial under contract growers scheme with different Agri-business firms such as RFM, Vitarich, and Swift followed by swine with 23,719 heads which 10,970 are backyard and a total of 15,113 are raised commercially, and cattle with 24,491 heads where 2,065 are backyard and a total of 22,426 heads fattened in the cattle farms of Montery and DEALCO.

Supply of livestock in the municipality is insufficient due to shipment of livestock which are raised commercially to other parts of the country leaving the backyard raisers to support the local market. The municipality still depend on supplies coming from other areas in the province.

Wild civet coffee production improves the livelihood of the Blaan people who live at the foot of Mount Matutum Protected Landscape. The tribe scours, for half a century its forest slopes to collect the nocturnal revered Paradoxurus, "Philippine palm civet"'s defecated poops. The people's conservation promotes their livelihood from the prized wild civet coffee, called "balos" where a cup costs $80 in United States markets. Sitio 8 village, Barangay Kinilis, Polomolok is famous as a civet coffee-producing settlement.

== Healthcare ==
=== Level 2 Hospital ===
- Howard Hubbard Memorial Hospital (HHMH)

=== Level 1 Hospitals ===
- Polomolok General Hospital (PGH)
- Heramil Hospital
- Bontuyan Medical Hospital (BMHI)

=== Infirmary ===
- Polomolok Municipal Hospital (PMH)

Note: Polomolok General Hospital (PGH) is managed by the Municipal Government of Polomolok and is not related in any way to Polomolok Municipal Hospital (PMH) which is owned and managed by the Provincial Government of South Cotabato.

== Media ==
Polomolok is now the emerging broadcast hub for South Cotabato with radio stations established in the town, reaching as far as Sarangani Province. Among those are the following:

1. 93.5 Parekoy Radio
2. 99.5 Bondingan FM Polomolok (Polomolok's first radio station)

== Education ==
Institutions with High School and Senior High School

- Dole Philippines School
- Polomolok National High School
- Poblacion Polomolok National High School
- San Lorenzo Ruiz Academy

Institutions with Vocational and College Programs

- Notre Dame — Siena College of Polomolok
- General Santos Academy
- B.E.S.T. College of Polomolok
- Schola De San Jose
- Philippine Millennium Colleges
- St. Therese Blue Collar Institute
- Notre Dame of Dadiangas University - Glamang Campus
