= 2017 Visayas and Mindanao floods =

Low-pressure area floods in the Philippines

- Date: January 16 – February 10, 2017
- Location: Eastern Visayas and Northern Mindanao, Philippines
- Deaths: 9
- Property damage: 1,300 houses

The 2017 Visayas and Mindanao floods was an event that caused extreme flooding within parts of the Philippines, caused by several low-pressure systems. In mid-January 2017, several parts of Visayas and Mindanao experienced flooding as a result of a low-pressure area, combined with the tail-end of a cold front.

== Causes ==
The cause of the floods was during the impact of three depressions monitored by PAGASA (Auring, Bising, and Crising).

== Impact ==
The city of Cagayan de Oro was seriously affected by the floods, as the heavy rain started in the early afternoon and continued late into the evening on Monday, January 16, inundating several streets and stranding many commuters. Hundreds of students were trapped at the University of Science and Technology of Southern Philippines (USTP) due to the floodwaters without any food or water. With most of the campus flooded, students were forced to head to the upper floors of the school's buildings.

Shopping malls along Claro M. Recto Avenue were hit by the floodwaters as well; Limketkai Center was rendered completely impassable. One mall's basement parking area was filled with water, while another mall near Bitan-ag Creek was also flooded, despite the area already being elevated.

As a result of the heavy rain in Cagayan de Oro, parts of Camaman-an, Patag, Carmen, and a number of urban barangays were swamped by the deluge. Two landslides were reported in the city; one on Masterson Avenue near Pryce Plaza Hotel, and one in Paglaum Village, Camaman-an. The City Disaster Risk Reduction and Management Department (CDRRMD) said that a rain gauge near the Cagayan River recorded a total of 166.2 mm, about 20 mm less than the amount of rainfall recorded in December 2011 when Tropical Storm Sendong (Washi) impacted the city. However, the two-day rainfall amount was higher than that from both Tropical Depression Agaton (Lingling) and Tropical Storm Seniang (Jangmi).

Numerous business establishments and schools opened their doors to people unable to return home because of the floods. This included Centrio Mall, SM City Cagayan de Oro, and Limketkai Mall which remained open after hours, and Xavier University, which made its canteen, a number of classrooms, and covered courts as a temporary refuge.

Floods also affected the provinces of Bohol, Cebu, Negros Oriental, Misamis Oriental, Lanao del Sur, and Bukidnon. Landslides were also reported in several parts of Visayas and Mindanao.

Classes were suspended in Tacloban, Leyte, Southern Leyte, and Misamis Oriental, as well as parts of Samar, Northern Samar, Eastern Samar provinces.

== Aftermath ==
The local government of Cagayan de Oro declared a state of calamity over the city in the early morning of Tuesday, January 17, 2017. On Thursday, January 19, as a result of the continuous rainfall, the Cagayan de Oro City Disaster Risk Reduction and Management Office (CDRRMO) declared a code yellow, asking residents to be vigilant. At least seven people died in the city due to the floods.

A few days after the floods, it was reported that supplies of doxycycline, used to treat people against leptospirosis, had run out in Cagayan de Oro. A similar situation occurred in the aftermath of Tropical Storm Sendong when 24 people died because of an outbreak of leptospirosis.

According to Department of Public Works and Highways (DPWH) secretary Mark Villar, the agency will ask the Department of Budget and Management (DBM) for an additional P300 million for the accelerated completion of various projects that are meant to reduce future flooding in Cagayan de Oro. Meanwhile, the DPWH was called into question by Senate President Aquilino Pimentel III for a lack of coordination with the City Government of Cagayan de Oro when implementing projects. The agency also admitted that the recently completed bridge over Bitan-ag Creek failed to prevent neck-level floodwaters from inundating Limketkai Center and USTP. Due to garbage clogging the creek, mud, and water spilled onto Claro M. Recto Avenue.

== See also ==
- Typhoon Ketsana, or "Ondoy", a typhoon that caused widespread flooding in Metro Manila, especially in Marikina, in September 2009.
- 2012 Luzon southwest monsoon floods, floods in Luzon, especially Metro Manila, due to the southwest monsoon strengthened by Typhoon Haikui.
