= 2017 Tanay bus accident =

Road accident in Rizal, Philippines

- Location in Luzon Location in the Philippines

Details
- Date: February 20, 2017; 8:45 am (PST)
- Location: Tanay, Rizal
- Coordinates: 14°29′50″N 121°17′11″E
- Country: Philippines
- Operator: Panda Coach Tours and Transport Inc.
- Cause: Brakes failed

Statistics
- Passengers: 50
- Deaths: 15 (14 passengers + driver)
- Injured: At least 40

On February 20, 2017, a tourist bus carrying 50 passengers, mostly students on a field trip from Bestlink College of the Philippines in Quezon City, lost its brakes and crashed into an electricity pole in Tanay, Rizal, killing 15 passengers including the driver.

The accident uncovered lax regulations on safety of students on educational trips in the Philippines and prompted the Commission on Higher Education and Department of Education to issue moratoriums on field trips for the 2016–17 school year. After the moratorium, stricter guidelines on off-campus activities were imposed.

== Accident ==
A tourist bus operated by Panda Coach Tours and Transport Inc. was transporting 50 college students from Bestlink College of the Philippines to a camping site in a resort in Rizal as part of their National Service Training Program. According to Erwin Gascon of the Tanay police station, the bus was travelling to Sitio Bayucan in Barangay Sampaloc in Tanay, Rizal when it lost its brakes and hit an electricity pole around 8:45 am, killing 15 passengers (13 students and a teacher) and the driver, Julian Lacorda Jr. in the process, and injuring about 40 others. One passenger later died in a hospital a day after the accident. The town government said that the bus driver deliberately hit the post as the braking method, causing a large portion of the bus to tear off and the pole to topple onto the bus. Moments before the accident, passengers allegedly noticed the smell of burning rubber. However, the bus driver apparently ignored them.

In an interview with DZMM-AM, the bus representative, Johna Martires, said the company had already issued their insurance firm to take care of the needs of the victims.

== Reactions ==
Senators Tito Sotto and Bam Aquino sought a Senate investigation into accidents, finding to ensure the safety of the commuters amid road accidents.

== Aftermath ==
=== Moratorium on field trips ===
A day after the accident, the Commission on Higher Education imposed a moratorium on field trips and educational tours in all education levels to give the investigation of the accident. A proposal made by Commissioner Prospero de Vera III to disable field trips in private and public colleges and universities until the investigation is made. The Land Transportation Franchising and Regulatory Board (LTFRB) is set to suspend the operations of the bus company which is involved in an accident. The Department of Education (DepEd) announced on February 22 that it will issue a moratorium on all levels until June 2017 following the accident. It is revealed that another survivor said that the bus no. 8 was a substitute of Harana Tours bus that was initially assigned to them.

On August 1, 2017, the Department of Tourism (DOT) called on academic institutions to arrange field trips only with DOT-accredited tour service providers. On August 10, CHED lifted its moratorium.

On December 27, 2017, DepEd lifted its own moratorium on field trips.

=== Field trip reforms ===
New guidelines on off-campus activities which includes field trips, and participation in conferences, sports competitions would be issued by both DepEd (which covers basic education students) and CHED (which covers collegiate students).

CHED's guidelines issued in August 2017, would require insurance, medical clearance for participants and safety certifications for vehicles to be used for such activities.

DepEd Order No. 66 which lifted the moratorium on field trips and educational tours also covered new guidelines on the conduct of such matters. Part of the new regulations is requiring educational institutions to secure travel insurance for any off-campus activities.
