= Farm gate value =

The farm gate value of a cultivated product in agriculture and aquaculture is the market value of a product minus its selling costs (transport costs, marketing costs).

The market value is not the same as the price farmers get for their product, as (if an auction is used), the value they obtain per weight may be well below the market price, and in some cases, even be below a breakeven price.

When selling by auction, the price paid to a farmer for their product is typically lower than the price they are paid if they sell directly to the consumer, as they are able to set this price themselves.

The farm gate value is also lower than the retail price consumers pay in a store, as it does not include the additional costs the store incurs (shipping, handling, storage, marketing) or the profit margin sought by each company.

The UK government noted in 2018 that "information on farm gate prices is freely available", whereas there is less transparency about pricing at subsequent stages in the product's processing and supply. This discrepancy is seen as weakening the negotiating position of farmers and smaller suppliers within the supply chain.
