= 2017 Quiapo bombings =

Series of bombings in Manila, Philippines

- Quiapo (Philippines)
- Native name: 2017 Manila bombings
- Location: Quiapo, Manila, Philippines
- Date: April 28 and May 6, 2017; First explosion: 28 April, 10:58:17; Second and largest explosion: 6 May, 17:54:28 (Note: Based on CCTV camera); Third explosion: 6 May, 20:47:51 (Note: Another angle of CCTV camera shows that the time of explosion is 20:43) (PST)
- Target: Civilians
- Attack type: Bombing
- Weapon: Pipe bomb
- Deaths: 2
- Injuries: 20

The 2017 Quiapo bombings were a series of blasts which took place in late April and early May 2017 in the Manila district of Quiapo in the Philippines. The first bombing occurred along Quezon Boulevard at around 10:58 pm PST on April 28, 2017. At least 14 people were injured in the explosion which occurred amid the ongoing gathering of Southeast Asian leaders in the 30th ASEAN Summit in Manila.

On May 6, 2017, just one week since the first blast, twin bombings took place about two and a half hours apart in the same district. The first explosion occurred at around 5:40 pm PST on Gunao Street near the office of Imamate Islamic Center which instantly killed two people and injured at least four others. The second blast happened around 8:30 pm PST on Norzagaray and Elizondo Streets which injured two police officers.

== April 28 bombing ==
Philippine National Police (PNP) National Capital Region Director Oscar Albayalde confirmed the explosion which was caused by a pipe bomb made with powder used in pyrotechnics, but ruled out terror as a motive behind the incident. Albayalde said it had nothing to do with any terror groups or the ASEAN Summit and that an initial and ongoing investigation by the Manila Police District suggests a connection to a local gang war.

On April 29, 2017, the PNP said that revenge was the motive of the attack. The police said that the suspect was a father exacting revenge on three individuals who mauled his child, a minor, on April 26, 2017. The minor was blamed for theft, after a thief was caught in the area on that day.

=== Alleged ISIS involvement ===
The militant group, the Islamic State of Iraq and Syria (ISIS) reportedly claimed responsibility to the bombing through its Amaq News Agency. The local police has denied ISIS' links to the attacks saying there are no sufficient evidence to their involvement and is using the incident to advance its own causes. The police says their findings from witness testimonies and physical evidences they have gathered in the scene of the crime suggests that the bombing had no involvement of any "terrorist or threat" groups. The Armed Forces of the Philippines, echoed the police's stance and dismissed ISIS' claims as "pure propaganda" describing the incident as an isolated case and had nothing to do with the then ongoing ASEAN summit.

== May 6 twin bombings ==
PNP NCR Director Oscar Albayalde said the first explosion originated from a package delivered to the office of Atty. Nasser Abinal, president of the Imamate Islamic Center in Quiapo. Before that, at 17:53:05, a motorcycle driver arrived at the scene carrying the bomb disguised as the package. That package was for Abinal. The bomb went off as Abinal's aide, Muhammad Baniga, received the package. Two people were killed in resulting explosion, including the motorcycle driver and Muhammad Baniga.

The second explosion took place near the site of the first explosion while police were holding a media briefing on the earlier explosion. Two police officers were injured in the explosion. The regional police ordered a lockdown on the area while a bomb-inspecting robot was deployed to ensure that a third blast would not occur.
