= Influenza A virus subtype H5N6 =

Virus classification
- (unranked): Virus
- Realm: Riboviria
- Kingdom: Orthornavirae
- Phylum: Negarnaviricota
- Class: Insthoviricetes
- Order: Articulavirales
- Family: Orthomyxoviridae
- Genus: Alphainfluenzavirus
- Species: Influenza A virus
- Serotype: Influenza A virus subtype H5N6

Virus subtype

H5N6 is a subtype of the species Influenza A virus (sometimes called bird flu virus). Infected birds shed the virus in their saliva, mucus, and feces. The virus was first detected in poultry in 2013, since then spreading among wild bird populations and poultry around the world. Humans can be infected through unprotected contact with infected birds or contaminated surfaces. The virus transmits by getting into a person's eyes, nose, mouth, and through inhalation. Human infections are rare. Since 2014, at least 94 cases have occurred in humans. 37 people have died. A spike in human cases was reported in 2021. There have been no confirmed cases of human-to-human transmission. Some infections have been identified where no direct contact with infected birds or contaminated surfaces has been known to have occurred. Only one infected woman has said that she never came into any contact with poultry.

== 2016 ==
In November and December human cases of H5N6 were reported in China. From October to December, four outbreaks were also reported in China, resulting in the culling of over 170,000 birds. In December, H5N6 avian influenza was reported in bird droppings in Hong Kong.

In December, South Korea raised its bird flu alert to highest level for the first time.

== 2017 ==
An Australian test confirmed that the August 2017 bird flu outbreak in Pampanga was of the subtype H5N6.

== 2020 ==
Coinciding with the COVID-19 pandemic, H5N6 caused the deaths of 1,840 of 2,497 birds at a poultry farm in China's Sichuan province.

25,000 birds were culled in total in a Philippines poultry outbreak. A 7-mile zone constricting poultry movement was also established.

== 2021 ==
The first reported human case outside of China was detected in Laos. A five-year-old boy from Luang Prabang Province tested positive after being exposed to poultry.

At least 16 isolated cases were reported in China between July and September 2021, including a case in a 26-year-old woman from Guilin who died. A 61-year-old woman who was infected in July has denied ever coming into contact with poultry. On 3 October, the World Health Organization said wider surveillance was urgently required to better understand the risk and the recent increase of spill over to humans.

On October 26, 2021, Thijs Kuiken, a professor of comparative pathology at Erasmus University Medical Centre in Rotterdam, said the rise in human cases could be explained by a new variant which is "a little more infectious" to people.

== 2022 ==
On January 7, 2022, a 43-year-old woman in the Guangdong province of China was hospitalised.

On January 13, 2022, five more people in the Guangxi autonomous region, the Sichuan province, and the Zhejiang province of China were reported to be infected, two of whom have died.

On March 18, 2022, a 28-year-old man from Puyang in Henan Province, was hospitalized.

On March 24, 2022, a 53-year-old woman from Zhenjiang City in Jiangsu Province, was hospitalized.

A 56-year-old male living in Deyang City (Sichuan Province) became the 13th case of 2022 when on March 31, 2022, he developed symptoms. He was hospitalized on April 4.

== 2023 ==
On August 23, the case of a 27-year-old woman from Sichuan province was reported.

On September 27, a fatal case in a 68-year-old man from Chongqing was reported. This was 6th case of H5N6 in 2023 within China.

On November 14, a 33-year-old woman from China died three weeks after testing positive (on October 22), having caught the disease in Bazhong.

On November 25, a 59-year-old woman from Sichuan province was hospitalised.

== 2024 ==
Two cases in Fujian Province were fatal: a 41-year old man (June 20), and a 52 year old woman (May 28).
