= Estelita Bantilan =

Filipino textile weaver

Bai Estelita Bantilan
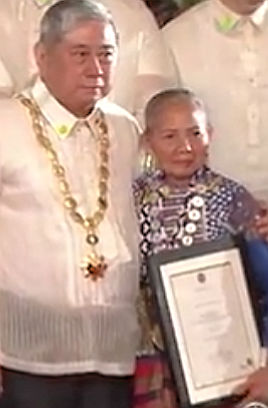
- Estelita Bantilan (right) and Virgilio Almario (left) during the 2018 conferment of GAMABA Awards
- Born: Labnai Tumndan; October 17, 1940 (age 85)
- Known for: Textile
- Style: Blaan traditional weaving
- Awards: National Living Treasure Award; 2016

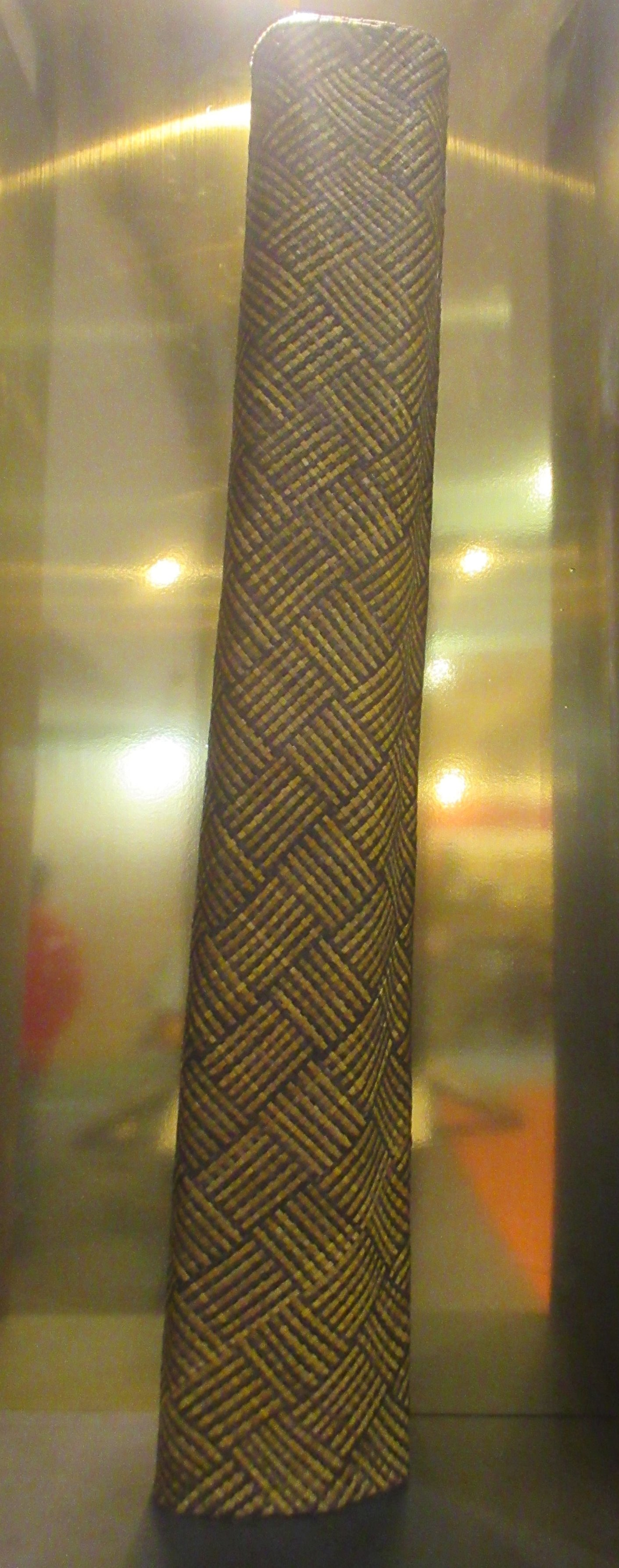
Bantilan's Igem mat

Bai Estelita Tumandan Bantilan (born Labnai Tumndan; October 17, 1940) is a Filipino textile weaver from the municipality of Malapatan, Sarangani.

== Biography ==
She is credited with creating "some of the biggest, most subtly beautiful mats to be seen anywhere in Southeast Asia." She was given the National Living Treasure Award by the Philippines through the National Commission for Culture and the Arts in 2016.

Bantilan opened a mat weaving center in Malapatan to preserve and promote the tradition of Blaan weaving.

Bantilan's famous Igem Silel - Blaan Schools of Living Traditions sleeping and placemat weaving is made of sago palm, buri palm or Romblon (Pandanus utilis) leaves colorized with natural dyes Gmelina arborea (Kumil) or turmeric ‘lageh’ Sanbangkil roots for yellow, knalum bark for black and annatto seeds for orange. She works for at least a month to finish Igem Silel, recognized as one of the most vibrant in Southeast Asia.
